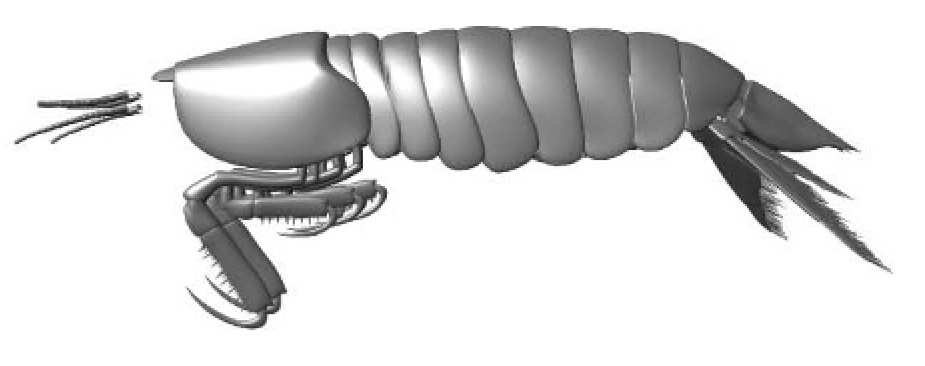
- 3D reconstruction of G. fraiponti

Scientific classification
- Kingdom: Animalia
- Phylum: Arthropoda
- Clade: Pancrustacea
- Class: Malacostraca
- Order: Stomatopoda
- Family: †Gorgonophontidae
- Genus: †Gorgonophontes; Schram, 1984

Type species
- †Gorgonophontes peleron Schram, 1984

Other species
- †G. fraiponti van Straelen, 1922

Synonyms
- Synonyms of Gorgonophontes: Anthracomysis van Straelen, 1922; Synonyms of G. fraiponti: Palaeocaris lohesti van Straelen, 1922; Perimecturus fraiponti van Straelen, 1922; Anthracomysis rostrata van Straelen, 1922; Archaeocaris fraiponti Brooks, 1962; Tyrannophontes fraiponti Schram, 1984

= Gorgonophontes =

Gorgonophontes Temporal range: Moscovian–Kasimovian

Fossil genus of mantis shrimp

Gorgonophontes is an extinct genus of mantis shrimp that lived during the late Carboniferous period in what is now the United States and Belgium. It contains two named species. The type species, G. peleron, was described in 1984 by Frederick Schram based on 100 specimens found in Nebraska and Iowa. A second species, G. fraiponti, was first named from multiple specimens found near Liège in 1922 and later reassigned to the genus.

A small crustacean with a total length of around 5 cm (2.0 in), this animal had a subrectangular carapace, a telson that narrows into a spike at the end, and four pairs of maxillipeds enlarged into raptorial appendages, the frontmost pair being larger than the others. It has been suggested to be a benthopelagic predator, using these appendages to capture prey, possibly from above, while swimming over the seabed.

== Discovery and naming ==
The first fossils of Gorgonophontes to be discovered were found decades before the genus was named. In 1922, Victor van Straelen described nine fossil specimens made up mostly of pyritized material on black shale, which were collected from lower Westphalian-aged deposits near Liège, Belgium. He believed they represented three new species, which he named Perimecturus fraiponti, Palaeocaris lohesti and Anthracomysis rostrata respectively. These specimens were sent to the collection of the University of Liège paleontology museum, where they remain today. Although van Straelen drew figures of the fossils he assigned to each species, these figures do not adequately reflect the anatomical features seen in the actual specimens. Later, all the specimens initially studied by van Straelen would be discovered to actually represent only one species. Palaeocaris lohesti and Anthracomysis rostrata were therefore declared as junior synonyms of Perimecturus fraiponti. In 1962, Harold Kelly Brooks reassigned this species to Archaeocaris, renaming it as Archaeocaris fraiponti.

The genus Gorgonophontes was first named in 1984 by Frederick Schram, who initially established it as a monotypic genus containing only the type species, G. peleron. He reported that 100 specimens of Gorgonophontes had been found in the upper Pennsylvanian-aged black shales of Nebraska and Iowa, occurring in the Oread, Dennis and Swope formations. The holotype specimen, SDSNH 4393, was collected from the Stark Shale member of the Dennis Formation near Papillion, Nebraska. The generic name references the Gorgons from Greek mythology, while the specific name is derived from the Greek word pelor meaning 'monster'.

In the same publication, Schram states that examination of the Perimecturus fraiponti material has found it to actually be a member of the genus Tyrannophontes, renaming it as Tyrannophontes fraiponti. However, in 2004 Lothar Schöllmann found that the species was actually more similar to Gorgonophontes than to Tyrannophontes, thus renaming it again as Gorgonophontes fraiponti. Later, Schram publishes a paper in 2007 reexamining Paleozoic stomatopods in which he independently reached the same conclusion that Gorgonophontes is the proper genus for this species.

== Description ==
Gorgonophontes was a crustacean of moderate size, measuring approximately 5 cm (2.0 in) in total length. Antennae were present on the head, though these are poorly preserved, with only the scaphocerite (the large exopod of the antenna) well-preserved in the fossils of G. peleron. The carapace had a subrectangular shape, with short "wings" extending posteriorly on its sides. The last three thorax segments are not covered by the carapace and instead left exposed.

The maxillipeds on the second to fifth thorax segments are enlarged and raptorial, with the pair on the second segment being most enlarged (about 1.34 times larger than the other pairs) while those on the third to fifth segments are equal in size. In G. peleron, the propodi (penultimate segment) of these maxillipeds each have two rows of spines running adjacent to each other; one row is made up of closely spaced, small spines, while the other is composed of articulated large spines spaced further apart. The narrow dactylus (final segment of the appendage) is believed to have rested between these two rows when retracted. Contrastingly, the maxillipedal propodi of G. fraiponti only have one row of spines, alternating between small spines and occasional large spines, as well as longitudinal keels.

The segments of the abdomen each have a slight ridge and furrow on their margins, and extend forward. A pair of small longitudinal keels are see. on the sixth pleon segment. Similar ridges are also seen on the telson, as well as a median keel on its proximal half. The telson is subtriangular in shape, narrowing into a spike at the end. The protopod (basal segment) of the uropod is rectangular and has two movable spines on its posterior margin, one of which is slightly curved and two to three times longer than the other. The endopod of the uropod narrows towards the end and is only half the length of the exopod.

== Classification ==
In his 1984 publication naming Gorgonophontes, Frederick Schram assigned the genus to the family Tyrannophontidae, which at the time was the only established family of Paleozoic mantis shrimps other than Perimecturidae. However, in 2007 Schram revised the relations between early stomatopods and established the family Gorgonophontidae, to which Gorgonophontes was reassigned. Gorgonophontidae was erected as a monotypic family, with Gorgonophontes as its only included genus. Later in 2009, Chabardella would be described and placed into this family as its second genus.

Smith et al. (2023) conducted a phylogenetic analysis to determine the relations between fossil mantis shrimps, which recovered Gorgonophontes to be a monophyletic genus, forming a sister taxon to the clade including Daidal schoellmanni and Daidal acanthcercus. Meanwhile, the family Gorgonophontidae was found to be polyphyletic. The authors suggest that such a result may be due to the fragmentary nature of Daidal pattoni. The results of the analysis are displayed in the cladogram below:

- Stomatopoda
  - †Archaeocaris
    - Archaeocaris vermiformis
    - Archaeocaris graffhami
  - - - †Bairdops elegans
      - †Perimecturus
        - Perimecturus parki
        - Perimecturus rapax
    - †Bairdops beargulchensis
    - - †Daidal pattoni
      - - - - †Daidal schoellmanni
            - †Daidal acanthocercus
          - †Gorgonophontes
            - Gorgonophontes fraiponti
            - Gorgonophontes peleron
        - - †Chabardella spinosa
        - - †Tyrannophontes theridion
          - - †Tyrannophontes gigantion
            - Unipeltata
              - †Triassosculda ahyongi
              - - †Tyrannosculda laurae
                - - †Pseudosculda laevis
                  - - †Archaeosculda phoenicia
                    - - - †Sculda pennata
                        - †Sculda syriaca
                      - - †Ursquilla yehoachi
                        - - †Lysiosquilla nkporoensis
                          - - †Nodosculda fisherorum
                            - Squilla mantis

== Palaeobiology ==
Gorgonophontes would have been a carnivore, based on its enlarged raptorial appendages and the diets of other mantis shrimps. It has been theorized to be a benthopelagic predator, swimming a little above the seabed while it hunted by grabbing its prey from above with its raptorial maxillipeds. This is supported by the fact that its walking appendages were too short to facilitate a wide stance, and that the animal was unable to lift the front of its body, making it incapable of catching prey while standing on the bottom. Similar conditions are seen in Tyrannophontes and Tyrannosculda, suggesting early mantis shrimps were not benthic animals like their modern counterparts. However, the larvae of modern mantis shrimps are also benthopelagic predators, and it has thus been proclaimed that studying them could allow better understanding of early mantis shrimps.
