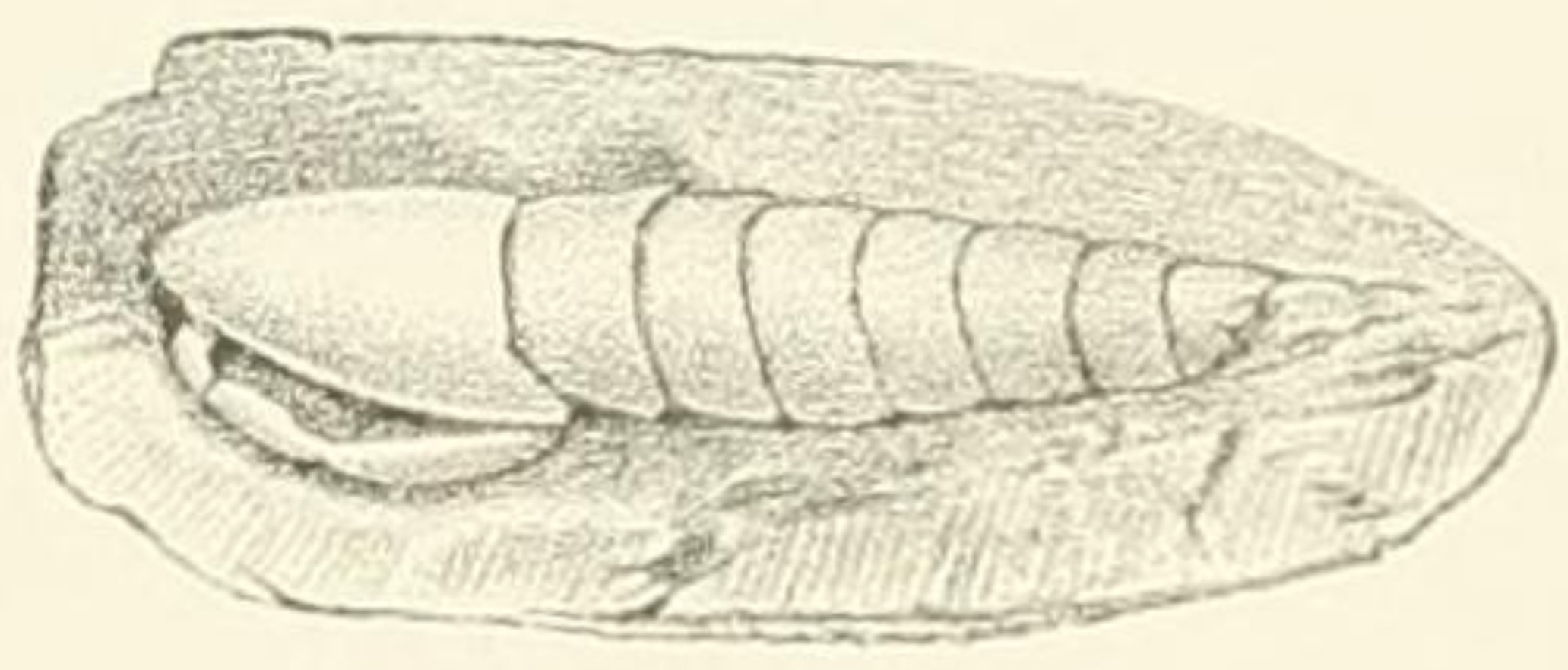
- Illustration of an A. vermiformis fossil

Scientific classification
- Kingdom: Animalia
- Phylum: Arthropoda
- Class: Malacostraca
- Order: Stomatopoda
- Suborder: †Palaeostomatopodea
- Family: †Archaeocarididae; Schram, 2008
- Genus: †Archaeocaris; Meek, 1872

Type species
- †Archaeocaris vermiformis Meek, 1872

Other species
- †A. graffhami Brooks, 1962

Synonyms
- Synonyms of A. vermiformis: Crangopsis vermiformis Ortmann, 1897

= Archaeocaris =

Archaeocaris Temporal range: Early Carboniferous (early Tournaisian to late Viséan), 358.9–330.9 Ma

Extinct genus of mantis shrimp

Archaeocaris (meaning "ancient shrimp") is an extinct genus of mantis shrimp that lived in North America during the Early Carboniferous period. Though it was placed as a member of the family Perimecturidae until 2008, it is currently deemed the only genus in the family Archaeocarididae, and contains two species. The type species, A. vermiformis, was described by Fielding Bradford Meek in 1872 from specimens collected at the base of the Waverly Group in Kentucky. A second species, A. graffhami, was named by Harold Kelly Brooks in 1962 based on a fossil found in the Caney Shale of Oklahoma, with additional remains later found in the Pilot Shale of Nevada.

Members of this genus were small animals, with A. vermiformis reaching a length of 16–25 mm (0.63–0.98 in) and the largest known A. graffhami growing 41 mm (1.6 in) long. A carapace covers the head and part of the thorax, extending further back at the sides than on the top. The abdomen is made up of six segments and a circular or ovular cross section. The telson is ovoid, with broad uropods at its sides. A. vermiformis has proportionally larger mandibles than A. graffhami, and furrowed abdominal sclerites as opposed to the smooth sclerites of the latter species. Like other mantis shrimps, Archaeocaris was a carnivore with raptorial thoracic appendages. These are lined with conical spikes on the penultimate segment and would have been used to grasp prey.

== History of discovery ==
Archaeocaris was named in 1872 by American paleontologist Fielding Bradford Meek, with A. vermiformis as the type and only known species at the time. The generic name combines the Greek words ἀρχαῖος (archaīos, meaning "ancient") and καρίς (karís, meaning "shrimp"), in reference to its ancient age. Meek studied several specimens of the animal preserved in gray phosphatic concretions found at the base of the Waverly Group near Danville, Kentucky, which include the holotype and seven paratypes. These fossils are deposited in the collection of the US National Museum. Meek believed these remains were too imperfectly preserved to determine the animal's classification, though a possible relationship with the modern Cumacea is proposed. In 1897, Prussian-born American zoologist Arnold Edward Ortmann analysed an additional 27 fossils representing 18 individuals, which he determined to belong to the same species named by Meek. These specimens, kept in the collections of Princeton University, were found in Boyle County, Kentucky, at or near the same locality where Meek's specimens originate. Ortmann concluded that A. vermiformis was so similar to known fossils of Crangopsis that it should not be placed in a separate genus, and thus renamed the species as Crangopsis vermiformis, rendering Archaeocaris a junior synonym of Crangopsis.

Further analysis by American paleontologist Harold Kelly Brooks in 1962 found that the aforementioned fossils show clear features of mantis shrimps, and that the species represented by these remains is unrelated to Crangopsis, thus the genus Archaeocaris was revalidated. In addition to the type species, Brooks described a second species of Archaeocaris which he named A. graffhami, based on a single specimen collected from the Caney Shale in Pontotoc County, Oklahoma. The specific name honors Allen Graffham, who found this specimen. While this species was initially known from only one specimen, additional fossils of A. graffhami would later be found in the upper Pilot Shale on Bactrian Mountain of the Pahranagat Range, Nevada, and described in 1979 by American paleontologist Frederick Schram.

Furthermore, Brooks reclassified Perimecturus fraiponti (described by Belgian paleontologist Victor van Straelen in 1932) as a species of Archaeocaris in his 1962 publication. However, this species was reassigned again to Tyrannophontes in 1984 and Gorgonophontes in 2004 (which it is currently placed in), leaving only A. vermiformis and A. graffhami as valid species of Archaeocaris.

== Description ==
A small crustacean, specimens of Archaeocaris vermiformis range from 16–25 mm (0.63–0.98 in) in length (not counting the rostrum or telson), with half of the known individuals measuring 24–25 mm (0.94–0.98 in) long. A. graffhami is the larger of the two species, with the biggest specimen measuring about 41 mm (1.6 in) long.

The cephalothorax makes up a third of the body length. The carapace is smooth, covering the head and part of the thorax. It is fused to the frontmost thoracic segments and covers them entirely, while wing-like projections extend from the side of the carapace to the border of the thorax and abdomen. As a result, the carapace covers the sides of the last three thoracic segments while leaving the top of them exposed. The mandibles are well sclerotised, and are proportionally smaller in A. graffhami than in A. vermiformis; the largest A. graffhami specimen has mandibles measuring 1.7% the length of its body, while A. vermiformis has mandibles about 2.3% the body length. The rostrum is triangular and plate-like, with a length equal to its width at the base.

The second to fifth pairs of thoracic appendages were raptorial, allowing the animal to grasp prey. Because these appendages are clustered together in the fossils, study of their structure is difficult. They fold into a Z-shape, with the ischium pointing forwards while the segment after it points backwards, and the dactylus (final segment) points forwards again. Conical spikes are present on the propodus (penultimate segment), opposing the sharp dactylus to form a set of grasping claws.

The abdomen has an ovular or circular cross section, and is made up of six segments. It makes up most of the animal's length and is around twice as long as the cephalothorax. The bottom margins of the sclerites (hardened plates) on each abdominal segment is straight and horizontal, aside from a small upwards curvature at the front. While the abdominal sclerites of A. vermiformis have marked furrows, those of A. graffhami are undecorated. The telson is smooth and ovoid in shape, with no indication of it narrowing into a spike like in Perimecturus, though it does become more pointed towards the end. Small protrusions known as caudal furcae are present on the telson of A. vermiformis, giving it a forked appearance. The uropods can be seen as broad, blade-like lobes.

== Classification ==
When it was first described, the classification of Archaeocaris was unclear. Relationships with modern crustaceans were initially proposed, with Meek (1872) and Ortmann (1897) suggesting the genus had affinities with Cumacea and Mysidacea respectively. However, both authors overlooked that the animal had features distinctive of mantis shrimps. These were first noticed by Brooks (1962), who recognized Archaeocaris to be an early mantis shrimp and placed it in the family Perimecturidae, believing it was a close relative of Perimecturus. Brooks assigned this family to the order Palaeostomatopoda (now delisted as a suborder and named Palaeostomatopodea). As cladistic analyses grew widespread in usage, it became clear that the palaeostomatopods are a paraphyletic grouping, as first discovered by Jenner et al. (1998). This finding was then further confirmed by Schram (2007). In addition, both studies found that Archaeocaris is an early-diverging lineage not closely related to Perimecturus. Therefore, the genus was moved to a separate family named Archaeocarididae in 2008. This family is monotypic, with Archaeocaris as its type and only genus, and is placed within Palaeostomatopodea (which is still used in a paraphyletic sense for the convenience of referring to the evolutionary grade).

Several studies including Jenner et al. (1998), Schram (2007), Haug et al. (2010) and Smith et al. (2023) have conducted phylogenetic analyses on fossil mantis shrimps, and have all recovered Archaeocaris as a monophyletic genus and the earliest-diverging lineage within the order Stomatopoda, placing it as a sister taxon to all other members of the order. The results of the analysis from Smith et al. (2023) are displayed below:

- Stomatopoda
  - †Archaeocaris
    - Archaeocaris vermiformis
    - Archaeocaris graffhami
  - - - †Bairdops elegans
      - †Perimecturus
        - Perimecturus parki
        - Perimecturus rapax
    - †Bairdops beargulchensis
    - - †Daidal pattoni
      - - - - †Daidal schoellmanni
            - †Daidal acanthocercus
          - †Gorgonophontes
            - Gorgonophontes fraiponti
            - Gorgonophontes peleron
        - - †Chabardella spinosa
        - - †Tyrannophontes theridion
          - - †Tyrannophontes gigantion
            - Unipeltata
              - †Triassosculda ahyongi
              - - †Tyrannosculda laurae
                - - †Pseudosculda laevis
                  - - †Archaeosculda phoenicia
                    - - - †Sculda pennata
                        - †Sculda syriaca
                      - - †Ursquilla yehoachi
                        - - †Lysiosquilla nkporoensis
                          - - †Nodosculda fisherorum
                            - Squilla mantis

== Palaeoenvironment ==
Unlike other known mantis shrimps of the Paleozoic (which lived in shallow marine or brackish-freshwater environments), both species of Archaeocaris are believed to have inhabited deep water in open seas. There is some overlap in the chronological ranges of the two species, but they occur in different geographic areas and thus would not have coexisted with each other.

All known remains of A. vermiformis were found in Boyle County, Kentucky and originate from deposits at the base of the Waverly Group, dating to the Tournaisian stage of the Carboniferous period (Kinderhookian stage in the North American regional series, approximately 358.9 to 348 million years ago). The deposits in which this species is found has also preserved fossils of brachiopods (such as Lingula, Productus and Spirifer), bivalves (such as Aviculopecten, Palaeoneilo and Schizodus), bryozoans (such as Fenestella), conulariids (such as Conularia) and crustaceans (such as Palaeopalaemon and Ceratiocaris). This assemblage is indicative of a benthic level community in an open marine environment.

The species A. graffhami has a wider chronological range, with the geologically oldest specimens originating from the upper Pilot Shale of Nevada and dating back to the earliest Kinderhookian (around 358.9 million years ago) of the Tournaisian stage. Remains of ostracods, sponges, and brachiopods are also known from this site. In addition, the type specimen of A. graffhami was collected from the Caney Shale in Oklahoma, a younger site which dates to the late Viséan stage (latest Meramecian or earliest Chesteran stages in the North American regional series, as recently as 330.9 million years ago), making it the youngest known record of the genus. Here, remains of the species are found alongside those of the brachiopod Linoproductus, the bivalve Caneyella, several cephalopods and numerous conodonts. In both the Pilot Shale and Caney Shale, the associated fossil assemblage is largely made up of species typically found in the bottom communities of open deep water, suggesting this was the preferred habitat of A. graffhami.
