= Ursquilla =

Ursquilla Temporal range: Campanian

Scientific classification
- Kingdom: Animalia
- Phylum: Arthropoda
- Class: Malacostraca
- Order: Stomatopoda
- Family: Squillidae
- Genus: †Ursquilla; Hof, 1998
- Species: †U. yehoachi

Binomial name
- †Ursquilla yehoachi Remy and Avnimelech, 1955

Synonyms
- Eryon yehoachi Remy and Avnimelech, 1955

Extinct genus of mantis shrimp

Ursquilla (meaning "primeval Squilla", in comparison to the related modern genus) is an extinct genus of mantis shrimp that lived in Israel and Jordan during the Campanian stage of the Late Cretaceous period. It contains a single species, Ursquilla yehoachi.

== Discovery and naming ==
The first known specimen of Ursquilla (MNHN R. 62691) was discovered in Nahal Tze'elim (formerly known as the Ouadi Seiyal Valley), Israel near a road leading from Beersheba to Mount Sodom, likely in the vicinity of Arad, and is kept in the National Museum of Natural History, France. The deposits in which it originates are part of the Campanian-aged Chert Member of the Mishash Formation, and cover the southeastern flank of the anticline of the Judaean Mountains. This specimen was first described by Jean Marcel Remy and Moché Avnimelech in 1955, who identified it as the carapace of an eryonid crustacean. They designated this fossil as the holotype of a new species which they named Eryon yehoachi. The specific name honors M. Yehoach, who collected the specimen.

In 1969, it was published in the Treatise on Invertebrate Paleontology that Martin Glaessner stated the Eryon yehoachi type specimen is not a carapace, but actually represents the telson and part of the sixth abdominal segment of a mantis shrimp. It was further stated that the specimen may belong to the extant genus Squilla, but was not complete enough for certain identification. This identification was further supported by Cees H.J. Hof, who formally redescribed the specimen in 1998 and established the genus Ursquilla, renaming the species as Ursquilla yehoachi. The generic name combines the prefix ur (meaning "primeval") with the genus Squilla, referencing its ancient age and similarity to the extant genus. Furthermore, Hof assigned three additional specimens to the species; one of which (GSI M-8113) belongs to the collection of the Geological Survey of Israel and was collected from the Chert Member of the Mishash Formation, in the northern flank of the Hazera anticline, Israel by Dr. S. Ilani in 1994. The other two specimens are preserved together in the same slab (BMNH I 7316) found in the outcrops of the Amman Formation east of Al-Karak, Jordan, presented in May 1906 and kept in the London Natural History Museum. All these fossils preserve only the tail fan of the animal. An epoxy resin cast of the type specimen is also kept in the London Natural History Museum and labelled as BMNH I 15472.

A fifth specimen was found by Stan Natkaniec in the Negev Desert, Israel during a private trip and donated to the State Museum of Natural History Stuttgart. This fossil (designated as SMNS 67703) preserves the tail fan and last three abdominal segments of the animal. It was identified as a specimen of U. yehoachi by Günter Schweigert and described in a paper published in 2013, which also reevaluated the four previously known Ursquilla specimens.

== Description ==
Known specimens of Ursquilla have preserved only the tail fan and last three segments of the abdomen. Size of the telson varies between specimens from 2.4–3.2 cm (0.94–1.26 in) in length and 2.4–3.0 cm (0.94–1.18 in) in width, with the smallest specimens proposed to represent immature individuals. Taking 2.8 cm (1.1 in) as an average telson length and assuming the animal had body proportions matching modern squilloid mantis shrimp such as Squilla mantis, it has been estimated that Ursquilla reached a total length of 17–18 cm (6.7–7.1 in).

=== Abdomen ===
Based on other mantis shrimp, the animal presumably had six abdominal segments, thus the known segments would be the fourth to sixth. The sixth abdominal segment is decorated with four pairs of keels designated as (in order of increasing distance from the center) the submedian, intermediate, lateral and marginal keels. Apart from the marginal keels, all are ornamented with a row of tubercles. The submedian keels are straight and show a gradual increase in height down the animal's length before abruptly ending at the hind margin of the segment. The intermediate keels are slightly curved and less pronounced. The lateral and marginal keels are preserved only in the sixth abdominal segment of one specimen (GSI M-8113), showing the lateral keels are straight while the marginal keels are positioned obliquely, fusing with the lateral keels at the back of the segment. The fourth and fifth abdominal segments are only preserved in one specimen (SMNS 67703) and not preserved as well as the sixth, but appear mostly similar to it in structure apart from having less pronounced ridges.

=== Telson ===
The telson is vaguely rectangular in shape, about as long as it is broad and with convex side margins. Three pairs of teeth-like protrusions are present on the margins, with the hindmost pair protruding from the back margin of the telson. The protrusions of the hindmost pair are inflated over their length, and each is decorated with four to six tubercles which decrease in size down the length of the protrusions. The other two pairs of protrusions are less pronounced and lack tubercles. Between the middle and hindmost protrusions on each side are a row of four serrations of equal size, known as intermediate denticles. Four addition serrations known as submedian denticles are present on the very back of the telson between the hindmost pair of protrusions, arranged into two pairs (one pair on either side of the telson midline). From the middle protrusions to the front of the telson, the telson margin is inflated, forming a rounded marginal keel decorated with small tubercles. Halfway between the frontmost pair of protrusions and the front margin of the telson is a crease known as the prelateral lobe (a feature seen in derived squilloid mantis shrimp).

Down the middle of the telson is a robust and rounded keel known as the median keel, which starts a few millimeters behind the front margin of the telson and ends a few millimeters in front of the submedian denticles. The median keel is flanked on either side by a straight row of tubercles. At the side of each row of tubercles is another keel called the submedian keel. This paired submedian keels have small tubercles on their surface and stretch down the length of the telson, almost lining up with hindmost pair of marginal teeth-like protrusions. The submedian keels are mostly straight but curve slightly towards the sides at the front. Another pair of keels known as the lateral keels run close to the telson margins, and are also decorated with tubercles. The lateral keels are curved, together almost forming an ovular outline, and nearly merge with the submedian keels and hindmost marginal protrusions at their end. A short ridge connects each lateral keel to the marginal keel near it, at which pint there is also a small protrusion of the lateral keel pointing towards the telson center.

=== Uropods ===
The uropods are biramous (branched into two) and preserved in two of the known Ursquilla specimens: GSI M-8113 only preserves incomplete parts of them, while SMNS 67703 preserves them better. The protopod (basal segment) has a curved keel on its outer margin, a branched median keel with small tubercles, and a short keel near the base of the protopod running parallel to the margin of the abdomen. The endopod (inner branch) has an elongated ovular shape and possibly a keel down the middle. SMNS 67703 shows that the exopod (outer branch) is composed of two parts, the proximal part being subrectangular and slightly C-shaped, articulated against the smaller and paddle-shaped distal part. However, GSI M-8113 only poorly preserved the exopod, thus Hof (1998) claims it appears to be made of only one segment. SMNS 67703 shows possibly up to 11 backward-pointing articulated spines along the outer margin of the proximal part of the exopod. The spines increase in length away from the base of the exopod, with the closest to the base measuring 2 mm (0.079 in) and the second closest to the tip measuring 7 mm (0.28 in). The closest spine to the tip of the exopod is broken off, but presumably is the longest. The paddle-like distal part of the exopod is estimated to be 12 mm (0.47 in) long and 6 mm (0.24 in) wide in SMNS 67703, but has only been preserved faintly. There is some indication of setae (bristles) along the rim of this part.

== Classification ==
In his initial description of Ursquilla, Hof (1998) established the monotypic family Ursquillidae to accommodate the genus. Recognizing the similarity of Ursquilla to the modern genus Squilla, he assigned the family to the superfamily Squilloidea. However, an analysis by Shane T. Ahyong published in 2005 found that despite its age, Ursquilla is a highly derived member of the extant family Squillidae, showing that this family had already greatly diversified by the Late Cretaceous period, and thus Ursquillidae was declared a junior synonym of Squillidae. This result was further supported by the later discovery of an additional Ursquilla specimen, revealing a prelateral lobe on the telson like that found in other squillids.

A phylogenetic analysis conducted by Smith et al. (2023) recovered Squillidae as a non-monophyletic grouping, with Nodosculda (traditionally placed in Sculdidae) being the closest relative to Squilla mantis despite the latter and Ursquilla having previously been assigned to the same family. However, it is also proposed that such an unconventional result may be due to the fact that Ursquilla, Nodosculda and Lysiosquilla nkporoensis are poorly known, and more material of squillids is needed to resolve the relationships of the group. The results of the analysis are displayed below:

- Stomatopoda
  - †Archaeocaris
    - Archaeocaris vermiformis
    - Archaeocaris graffhami
  - - - †Bairdops elegans
      - †Perimecturus
        - Perimecturus parki
        - Perimecturus rapax
    - †Bairdops beargulchensis
    - - †Daidal pattoni
      - - - - †Daidal schoellmanni
            - †Daidal acanthocercus
          - †Gorgonophontes
            - Gorgonophontes fraiponti
            - Gorgonophontes peleron
        - - †Chabardella spinosa
        - - †Tyrannophontes theridion
          - - †Tyrannophontes gigantion
            - Unipeltata
              - †Triassosculda ahyongi
              - - †Tyrannosculda laurae
                - - †Pseudosculda laevis
                  - - †Archaeosculda phoenicia
                    - - - †Sculda pennata
                        - †Sculda syriaca
                      - - †Ursquilla yehoachi
                        - - †Lysiosquilla nkporoensis
                          - - †Nodosculda fisherorum
                            - Squilla mantis

== Paleobiology ==
Cees H.J. Hof first noted in 1998 that the known specimens of Ursquilla show variation in the shape of the telson, with those of the two specimens from the Jordanian slab (BMNH I 7316) being more elongated and the keels being less inflated in comparison to the telsons of other known specimens from Israel. He suggested that this may be a preservational artifact. However, it was later pointed out by Haug et al. (2013) that since the two Jordanian specimens are preserved close together on the same slab but oriented in different directions, tectonic deformation would not cause them both to be elongated the same way. Instead, they propose that telson variation among known specimens was actually due to ontogeny, with the telson becoming relatively wider and its keels becoming more inflated as the animal grew older. This is supported by the fact that the most elongated telsons are from the smallest known specimens (the two fossils on the Jordanian slab), while the largest known specimen of Ursquilla (the holotype, MNHN R. 62691) shows the proportionally broadest telson and most inflated keels. Though the idea of the telson variation being an example of sexual dimorphism was also considered, telson ratio differences between sexes has not been reported in any extant mantis shrimp, whereas keel inflation with increasing age is known from many living species, especially within the family Squillidae (which Ursquilla is a member of).
