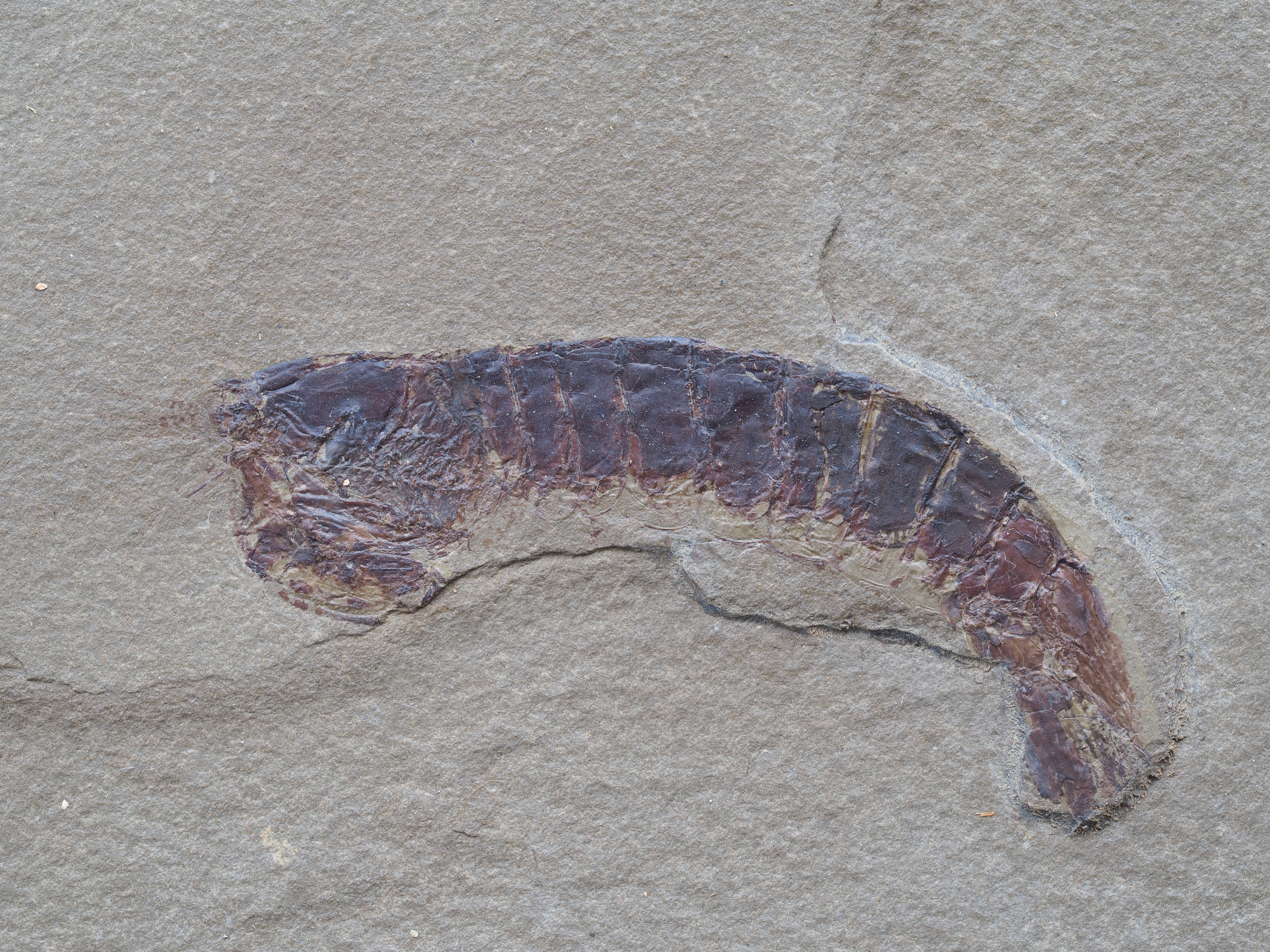
- Fossil of D. acanthocercus

Scientific classification
- Kingdom: Animalia
- Phylum: Arthropoda
- Clade: Pancrustacea
- Class: Malacostraca
- Order: Stomatopoda
- Family: †Daidalidae; Schram, 2007
- Genus: †Daidal; Schram, 2007

Type species
- †Tyrannophontes acanthocercus Jenner et al., 1998

Species
- †D. acanthocercus Jenner et al., 1998; †D. pattoni Peach, 1908; †D. schoellmanni Schram, 2007

Synonyms
- D. acanthocercus: Tyrannophontes acanthocercus Jenner et al., 1998; D. pattoni: Perimecturus pattoni Peach, 1908; Tyrannophontes pattoni Clark, 1989

= Daidal =

Daidal Temporal range: Late Mississippian–Early Pennsylvanian

Extinct genus of mantis shrimp

Daidal (named after a spirit in Takelma mythology) is an extinct genus of mantis shrimp that lived during the Carboniferous period. It is the only genus in the family Daidalidae. Three species are currently placed within the genus. Fossils of the type species, D. acanthocercus, have been found in the Bear Gulch Limestone of Montana. A second species, D. pattoni, is known from the Lower Limestone Formation of Scotland, and the third species, D. schoellmanni, was discovered in Westphalia, Germany. The genus has been proposed to be polyphyletic, with D. pattoni possibly being an earlier diverging lineage, though more specimens and research are needed to confirm this.

== Taxonomic history ==
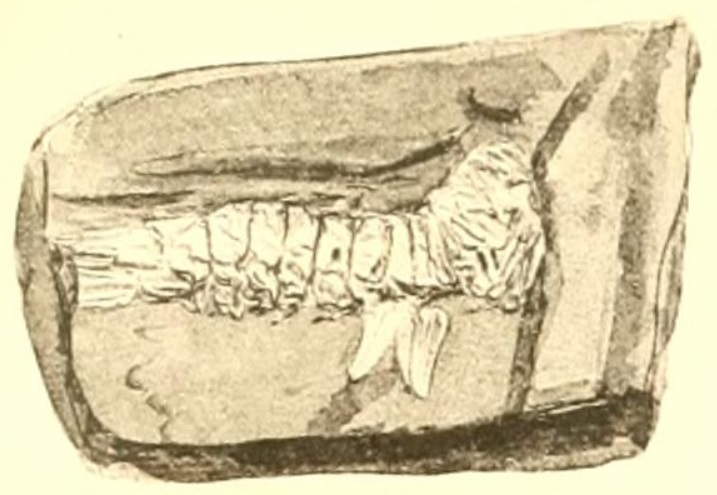
Holotype of Daidal pattoni as illustrated in 1908, originally labelled as Perimecturus pattoni

Fossilized remains of Daidal were first described almost a century before the genus was named. In 1908, Ben Peach studied several crustacean fossils from the Carboniferous deposits in Scotland, and erected the species Perimecturus pattoni based on a single specimen (G 1887.25.1059) collected from the Top Hosie Limestone of the Lower Limestone Formation near East Kilbride, believing it belonged in the genus Perimecturus. The specific name honors Andrew Patton, manager of the Calderwood Cement Works, who collected this fossil. Clark (1989) would report on additional material of this species and move it into the genus Tyrannophontes as Tyrannophontes pattoni, though Lothar Schöllman placed it back into Perimecturus in 2004.

Jenner et al. (1998) analysed numerous stomatopod specimens from the Bear Gulch Limestone. They recognized that some of these specimens, formerly thought to represent Bairdops beargulchensis or Tyrannophontes theridion, represent a new species which they named Tyrannophontes acanthocercus. The specimen CM 34453 was selected as the holotype of this species. The specific name is combined from the Greek akanthos (meaning "thorn") and kerkos (meaning "tail"), in reference to the spines on the telson.

Lothar Schöllman studied the remains of another stomatopod species collected from Hagen-Vorhalle, Westphalia, Germany, and in 2004 he concluded they were mostly similar to Gorgonophontes, assigning them to Gorgonophontes cf. fraiponti. Other authors before him had tentatively assigned the specimens to Perimecturus or Tyrannophontes.

In 2007, Frederick Schram conducted a study revising the classification of Paleozoic stomatopods. He found that the fossils assigned to Tyrannophontes acanthocercus differed significantly from the holotype of Tyrannophontes, and that the species should be placed in a separate genus. The genus Daidal was thus erected, with T. acanthocercus (now renamed Daidal acanthocercus) as the type species. The generic name references a spirit in Takelma mythology of the same name. Schram also found Perimecturus pattoni to be similar to D. acanthocercus in features of the pleon and telson, therefore reclassifying it as a second species of Daidal now named Daidal pattoni. In addition, the German remains assigned to Gorgonophontes cf. fraiponti were also discovered by Schram to be similar to specimens of Daidal, so the species Daidal schoellmanni was erected based on them. The specific name honors Lothar Schöllman for his earlier work on this species.

== Description ==
Daidal is an invertebrate of moderate size, with the type species D. acanthocercus reaching a body length of 20–80 mm (0.79–3.15 in). Each antennule has three flagellae of around equal length. The mandibles are large and heavily sclerotised, located around three fifths the length of the carapace from the posterior edge of the carapace. The carapace is only slightly longer than it is tall, enveloping the front of the thorax (apart from its underside), with a subtriangular shape in side view and subrectangular shape in top view. The top of the carapace extends towards the front margin of the fifth thorax segment, while wing-like extensions on its sides extend to the front margins of the sixth thorax segment, and a furrow stretches along the carapace margins.

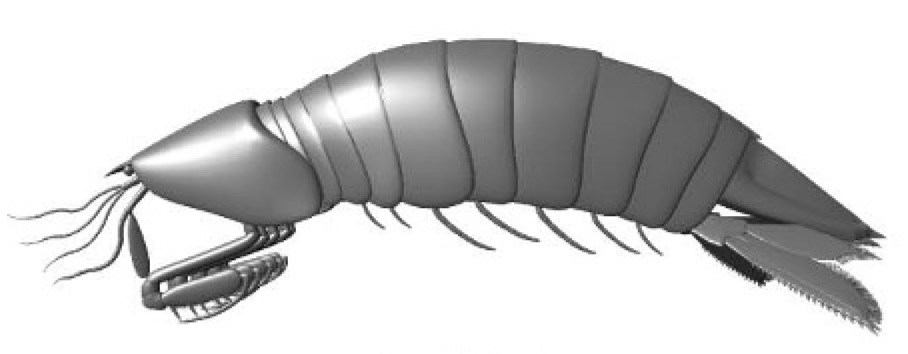
3D reconstruction of D. schoellmanni

The second to fifth thorax segments each possess a pair of maxillipeds (appendages which function as mouthparts), which are similar in shape and size. These are enlarged and served as raptorial appendages for catching prey. The propodi (penultimate segment) of the maxillipeds are large and subrectangular, with two parallel rows of spines: a row of moveable large spines on the outer side and a row of small spines on the inner side. The dactyli (final segment) of the maxillipeds are thin and blade-like, curving towards the body.

The pleon is around a third longer than the cephalothorax, with each segment being slightly larger than the one in front of it. The segments are non-overlapping and have rounded corners, with furrows and ridges on the margins. The pleopods are heavily sclerotized, with the terminal segment being greatly enlarged. In D. acanthocercus and D. schoellmanni the tergites are undecorated, whereas those of D. pattoni have rippled decoration. The segment of the uropod closest to the body has two backwards-pointing spines. Paired keels are present on the subrectangular and tapering telson, as are four movable spines on the margins of its underside.

== Classification ==
The species now assigned to Daidal have been placed in various other genera in the past, and thus have also been positioned in different families. D. acanthocercus was initially described as a species of Tyrannophontes, while D. pattoni was first named as a species of Perimecturus, and therefore were assigned to the families Tyrannophontidae and Perimecturidae respectively. The specimens of D. schoellmanni were at one point associated with the genus Gorgonophontes and by extension the family Gorgonophontidae. Frederick Schram was the first to recognize these species as members of the genus he named Daidal in 2007, and erected the family Daidalidae for this genus. The family belongs to the suborder Archaeostomatopodea and is monotypic, with Daidal being the type and only genus.

Smith et al. (2023) conducted a phylogenetic analysis to determine the relations between fossil mantis shrimps, which recovered the genus Daidal to be polyphyletic. While D. acanthocercus and D. schoellmanni were recovered as sister taxa, these two species were also recovered to be more closely related to Gorgonophontes than to the earlier-diverging D. pattoni. However, it was noted that this result may be due to a lack of data on the thoracic appendages of D. pattoni. The results of the analysis are displayed in the cladogram below:

- Stomatopoda
  - †Archaeocaris
    - Archaeocaris vermiformis
    - Archaeocaris graffhami
  - - - †Bairdops elegans
      - †Perimecturus
        - Perimecturus parki
        - Perimecturus rapax
    - †Bairdops beargulchensis
    - - †Daidal pattoni
      - - - - †Daidal schoellmanni
            - †Daidal acanthocercus
          - †Gorgonophontes
            - Gorgonophontes fraiponti
            - Gorgonophontes peleron
        - - †Chabardella spinosa
        - - †Tyrannophontes theridion
          - - †Tyrannophontes gigantion
            - Unipeltata
              - †Triassosculda ahyongi
              - - †Tyrannosculda laurae
                - - †Pseudosculda laevis
                  - - †Archaeosculda phoenicia
                    - - - †Sculda pennata
                        - †Sculda syriaca
                      - - †Ursquilla yehoachi
                        - - †Lysiosquilla nkporoensis
                          - - †Nodosculda fisherorum
                            - Squilla mantis

== Palaeobiology ==
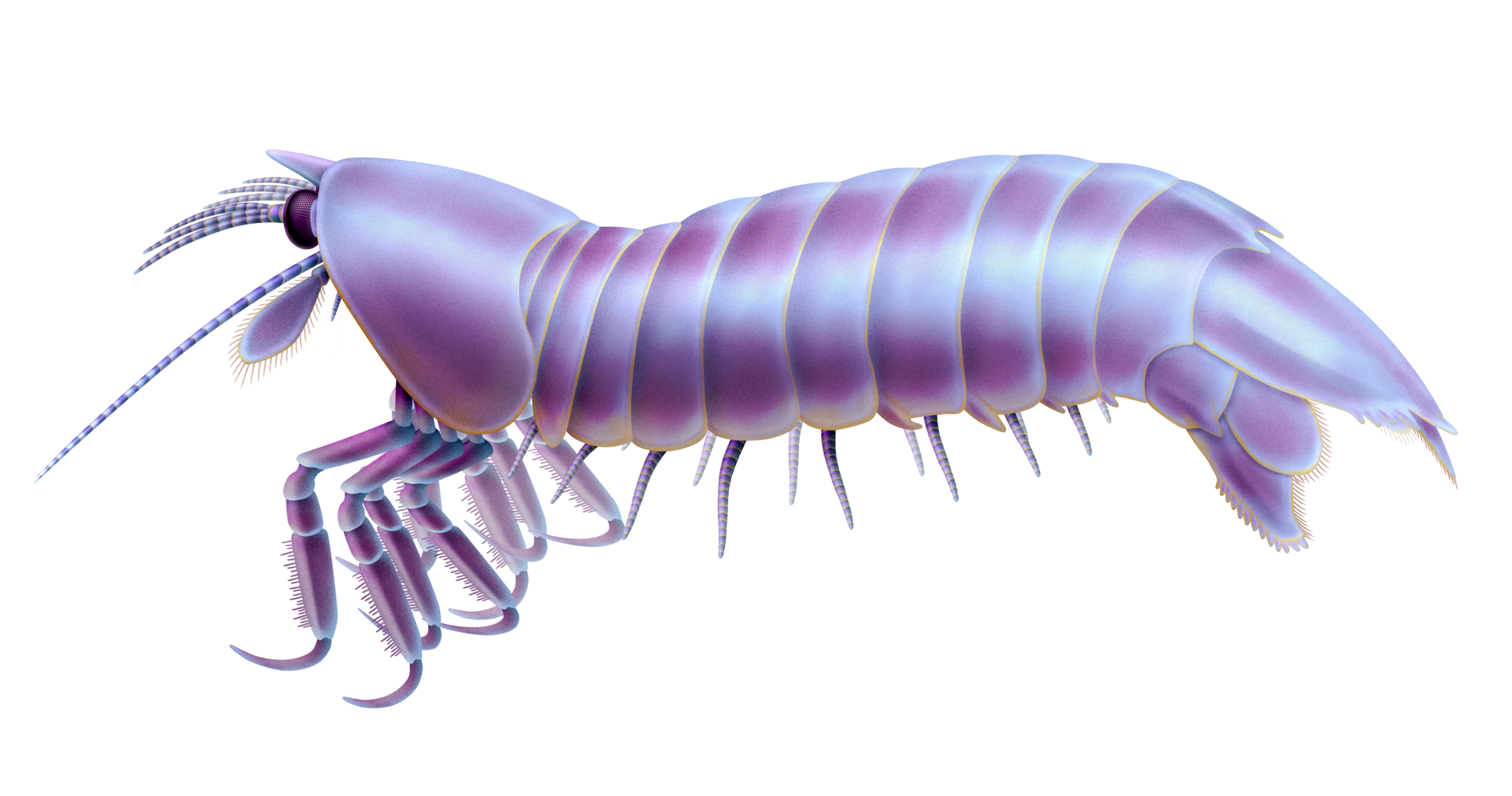
Restoration of D. acanthocercus

Based on the diet of other mantis shrimps and the fact that it has enlarged raptorial appendages, Daidal is believed to have been a carnivore. In extant unipeltatan mantis shrimps, the raptorial appendages (the second pair of thoracopods) have a specialized joint associated with a set of muscles to form a click-joint mechanism, allowing the appendages to rapidly extend and capture prey. However, Daidal probably lacked this mechanism, instead having raptorial appendages that more closely resemble the smaller, third to fifth thoracopods of unipeltatans used to manipulate prey after capture. It has thus been suggested by Jenner et al. (1998) that basal stomatopods like Daidal were opportunistic scavengers which primarily handled dead food. On the other hand, Haug & Haug (2021) theorized that early mantis shrimps were benthopelagic predators, swimming above the seabed while they hunted, possibly by grabbing their prey from above. This was supported by the appendage morphology in Tyrannosculda, Tyrannophontes and Gorgonophontes, showing these early forms could not attack prey from the seabed. This method of hunting is also observed in the larvae of extant mantis shrimps, and studying them may help increase our understanding of early stomatopod ecology.
