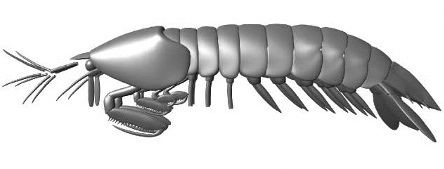
- 3D reconstruction of T. theridion

Scientific classification
- Kingdom: Animalia
- Phylum: Arthropoda
- Clade: Pancrustacea
- Class: Malacostraca
- Order: Stomatopoda
- Family: †Tyrannophontidae; Schram, 1969
- Genus: †Tyrannophontes; Schram, 1969

Type species
- †Tyrannophontes theridion Schram, 1969

Other species
- †T. gigantion Schram, 2007

= Tyrannophontes =

Tyrannophontes Temporal range: Moscovian

Extinct genus of mantis shrimp

Tyrannophontes is an extinct genus of mantis shrimp that lived during the late Carboniferous period in what is now the Mazon Creek fossil beds of Illinois. It is the only genus in the family Tyrannophontidae. The type species, T. theridion, was described in 1969 by Frederick Schram. A second, much larger species, T. gigantion, was also named by Schram in 2007. Two other species were formerly assigned to the genus, but have since been reclassified.

This animal is theorized to be a benthopelagic predator, swimming above the seabed while it hunted, perhaps grabbing prey from above using its raptorial appendages. It lived in a marine environment which would have been just south of the equator.

== Discovery and naming ==
The holotype of Tyrannophontes theridion (PE12098) was collected from the Mazon Creek fossil beds in Illinois, USA by Calvin George and donated to the Field Museum of Natural History. The genus was erected in 1969 by Frederick Schram, who at the time considered it to be monotypic and include the single species T. theridion. Aside from the holotype, a few other specimens of T. theridion have also been collected from the Mazon Creek fossil beds, though Schram noted that the species was quite rare.

An additional species, T. gigantion, was described in 2007 by Frederick Schram. It is known from only the holotype (PE 36987), which preserves the head and thorax, and was collected from the Francis Creek Shale of the Mazon Creek fossil beds in Illinois. This species is significantly larger than even the largest specimens of T. theridion, and thus was given the specific name meaning "gigantic" in Greek. As the tail fan is not preserved, this species may actually belong in a separate genus, but is prudently placed in Tyrannophontes until more specimens are found.

=== Reassigned species ===
The following species were formerly assigned to the genus Tyrannophontes, but have since been reassigned:

- T. fraiponti was initially named as Perimecturus fraiponti by Victor van Straelen in 1922 based on fossils collected near Liège, Belgium. It was renamed as a species of Tyrannophontes in 1984 by Frederick Schram, and then reassigned again to Gorgonophontes in 2004 by Lothar Schöllman.
- T. acanthocercus was named in 1998 and is known from several specimens found in the Bear Gulch Limestone of Montana, with the holotype being CM 34453. The specific name is combined from the Greek akanthos (meaning "thorn") and kerkos (meaning "tail"), in reference to the spines on the telson. In 2007, this species was moved to a separate genus, Daidal, of which it is the type species.

== Description ==
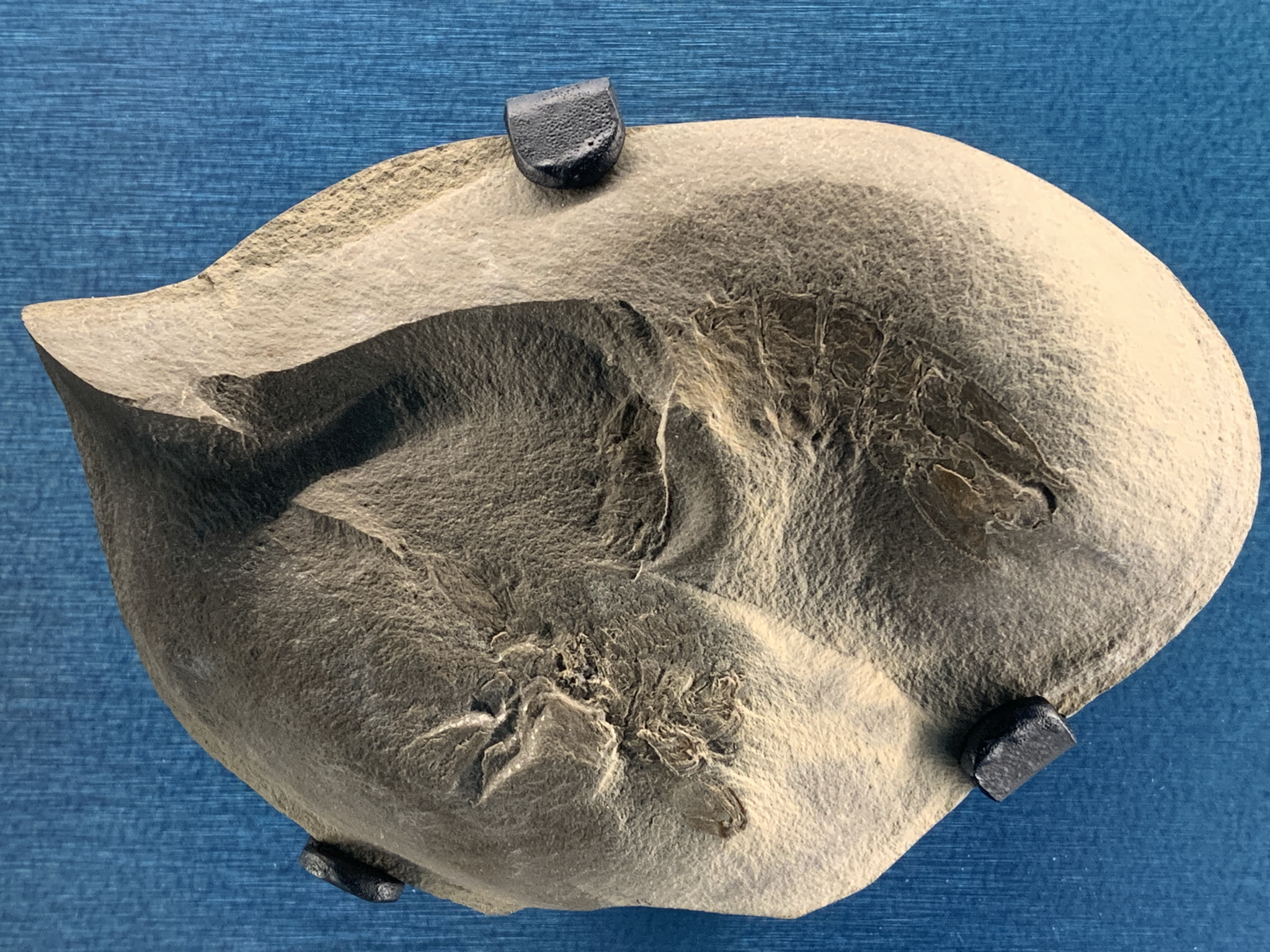
T. theridion. 325 million years old, Early Carboniferous, Heath Formation, Bear Gulch, Montana. At the Royal Tyrrell Museum of Palaeontology.

The two species of Tyrannophontes differ greatly in size. T. theridion reached a carapace length of 4.4–13.6 mm (0.17–0.54 in). Meanwhile, the only known specimen of T. gigantion has a carapace length of 27 mm (1.1 in) and the entire living animal likely measured 135 mm (5.3 in) long, comparable in size to extant Harpiosquilla species.

The antennules each possess three annulated flagella of approximately equal length. The compound eyes are large and oval in shape, attached to the head by stalks. The smooth carapace envelops the front part of the thorax on the upper and lateral sides, extending back to partly cover the seventh segment, with a subrectangular shape when viewed from above and subtriangular shape when seen from the side. Gastric ridges are present on either side of the carapace, extending from the base of the rostrum to the corners of the carapace. The rostrum is dorsoventrally flattened, appearing almost triangular when seen from the top.

The thorax can be divided into a front part made up of small, unfused segments which bear short thoracopods (walking appendages), and a back part of three larger segments. The back part of the thorax is not covered by the carapace. The entire thorax is slightly shorter than the abdomen. Each segment of the pleon is slightly longer than the one immediately in front of it, with the first segment being the shortest and the sixth being the longest. The telson is ovate and has a pair of moveable spines a bit over halfway along its length, as well as a differentset of spines nearer the base of the telson.

== Classification ==
In his initial description of Tyrannophontes, Frederick Schram also erected the family Tyrannophontidae, to which the genus is assigned. The family is monotypic, with Tyrannophontes being its type and only genus, and is placed in the suborder Archaeostomatopodea. Schram used the same classification again in 2007 in a study revising the morphology and relationships of Paleozoic holpocarids. Smith et al. (2023) conducted a phylogenetic analysis to determine the relations between fossil mantis shrimps, the results of which are displayed in the cladogram below:

- Stomatopoda
  - †Archaeocaris
    - Archaeocaris vermiformis
    - Archaeocaris graffhami
  - - - †Bairdops elegans
      - †Perimecturus
        - Perimecturus parki
        - Perimecturus rapax
    - †Bairdops beargulchensis
    - - †Daidal pattoni
      - - - - †Daidal schoellmanni
            - †Daidal acanthocercus
          - †Gorgonophontes
            - Gorgonophontes fraiponti
            - Gorgonophontes peleron
        - - †Chabardella spinosa
        - - †Tyrannophontes theridion
          - - †Tyrannophontes gigantion
            - Unipeltata
              - †Triassosculda ahyongi
              - - †Tyrannosculda laurae
                - - †Pseudosculda laevis
                  - - †Archaeosculda phoenicia
                    - - - †Sculda pennata
                        - †Sculda syriaca
                      - - †Ursquilla yehoachi
                        - - †Lysiosquilla nkporoensis
                          - - †Nodosculda fisherorum
                            - Squilla mantis

== Palaeobiology ==
Judging from its raptorial appendages and the lifestyles of other mantis shrimps, Tyrannophontes would have been a predatory animal. However, while modern mantis shrimps are primarily benthic, Tyrannophontes has been theorized to be a benthopelagic animal, swimming above the seabed while it hunted, and perhaps grabbing prey from above using its raptorial appendages. The presence of large tergites on these appendages would have prevented the animal from lifting the front of its body while standing, and its short walking appendages make a wide stance impossible. This further suggests Tyrannophontes was not a bottom-dwelling animal. In modern mantis shrimps, only the larvae hunt primarily while swimming, and it has been suggested that research into mantis shrimp larvae is needed to better understand to lifestyle of early stomatopods like Tyrannophontes.

Stomach contents suggest that Tyrannophontes was predated upon by the large coelacanth Caridosuctor.

== Palaeoenvironment ==
Both species of Tyrannophontes originate from the Mazon Creek fossil beds of Illinois, which date back to the Moscovian age of the late Carboniferous period, around 309 million years ago. At the time of deposition, this locality would have been located at a latitude between 4 and 10° south of the equator. This crustacean is part of a diverse fossil assemblage known as the Essex biota, which would have lived in a marine bay. The Mazon Creek fossil beds are an important lagerstätte preserving fossils of an extremely wide array of organisms, which would have lived alongside Tyrannophontes. These include over 25 species of fish and numerous types of invertebrates, with the Sea anemone Essexella being the most abundant animal from this location. The enigmatic Tullimonstrum, nicknamed the Tully monster, is also present and one of the most famous species from the assemblage.
