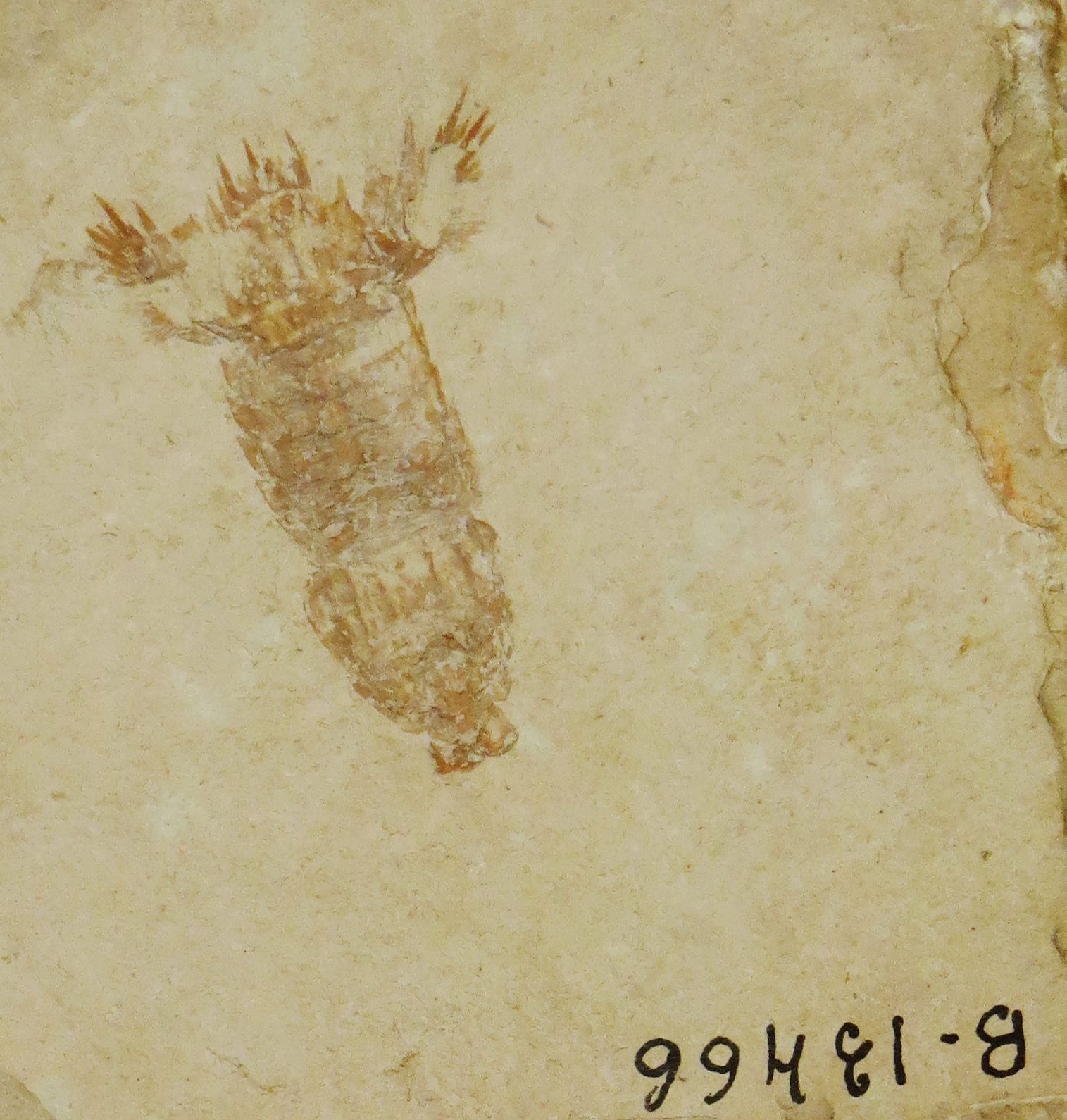
- Fossil of S. pennata

Scientific classification
- Kingdom: Animalia
- Phylum: Arthropoda
- Clade: Pancrustacea
- Class: Malacostraca
- Order: Stomatopoda
- Family: †Sculdidae
- Genus: †Sculda; Münster, 1840

Type species
- †Sculda pennata Münster, 1840

Other species
- †S. spinosa Kunth, 1870; †S. syriaca Dames, 1886

Synonyms
- Buria Giebel, 1857

= Sculda =

Sculda Temporal range: Tithonian–Cenomanian

Extinct genus of mantis shrimp

Sculda (after Skuld from Norse mythology) is an extinct genus of mantis shrimp known from the late Jurassic to late Cretaceous of Germany and Lebanon. Although several species have been assigned to it, some are now deemed dubious or moved to different genera. It was a moderate-sized crustacean, measuring no more than 50 mm (2.0 in) long. Sculda would have lived in a marine environment and been a predatory animal, likely smashing its prey with the widened segment of its raptorial appendages before cutting it with the sharp appendage tips.

The genus was first named in 1840 by Georg zu Münster, based on fossils collected from the Solnhofen Limestone of Bavaria, Germany. It was the first Mesozoic mantis shrimp to be discovered and named, though it was initially misidentified as an isopod. Sculda is generally placed in the family Sculdidae, though this family has been proposed to be polyphyletic.

== Taxonomic history ==
=== Early history ===
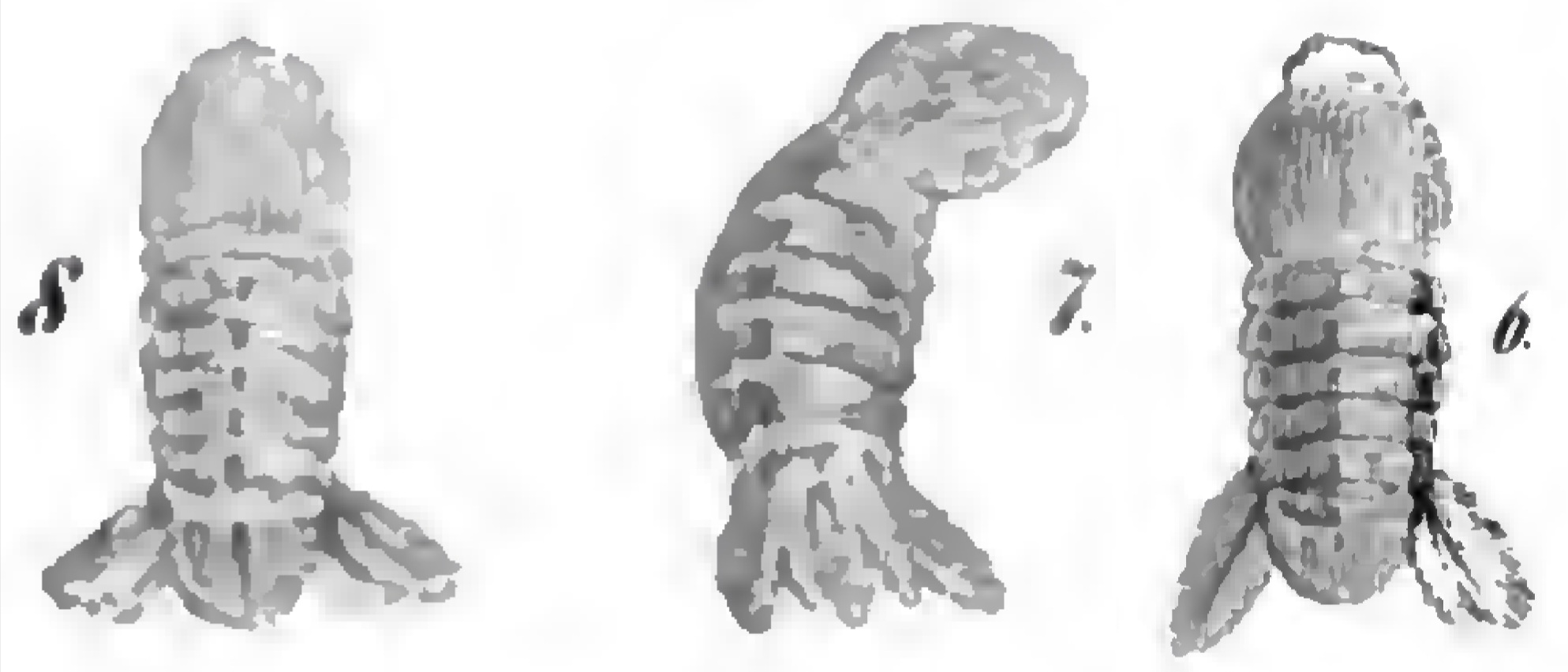
The original S. pennata fossils as illustrated in Münster's 1840 paper

Sculda was the first Mesozoic mantis shrimp to be discovered and named, being initially described by Georg zu Münster in 1840 to contain the type species S. pennata. The type series was made up of four fossil specimens collected from the Solnhofen Limestone shales in Bavaria, Germany. The generic name references Skuld, a Norn from Norse mythology. Münster did not recognize Sculda to be a mantis shrimp but instead considered it to be an isopod, partly because the characteristic raptorial appendages of mantis shrimps were not preserved in these specimens.

Buria rugosa was described by C. G. Giebel in 1857 as a new genus and species of isopod, believing it to be distinct from Sculda pennata based on number of segments and head shape. He found that Buria was both similar to and different from several extant Atlantic isopods in a variety of ways.

=== Later revisions ===
Thirty years after the genus is first named, Kunth (1870) publishes a study redescribing Sculda pennata, as well as naming two additional species referred to the genus, S. spinosa and S. pusilla. The studied material was loaned from the Berlin University collection and München paleontological collection, including 24 specimens of S. pennata, 3 specimens of S. spinosa and a single specimen of S. pusilla, all of which originate from the Solnhofen Limestone. In addition, Kunth finds that the material named as Buria rugosa is identical to that of Sculda pennata, thus the former name was discarded and declared as a junior synonym of the latter.

In 1872, Schlüter records the discovery of a new fossil mantis shrimp from Lebanon which he names Sculda laevis, but does not illustrate or describe the fossil until 1874. Over a decade later, Dames (1886) would publish a review on the previous work on fossil mantis shrimps in which he erects a new genus, Pseudosculda, and moves S. laevis into it as the type species, renaming it Pseudosculda laevis. In addition, Dames also assigns a new species, Sculda syriaca, to the genus Sculda based on two specimens found in Hakel, Lebanon. He discusses the characteristics of Sculda in great detail, comparing its species with one another. However, most of the conclusions were made based on illustrations from older literature, and Dames did not study the actual specimens of S. pennata, S. spinosa or S. pusilla.

Haug et al. (2010) published on numerous fossils of Sculda found in the Solnhofen Limestone. They noted that it was often difficult to distinguish whether a specimen belonged to S. pennata and S. spinosa due to incomplete preservation, thus several fossils were referred to ?Sculda pennata/spinosa to keep an open terminology. In addition, two specimens were assigned to S. pusilla, being the first specimens referred to the species since it was named 140 years prior. However, Haug & Haug (2021) found that these two specimens actually represent a new genus they named Tyrannosculda, and declared S. pusilla a nomen dubium.

=== Species ===
Over the years after the genus was named, several species have been assigned to Sculda. However, some have since been considered to be dubious or reassigned to different genera.

- Sculda pennata is the type species of the genus, described by Münster in 1840, and lived in the Tithonian stage of the Late Jurassic period in Bavaria, Germany.
- Sculda spinosa was named by A. Kurth in 1870 and lived during the Tithonian stage of the Late Jurassic period in Bavaria, Germany. It is known to occur alongside S. pennata in localities such as the Solnhofen Limestone. S. spinosa has been stated to differ from S. pennata in dorsal tooth count on the tergites, rostrum shape and having a wider body. However these features are often not preserved in specimens or may be results of differing degrees of segment extension, making it commonly difficult to distinguish between the two. It has been proposed that S. spinosa may be synonymous with S. pennata, though this remains unconfirmed.
- Sculda syriaca was named by W. Dames in 1886 based on specimens from Cenomanian-aged deposits in Hakel, Lebanon.

=== Doubtful species ===
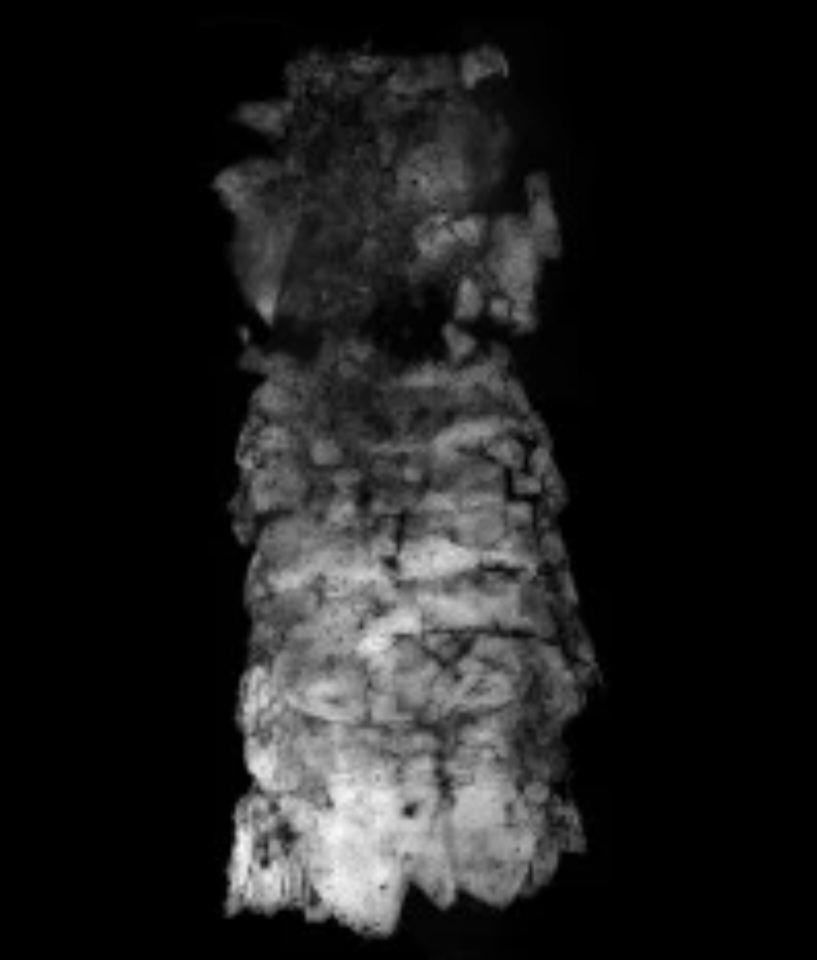
Only known fossil of S. pusilla, currently a nomen dubium

- Sculda pusilla was named by Kunth in 1870 and based on a single fragmentary specimen. Several additional specimens from the Solnhofen Limestone were assigned to this species by Haug et al. (2010). However, Haug & Haug (2021) found that all referred specimens lack the rows of dorsal spines observed in the S. pusilla holotype, thus they were moved to a new genus named Tyrannosculda, while S. pusilla was declared as a nomen dubium.

=== Reassigned species ===
- Sculda laevis was the name given by C.L. Schlüter in 1872 to a specimen from Cretaceous deposits in Lebanon. He fully described and illustrated the species two years later in 1874, and expressed doubt towards its classification, noting that the telson more closely resembles that of Sculda but the cephalothorax suggests a relationship with Squilla. In 1886, W. Dames moved S. leavis to his newly established genus Pseudosculda, of which this species became the type species.
- Sculda sp. was the designation tentatively given in 1999 to a single fossil found in the Turonian siliceous shales of Colombia, based on the telson morphology. In 2004 this specimen was reassigned to Pseudosculda based on the appearance of the raptorial appendages. However, Ahyong et al. (2007) states the Colombian specimen is definitely not Pseudosculda, and perhaps not even a pseudosculdid.

== Description ==
Sculda is a small crustacean, not exceeding 50 mm (2.0 in) in length. The type species, S. pennata, ranges from 22–46 mm (0.87–1.81 in) in length. S. spinosa is smaller, with the three specimens analysed by Kunth (1870) measuring from 31.3–35 mm (1.23–1.38 in).

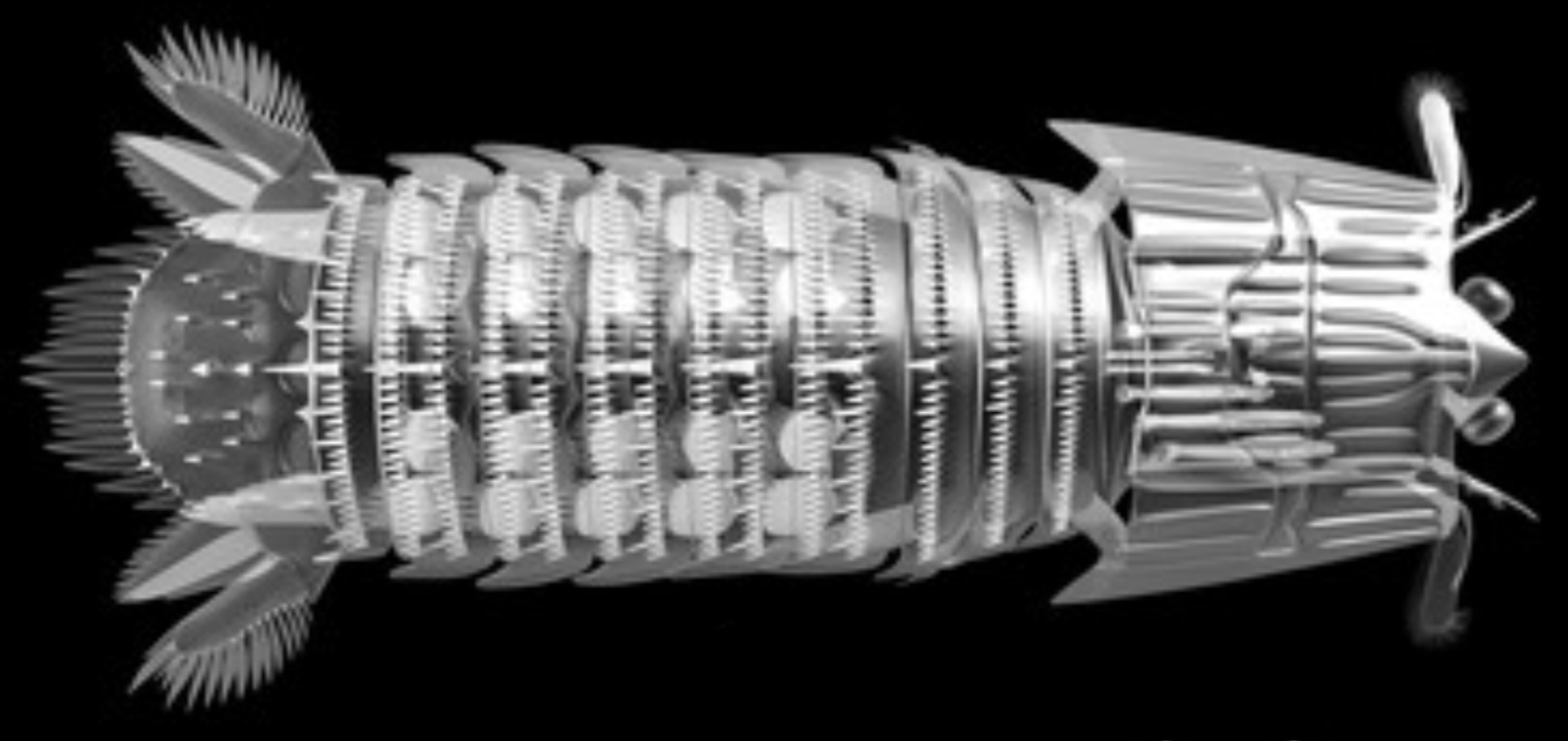
3D reconstruction of Sculda as viewed from above

The carapace shield of Sculda is dorsoventrally flattened, with prominent, almost spine-like grooves and ridges running from the front to the back of the shield. Like other mantis shrimps, this genus has enlarged raptorial appendages for catching prey, with the frontmost pair being the largest (though the size difference between pairs is less notable than in Tyrannosculda). The raptorial appendages of Sculda have no spines, and the propodus (sub-terminal segment) is extremely widened and enlarged, whereas the dactylus (terminal segment) is sharp and blade-like. This morphology in the raptorial appendages is not known in modern mantis shrimps.

The tergites of the pleon are ornamented with rows of backward-pointing dorsal teeth. The telson is large and wide, with two uropods on either side. Prominent spines are present on the margins of the uropods, giving them a feather-like appearance. The appendages are short and curved, not visible when the animal is viewed from above. The pleopods (swimming appendages) are biramous, each branching into an exopod and an endopod, both of which have many setae along their edges and are shaped like paddles.

== Classification ==
When it was first described, Sculda was believed to be a type of isopod, with Münster suggesting it to be a member of the family Cymothoidae based on its short, curved legs pressing against its body. As more remains were discovered, it became apparent that Sculda is actually a mantis shrimp. Dames (1886) erected the family Sculdidae in which this genus was placed, and to this day this remains the accepted classification. The family belongs in the suborder Unipeltata, which contains all extant mantis shrimps as well as some extinct species from the Mesozoic and Cenozoic eras. While Sculdidae was originally a monotypic family, with Sculda as its type and only genus, two more genera were assigned to it in the 21st century (namely Nodosculda and Spinosculda).

Smith et al. (2023) conducted a phylogenetic analysis to determine the relations between fossil mantis shrimps, which recovered the genus Sculda to be monophyletic. However, the family Sculdidae was found to be polyphyletic. The results of the analysis are displayed in the cladogram below:

- Stomatopoda
  - †Archaeocaris
    - Archaeocaris vermiformis
    - Archaeocaris graffhami
  - - - †Bairdops elegans
      - †Perimecturus
        - Perimecturus parki
        - Perimecturus rapax
    - †Bairdops beargulchensis
    - - †Daidal pattoni
      - - - - †Daidal schoellmanni
            - †Daidal acanthocercus
          - †Gorgonophontes
            - Gorgonophontes fraiponti
            - Gorgonophontes peleron
        - - †Chabardella spinosa
        - - †Tyrannophontes theridion
          - - †Tyrannophontes gigantion
            - Unipeltata
              - †Triassosculda ahyongi
              - - †Tyrannosculda laurae
                - - †Pseudosculda laevis
                  - - †Archaeosculda phoenicia
                    - - - †Sculda pennata
                        - †Sculda syriaca
                      - - †Ursquilla yehoachi
                        - - †Lysiosquilla nkporoensis
                          - - †Nodosculda fisherorum
                            - Squilla mantis

== Palaeobiology ==
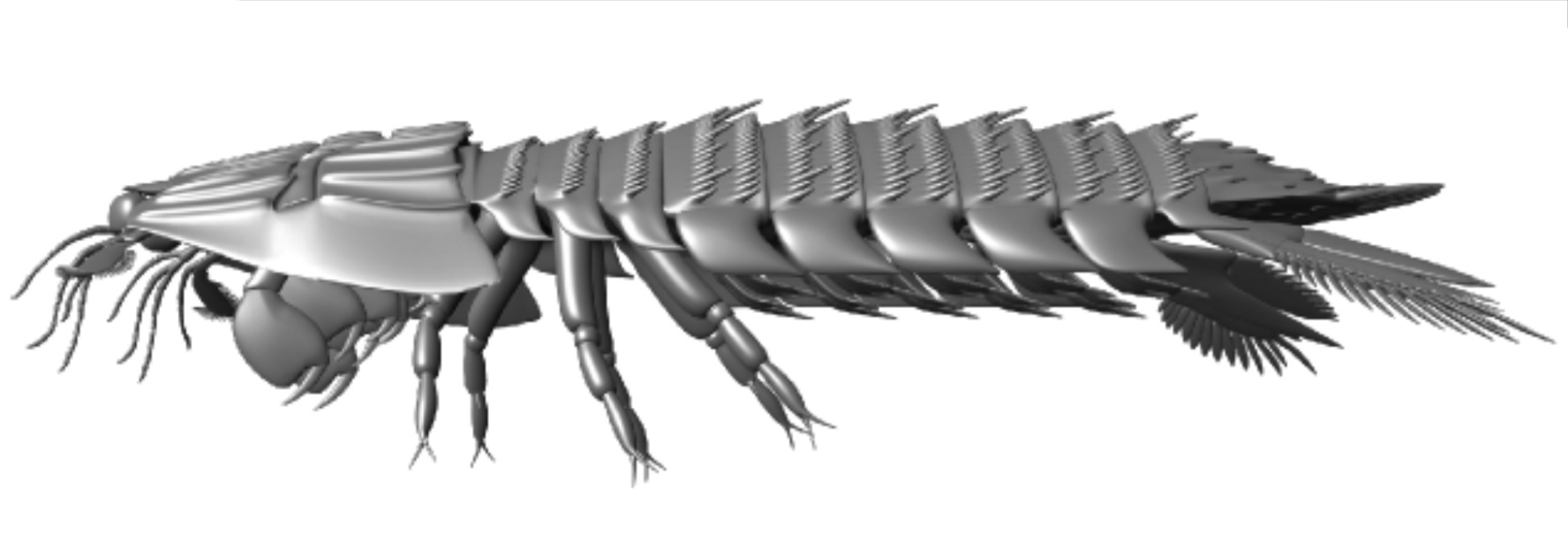
Reconstruction of Sculda viewed from the side, with the raptorial appendages visible

Based on its raptorial appendages and the ecology of other mantis shrimps, Sculda would have been a carnivorous marine animal. The morphology of these appendages in Sculda is unlike that of any extant mantis shrimp, with a greatly enlarged propodus (sub-terminal segment), but sharp and slender dactylus (terminal segment). Haug et al. (2010) proposed that the propodus may have been used to directly strike prey, smashing and bludgeoning it in a manner similar to modern smasher type mantis shrimps, before using the dactylus to cut the prey up. Sculda would have developed this behaviour separately from modern smasher mantis shrimps, an example of convergent evolution.
