= Triassosculda =

Triassosculda Temporal range: 250.6 Ma

Scientific classification
- Kingdom: Animalia
- Phylum: Arthropoda
- Clade: Pancrustacea
- Class: Malacostraca
- Order: Stomatopoda
- Genus: †Triassosculda; Smith et al. 2023
- Species: †T. ahyongi

Binomial name
- †Triassosculda ahyongi Smith et al. 2023

Extinct genus of mantis shrimp

Triassosculda is an extinct genus of mantis shrimp from the Early Triassic aged Paris biota of Idaho. Its discovery bridged a 100-million-year gap in mantis shrimp evolution from the late Carboniferous to the Jurassic. Its only species is T. ahyongi.

== Discovery and naming ==
Triassosculda is currently known from two fossil specimens, both of which were excavated from the Paris Canyon in Idaho, US. The holotype (UBGD 30550) consists of the animal's posterior region preserved in ventral view, including the telson, uropods and last three segments of the pleon. The paratype (UBGD 294010) preserves a large part of the abdomen and possible uropods in dorsolateral view.

In 2023, the genus Triassosculda was described based on these remains, with T. ahyongi as the type and only species. The generic name is combined from "Triassic" (in reference to its age) and "sculda" (a common suffix in the names of Mesozoic stomatopods). The specific name honors Shane T. Ahyong, a zoologist who has studied the evolution of mantis shrimps.

== Description ==
The fossil material of Triassosculda demonstrates features which are transitional between those of basal and derived mantis shrimps; most significantly it has a broad and triangular telson, while older Carboniferous species have a narrow telson and younger Mesozoic members have a square telson. The morphology of Triassosculda matches the hypotheses that ancestral mantis shrimps had a more shrimp-like body plan which evolved to become more lobster-like; its abdomen is tall and narrow like that of a shrimp, but also stretched out straight, indicating a sprawling lobster-like stance.

== Classification ==
Smith et al. (2023) recovered Triassosculda as a basal member of the clade Unipeltata. The cladogram results of their phylogenetic analyses are displayed in the cladogram below:

- Stomatopoda
  - †Archaeocaris
    - Archaeocaris vermiformis
    - Archaeocaris graffhami
  - - - †Bairdops elegans
      - †Perimecturus
        - Perimecturus parki
        - Perimecturus rapax
    - †Bairdops beargulchensis
    - - †Daidal pattoni
      - - - - †Daidal schoellmanni
            - †Daidal acanthocercus
          - †Gorgonophontes
            - Gorgonophontes fraiponti
            - Gorgonophontes peleron
        - - †Chabardella spinosa
        - - †Tyrannophontes theridion
          - - †Tyrannophontes gigantion
            - Unipeltata
              - †Triassosculda ahyongi
              - - †Tyrannosculda laurae
                - - †Pseudosculda laevis
                  - - †Archaeosculda phoenicia
                    - - - †Sculda pennata
                        - †Sculda syriaca
                      - - †Ursquilla yehoachi
                        - - †Lysiosquilla nkporoensis
                          - - †Nodosculda fisherorum
                            - Squilla mantis

== Palaeoenvironment ==
Triassosculda was discovered in deposits of Paris Canyon, Idaho, dating back to the earliest Spathian age of the early Triassic period, around 250.6 million years ago. It is part of a diverse fossil assemblage known as the Paris biota, which would have lived in a shallow inland sea on the western coast of Pangaea near the equator. Many other fossil animals are also parts of the Paris biota and would have lived alongside Triassosculda, including other crustaceans, thylacocephalans, ammonoids, nautiloids, bivalves and fish.
