= Chabardella =

Chabardella Temporal range: Late Carboniferous (Stephanian), 301.5–300.5 Ma

Scientific classification
- Kingdom: Animalia
- Phylum: Arthropoda
- Class: Malacostraca
- Order: Stomatopoda
- Family: †Gorgonophontidae
- Genus: †Chabardella; Racheboeuf, Schram and Vidal, 2009
- Species: †C. spinosa

Binomial name
- †Chabardella spinosa Racheboeuf, Schram and Vidal, 2009

Extinct genus of mantis shrimp

Chabardella is an extinct genus of mantis shrimp which lived during the Late Carboniferous in France. It was named in 2009, with C. spinosa as the type and only species.

== Discovery and naming ==
The fossil material of Chabardella was discovered in the Saint-Louis opencast pit in Montceau-les-Mines, France, which dates to the Stephanian B and C substages of the Late Carboniferous period. A research program on the fossil content of this site began in 2000, during which the only known specimen was found in a concretion. This fossil belongs to the National Museum of Natural History, France and was deposited in an off-site facility in Autun.

In 2009, Racheboeuf, Schram and Vidal described Chabardella spinosa as a new genus and species of mantis shrimp based on this fossil. The holotype specimen, MNHN-SOT 28610, consists of the external mold of a weathered, near-complete exoskeleton, preserving its left side. The generic name honors D. Chabard, who was curator of the Muséum d'histoire naturelle d'Autun and therefore in charge of the Montceau-les-Mines fossil collection. The specific name, spinosa, references the rows of spines on the margins of the animal's segments.

== Description ==
Chabardella was a small crustacean, with an arched body reaching a total length of around 30 mm (1.2 in). The animal's body was laterally compressed, being flattened from side to side and appearing narrow when viewed from above. Like other mantis shrimps, Chabardella has raptorial maxillipeds (feeding appendages): the second to fifth segments of the thorax each bear a pair of enlarged thoracopods which would have been used to capture prey. The raptorial appendages of the frontmost pair are each 1.5 mm (0.059 in) wide at the base, larger than those of the other three pairs (which are each 1 mm (0.039 in) wide at the base).

Though the carapace is poorly preserved, it has been estimated to be 7.5 mm (0.30 in) long and 5.5 mm (0.22 in) high, and is known to cover the head and front part of the thorax, whereas the last four thoracic segments were left exposed. The segments of the thorax are short but tall, each measuring around 1.5 mm (0.059 in) long and 4 mm (0.16 in) tall. The abdomen is split into six segments, which decrease in size along the animal's length: the first abdominal segment is 2.5 mm (0.098 in) long and 4 mm (0.16 in) tall, whereas the last is only 1.3 mm (0.051 in) long and 2 mm (0.079 in) tall. The telson is elongated and subtriangular in shape, and the uropod has a short, blade-like base. The rest of the tail fan is not preserved and thus poorly known.

The hind margin of each thoracic and abdominal segment is almost vertical, and possesses ridges with five or six short, backward-pointing spines on each side. These spines are largest near the middle of the crustacean's back, decreasing in size down its sides. The hind segments also have slightly larger spines than the segments further front. These spines are a feature unique to Chabardella, and are unknown in other Paleozoic mantis shrimps.

== Classification ==
Because the frontmost pair of raptorial appendages is larger than the latter pairs, Racheboeuf, Schram and Vidal (2009) recognized Chabardella as a close relative of Gorgonophontes, which also has this feature. The authors thus placed Chabardella into Gorgonophontidae, making it the second genus assigned to this family. This placement was first questioned by Haug et al. (2010), which found Chabardella, Gorgonophontes and the Tyrannophontes+Unipeltata clade to form an unresolved polytomy. However, they acknowledge this result may have been due to the lack of data on the tail fan of Chabardella, which is poorly preserved. Smith et al. (2023) conducted a phylogenetic analysis which also placed Chabardella in an unresolved polytomy, and further suggests the incomplete knowledge of Daidal pattoni may have also led to this result. The results of their phylogenetic analyses are displayed in the cladogram below:

- Stomatopoda
  - †Archaeocaris
    - Archaeocaris vermiformis
    - Archaeocaris graffhami
  - - - †Bairdops elegans
      - †Perimecturus
        - Perimecturus parki
        - Perimecturus rapax
    - †Bairdops beargulchensis
    - - †Daidal pattoni
      - - - - †Daidal schoellmanni
            - †Daidal acanthocercus
          - †Gorgonophontes
            - Gorgonophontes fraiponti
            - Gorgonophontes peleron
        - - †Chabardella spinosa
        - - †Tyrannophontes theridion
          - - †Tyrannophontes gigantion
            - Unipeltata
              - †Triassosculda ahyongi
              - - †Tyrannosculda laurae
                - - †Pseudosculda laevis
                  - - †Archaeosculda phoenicia
                    - - - †Sculda pennata
                        - †Sculda syriaca
                      - - †Ursquilla yehoachi
                        - - †Lysiosquilla nkporoensis
                          - - †Nodosculda fisherorum
                            - Squilla mantis
