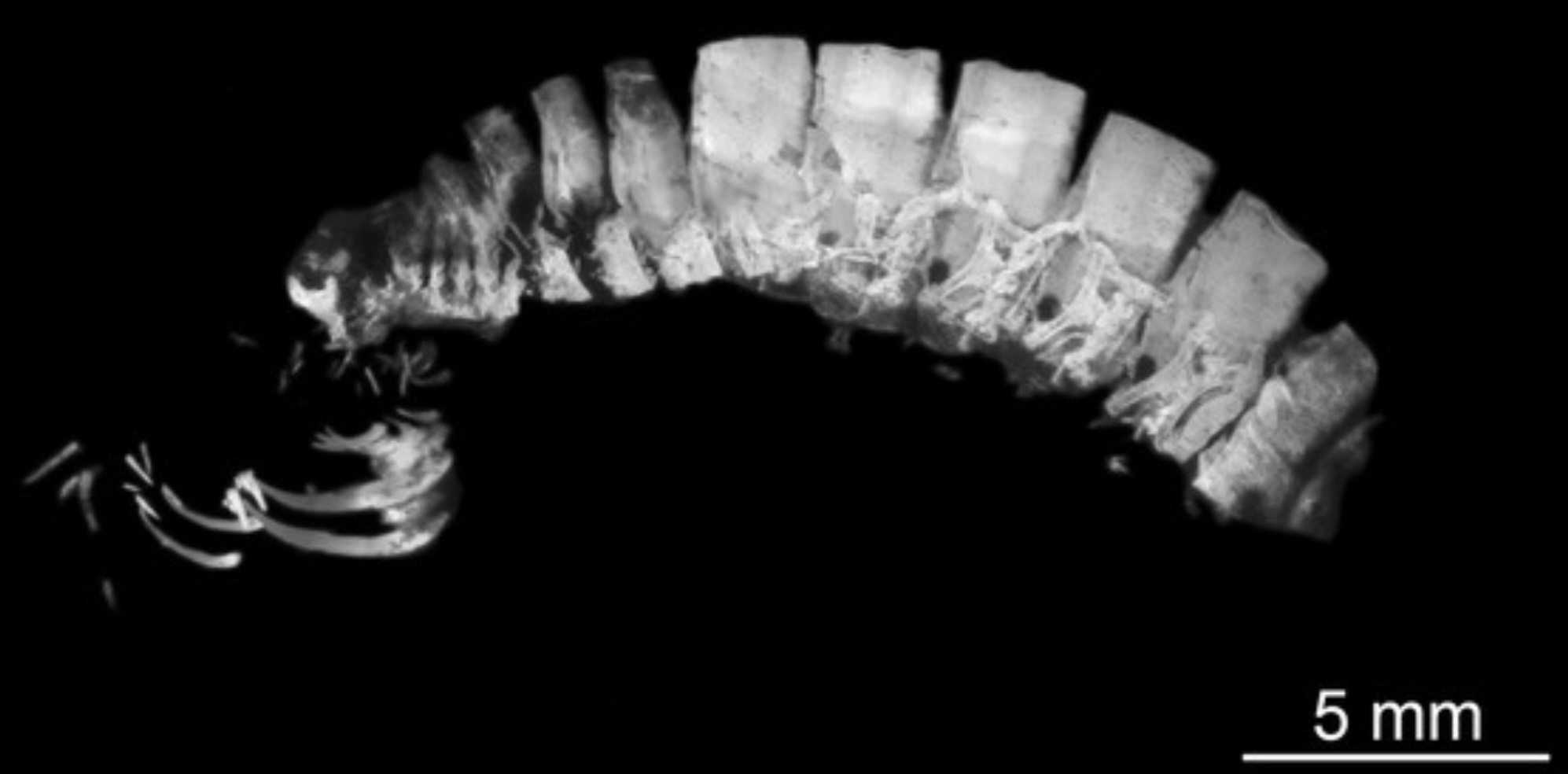
- Fossil of a very late juvenile

Scientific classification
- Kingdom: Animalia
- Phylum: Arthropoda
- Class: Malacostraca
- Order: Stomatopoda
- Genus: †Tyrannosculda; Haug and Haug, 2021
- Species: †T. laurae

Binomial name
- †Tyrannosculda laurae Haug and Haug, 2021

= Tyrannosculda =

Tyrannosculda Temporal range: Late Jurassic (Tithonian), 150 Ma

Extinct genus of mantis shrimp

Tyrannosculda is an extinct genus of mantis shrimp which lived during the Late Jurassic in southern Germany. It was named in 2021, with T. laurae as the type and only species. Several fossil specimens are known, representing various growth stages.

Unlike modern mantis shrimps, which are mostly benthic animals, Tyrannosculda is believed to have been a necto-benthic predator that hunted while it swam. It had enlarged raptorial appendages which would have been used to grab prey from above.

== Discovery and naming ==
The genus Tyrannosculda was erected in 2021, with T. laurae as the type and only species. The generic name references the similarity of this species to both Tyrannophontes and Sculda, and the specific name honors Laura Frattigiani, Laichingen. Tyrannosculda is known from several specimens, all originating from Jurassic aged deposits in southern Germany. The holotype (SMNS 67592/1) was collected from the Eichstätt Subformation of the Altmühltal Group (Solnhofen Limestone) at Blumenberg quarry, and four other specimens were designated as paratypes.

Some fossils now referred to this genus were formerly assigned to ?Sculda pusilla, a taxon otherwise known from a single specimen. However these fossils do not have rows of dorsal spines like those of the Sculda pusilla holotype and thus were reclassified. Sculda pusilla is currently deemed a nomen dubium.

== Description ==
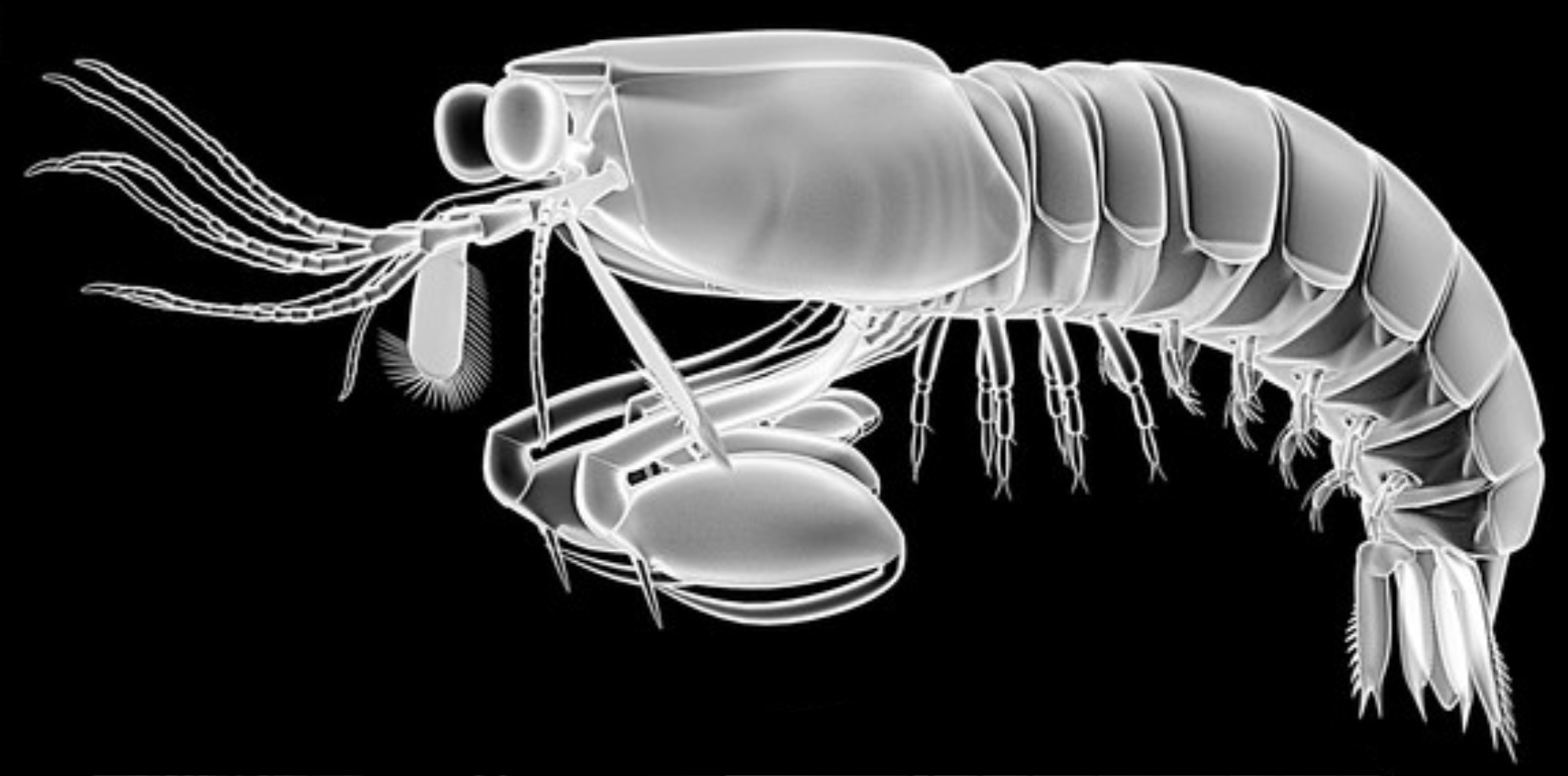
3D reconstruction of an adult

Tyrannosculda is a crustacean of moderate size, with a subcylindrical body (presumably) arranged into 20 segments (an ocular segment and 19 appendage-bearing segments). A pair of large compound eyes are attached to the ocular segment by short stalks. A pronounced shield, roughly trapezoidal when viewed from the side, is formed by the upper surface of the front of the body, though poor preservation makes it unclear which segments make up this shield. This shield extends backwards to envelop the entire height of the body up to the fifth thorax segment. Prominent grooves (most likely gastric grooves) running front to back are present at around two fifths the height of the shield. Unlike in Sculda, the shield of Tyrannosculda has no anterior-posterior oriented ridges or cervical groove, and is more subcylindrical in shape.

Like other mantis shrimps, Tyrannosculda has enlarged raptorial appendages which would have been used to capture prey. These are located on the seventh to tenth post-ocular segments, with the frontmost pair (on the seventh post-ocular segment) being the largest. Overall, each raptorial appendage is arranged in a Z-shape, with the three distal segments of the appendage folded against the proximal one, and the terminal appendage segment folded against the one before it. This terminal segment is curved and pointed with a scimitar shape. The sub-terminal segment of the largest raptorial appendages is swollen and enlarged, with small spines or serrations along the median edge, and is widest in the middle with rounded areas at the joints.

The upper surface of the post-ocular segments are weakly sclerotized, and a tergite is present on each segment. These tergites are smooth and not ornamented, unlike those of Sculda or Spinosculda which have backward-pointing spines. The thoracopods (walking appendages) are tubular and short, incapable of supporting a wide stance, and located on the 11th to 13th post-ocular segments. The pleopods are biramous (branching in two); the exopods have four or five annuli, and the endopods are paddle-shaped with two or three distal setae.

== Classification ==
Haug and Haug (2021) recovered Tyrannosculda as a member of the clade Unipeltata, and noted that this genus is more closely related to all modern mantis shrimp species than to any Carboniferous forms. Smith et al. (2023) conducted a phylogenetic analysis which also supports the placement of Tyrannosculda as an early diverging member of Unipeltata, the results of which are displayed in the cladogram below:

- Stomatopoda
  - †Archaeocaris
    - Archaeocaris vermiformis
    - Archaeocaris graffhami
  - - - †Bairdops elegans
      - †Perimecturus
        - Perimecturus parki
        - Perimecturus rapax
    - †Bairdops beargulchensis
    - - †Daidal pattoni
      - - - - †Daidal schoellmanni
            - †Daidal acanthocercus
          - †Gorgonophontes
            - Gorgonophontes fraiponti
            - Gorgonophontes peleron
        - - †Chabardella spinosa
        - - †Tyrannophontes theridion
          - - †Tyrannophontes gigantion
            - Unipeltata
              - †Triassosculda ahyongi
              - - †Tyrannosculda laurae
                - - †Pseudosculda laevis
                  - - †Archaeosculda phoenicia
                    - - - †Sculda pennata
                        - †Sculda syriaca
                      - - †Ursquilla yehoachi
                        - - †Lysiosquilla nkporoensis
                          - - †Nodosculda fisherorum
                            - Squilla mantis

== Palaeobiology ==
Like other mantis shrimp species, Tyrannosculda would have been a predator, using its raptorial appendages to capture invertebrates and similar small prey. Similarly to the Carboniferous genera Gorgonophontes and Tyrannophontes, the walking appendages of Tyrannosculda were short and would not allow a wide stance, and the animal also seems incapable of lifting the front of its body to catch prey while standing on the ground. Therefore, it is unlikely that these early mantis shrimps were benthic (bottom dwelling) animals like modern mantis shrimps. Instead, it has been theorized that they were necto-benthic predators, hunting while they swam by grabbing their prey from above. In extant mantis shrimps, only the larvae primarily hunt this way. It has thus been proposed that the study of mantis shrimp larvae is necessary to further understand the biology of these early forms.

=== Ontogeny ===
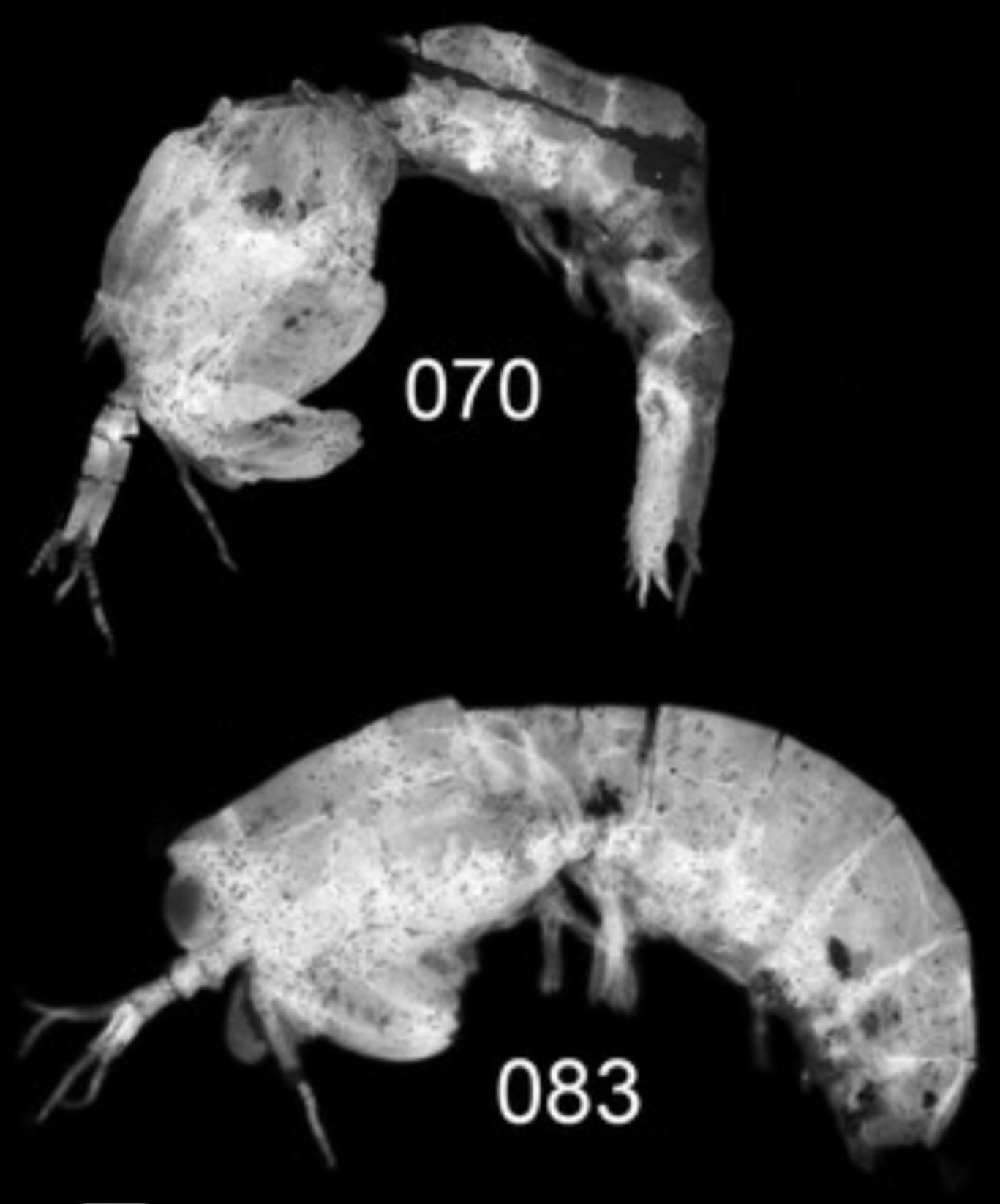
Fossil specimens of early juveniles

Some of the known specimens of Tyrannosculda appear to represent different growth stages of the animal, ranging from early juveniles to adults, though there is not currently enough known material to reconstruct the entire growth sequence. In younger individuals, the tergites on the upper surface become shorter and more tapering the further they are from the head, whereas in late juveniles and adults, the tergites all have similar dimensions.

== Palaeoenvironment ==
The fossils of Tyrannosculda were excavated from the Eichstätt subformation of the Solnhofen Limestone in Germany, which dates to the Tithonian age of the late Jurassic period, around 150 million years old. At the time of deposition, this area would have been an archipelago at the edge of the Tethys Ocean, with a series of lagoons cut off by reefs from the main ocean. A diverse array of fossil marine animals are known from the Solnhofen Limestone and would have been contemporaries of Tyrannosculda. These included invertebrates such as crinoids, cephalopods and other crustaceans, as well as many types of fish. Larger marine reptiles such as metriorhynchids and the ichthyosaur Aegirosaurus were also present.
