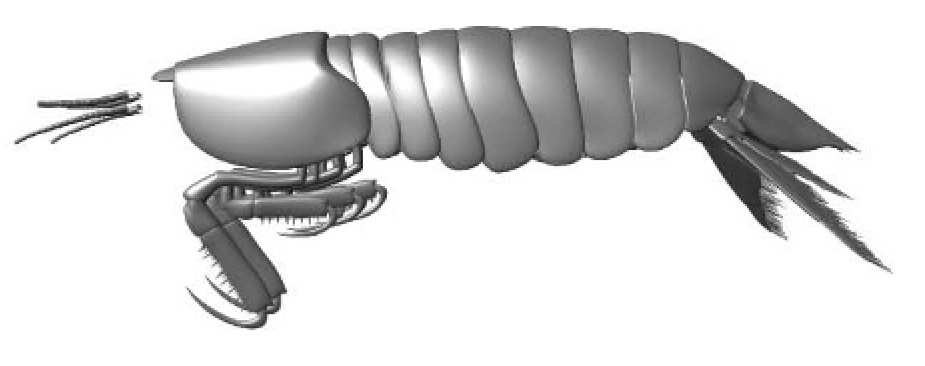
- 3D reconstruction of Gorgonophontes fraiponti

Scientific classification
- Kingdom: Animalia
- Phylum: Arthropoda
- Clade: Pancrustacea
- Class: Malacostraca
- Order: Stomatopoda
- Suborder: †Archaeostomatopodea
- Family: †Gorgonophontidae; Schram, 2007

Genera
- †Chabardella; †Gorgonophontes

= Gorgonophontidae =

Gorgonophontidae Temporal range: Moscovian–Gzhelian

Family of crustaceans

Gorgonophontidae is a family of fossil mantis shrimps which lived from the Moscovian to Gzhelian stages of the Carboniferous period. It was erected in 2007 as a monotypic group by Frederick Schram to contain only the type genus Gorgonophontes (which it is named after). A second genus, Chabardella, was assigned to the family in 2009. Fossils of gorgonophontids have been found in France, Belgium and the United States. The family may be polyphyletic.
