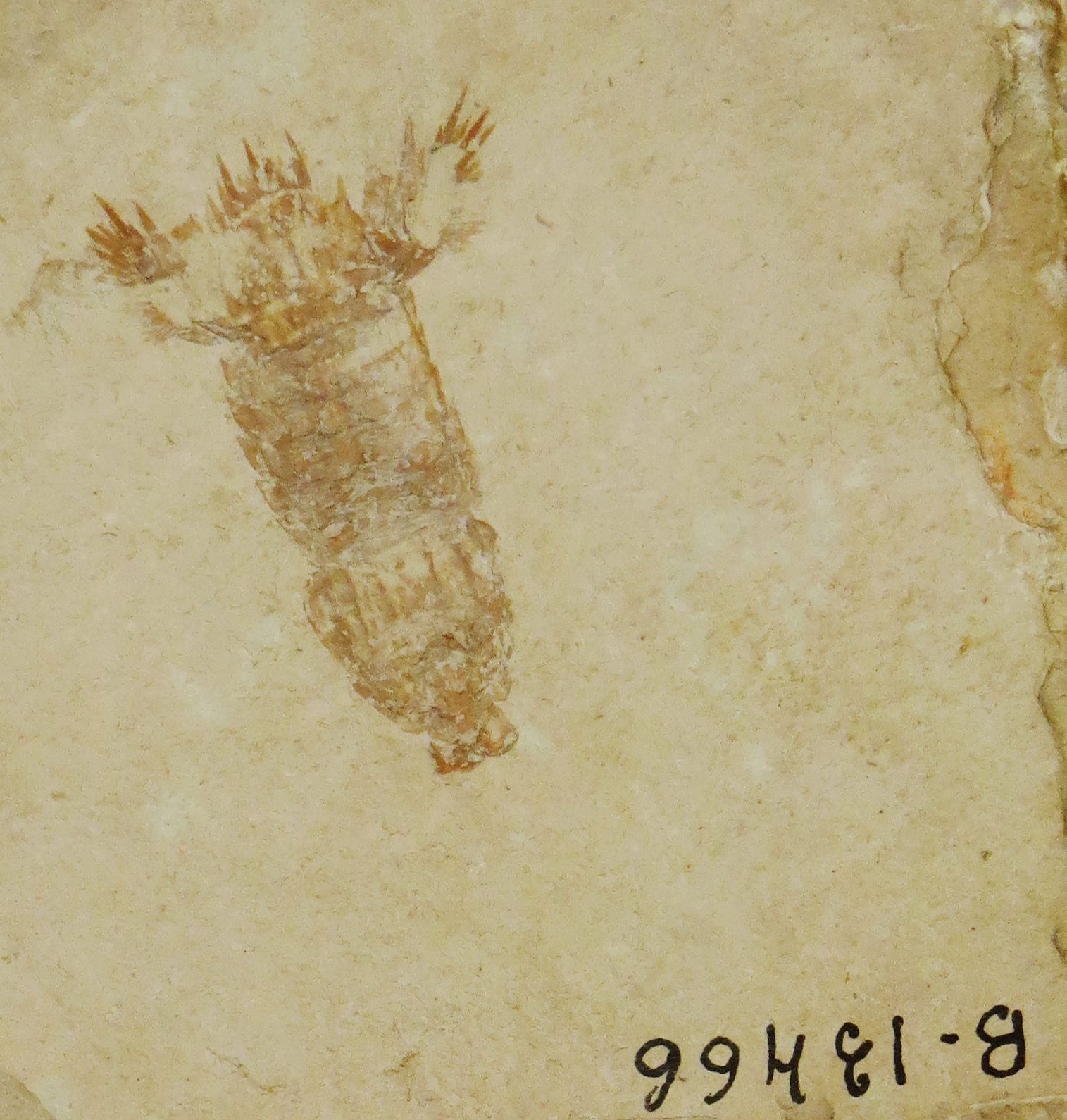
- Fossil of Sculda pennata

Scientific classification
- Kingdom: Animalia
- Phylum: Arthropoda
- Clade: Pancrustacea
- Class: Malacostraca
- Order: Stomatopoda
- Suborder: Unipeltata
- Family: †Sculdidae; Dames, 1886

Genera
- Nodosculda; Sculda; Spinosculda

= Sculdidae =

Sculdidae Temporal range: Tithonian–Cenomanian

Family of crustaceans

Sculdidae is a family of fossil mantis shrimps which lived from the late Jurassic to late Cretaceous periods. It was erected in 1886 to contain the type genus Sculda (which it is named after), and other genera have since been assigned to it. Fossils of sculdids have been found in Germany, Lebanon and the United States. The family may be polyphyletic.
