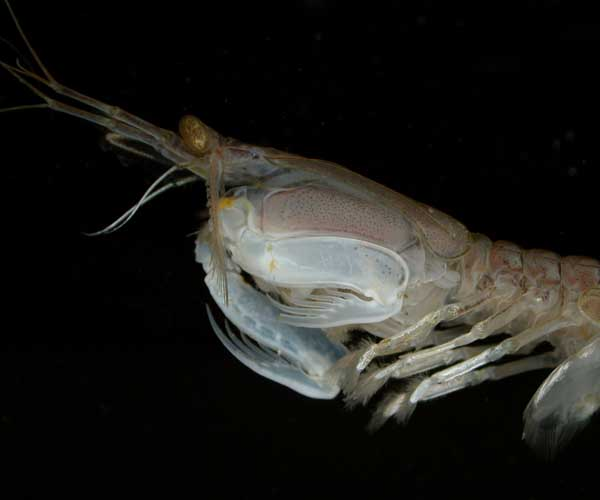
- Squilla mantis

Scientific classification
- Kingdom: Animalia
- Phylum: Arthropoda
- Clade: Pancrustacea
- Class: Malacostraca
- Order: Stomatopoda
- Family: Squillidae
- Genus: Squilla; Fabricius, 1787

Type species
- Cancer mantis Linnaeus, 1758

= Squilla =

Genus of crustaceans

Squilla is a genus of mantis shrimp found in marine habitats in tropical and sub-tropical climates all over the world, such as the Indian Ocean and Mediterranean sea. They are often caught unintentionally by fisheries in their climate, and they are not used for human food or fish meal, though valuable compounds such as chitin and chitosan can be extracted from their shells. The genus first appeared in the fossil record 145 million years ago.

== Taxonomy ==
This genus includes the following species:

- Squilla aculeata Bigelow, 1893
- Squilla biformis Bigelow, 1891
- Squilla bigelowi Schmitt, 1940
- Squilla brasiliensis Calman, 1917
- Squilla cadenati Manning, 1970
- Squilla caribaea Manning, 1969
- Squilla chydaea Manning, 1962
- Squilla deceptrix Manning, 1969
- Squilla discors Manning, 1962
- Squilla edentata (Lunz, 1937)
- Squilla empusa Say, 1818
- Squilla grenadensis Manning, 1969
- Squilla hancocki Schmitt, 1940
- Squilla intermedia Bigelow, 1893
- Squilla latreillei
- Squilla lijdingi Holthuis, 1959
- Squilla mantis (Linnaeus, 1758)
- Squilla mantoidea Bigelow, 1893
- Squilla obtusa Holthuis, 1959
- Squilla panamensis Bigelow, 1891
- Squilla parva Bigelow, 1891
- Squilla rugosa Bigelow, 1893
- Squilla surinamica Holthuis, 1959
- Squilla tiburonensis Schmitt, 1940

== Description ==
Though the many species of the Squilla genus vary greatly in location, they are all defined by a few common shared traits, or synapomorphies. One of those notable ones is the number of teeth on their claw, which tends to be of a middling size. Because Squilla lack a hardened "smashing" appendage like some of their fellow stomatopod genera, they cannot break open hard shells, and thus largely subsist on soft-bodied prey for food. The claw of the Squilla genus is known to have six teeth. Another defining trait is the lack of a raised ridge in the exoskeleton of Squilla — or rather, the extension of the ridge over the entire exoskeleton, as such creating the appearance of the lack of a ridge. Often referred to as a "carina", this ridge can be used to differentiate Squilla from other similar stomatopods.

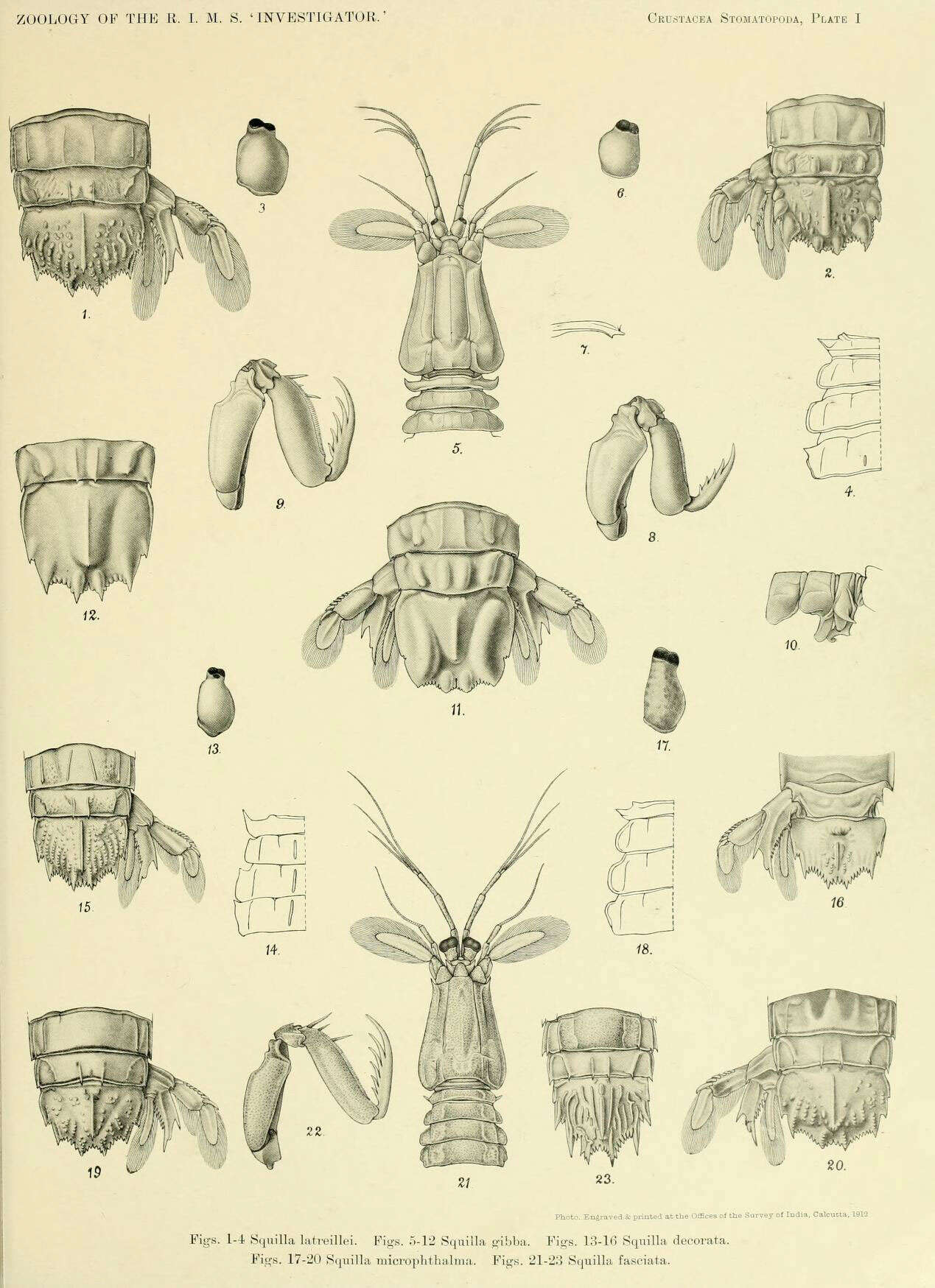
A 1913 account of a species within the Squilla genus, found in the Indo-Pacific region of Calcutta.

Aside from these major features used to differentiate Squilla, other features include a tail plate with four to six spines, unlike the fused tail plates found in other stomatopods, and shorter antennular peduncles, which are the structures at the base of the shrimp's antennae that attach them to their head.

Squilla are small, bilaterally symmetrical marine organisms, with a size range of 40–70 millimetres (1.6–2.8 in). The males and females tend to be the same size. All the different species possess a form that is typical of most other stomatopods, consisting of extended eyestalks, a rostrum, carapace, and a raptorial claw used for hunting.

Additionally, Squilla have developed a nauplius eye, which is an eye that is composed of three to four pigment ocelli. Likely, this eye only allows the organism to determine the location of a light source. This means species within the Squilla genus have poorer eyesight than their more famous counterparts of the Odontodactylus genus, which can see more colors than even humans.

== Behavior ==
Squilla are predatory benthic burrowers, akin to many other . They dig holes in the sand, hide, and await soft bodied prey that they are able to snatch up with their relatively weak claw. This means that, unlike other genera of Stomatopods, Squilla cannot typically consume prey with hard shells. They tend to prey on other benthic organisms such as worms, krill, small fish, and even other species of Squilla when they are able. Their burrowing habit makes them a bio-diffuser, as they engage in ecosystem engineering that scatters organic and inorganic particles about the ocean floor. Despite their small size, Squilla has found great success with their strategy, as they have been around for over one hundred million years and have diversified into over a dozen different species.

=== Life cycle ===
Squilla go through five maturity stages, that being the immature, early maturation, maturation, ripe, and spent stages, with their life cycle ending shortly after they reproduce (semelparity). Their life cycles are short, being only eighteen months at the longest, and their reproductive season begins in spring, with most females going from maturation to ripe in winter and ending their life cycle spent in summer. In the studies that determined this, the stage of a female's life cycle was determined by how much space her ovaries consumed in regards to her entire body mass. In spring and summer, females tend to hide in galleries and tend to their eggs, leading to fisheries to catch more males. But in autumn, the females will leave the galleries and become more vulnerable to being caught by humans.

== Relation to humans ==
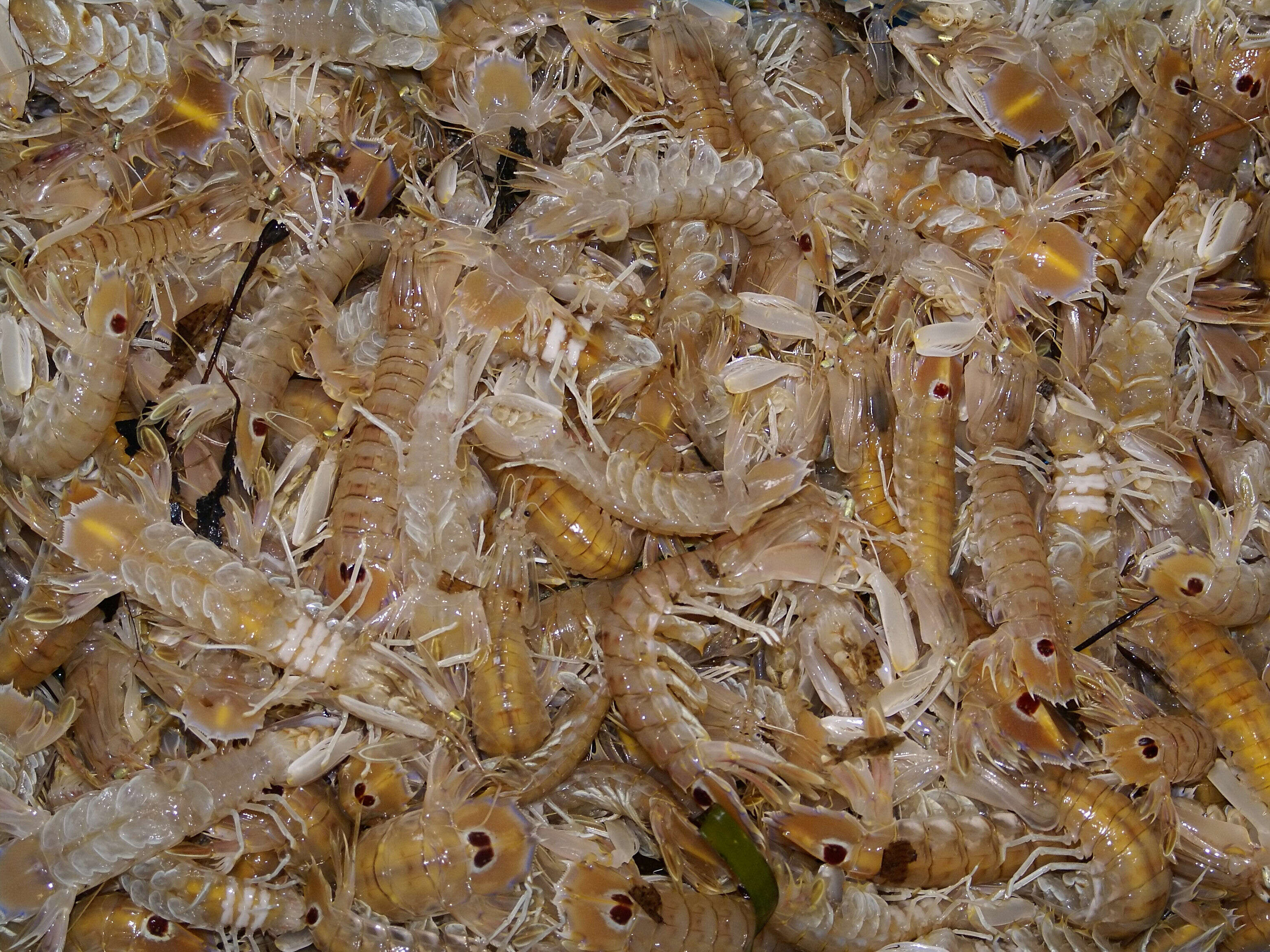
Squilla exoskeletons being harvested for chitosan production.

Though Squilla offers little nutritional value due to its very small size, the compounds chitin and chitosan are able to be extracted from Squilla exoskeletons, as is the case with many crustacean species. Chitosan, in particular, has been found to reduce blood plasma levels of HDL in humans, as well as protect against the growth of some microorganisms, most notably the yeast Candida. New research has also demonstrated that chitosan produced from Squilla shells may also be beneficial in fighting other fungus infections and cancerous growths.

These chemicals are extracted by first collecting large amounts of Squilla, which is often done unintentionally by fisheries who catch Squilla in their net while fishing for other larger species. These catches are then shelled, and the shells are put through multiple chemical treatments, including demineralization, decolorization, deproteinization, and deacetylation, before they can become finished commercial grade chitosan.
