= Victor van Straelen =

Belgian conservationist, palaeontologist and carcinologist

- Born: June 14, 1889; Antwerp, Belgium
- Died: February 29, 1964 (aged 74)
- Known for: Instigating the world's first gorilla sanctuary (Virunga National Park); Founding executive committee member of IUCN
- Awards: Darwin-Wallace Medal (1958)
- Scientific career
- Fields: Conservation, palaeontology, carcinology

Victor van Straelen (14 June 1889 – 29 February 1964) was a Belgian conservationist, palaeontologist and carcinologist.

== Biography ==
Van Straelen was born in Antwerp on 14 June 1889 and worked chiefly as a palaeontologist until his retirement in 1954.

He was director of the Royal Belgian Institute of Natural Sciences from 1925 to 1954. In 1926, he instigated the world's first gorilla sanctuary in what became the Parc National Albert (now Virunga National Park). In 1933, he was appointed head of the Institut des Parcs Nationaux du Congo Belge, and in 1948, he was on the executive committee at the foundation of the organisation which would become the International Union for Conservation of Nature (IUCN). He was the first president of the Charles Darwin Foundation from its foundation in 1959 until his death in 1964.

He was awarded a silver Darwin-Wallace Medal by the Linnean Society of London in 1958.
