= Uropod =

Anatomical structure in Crustacea

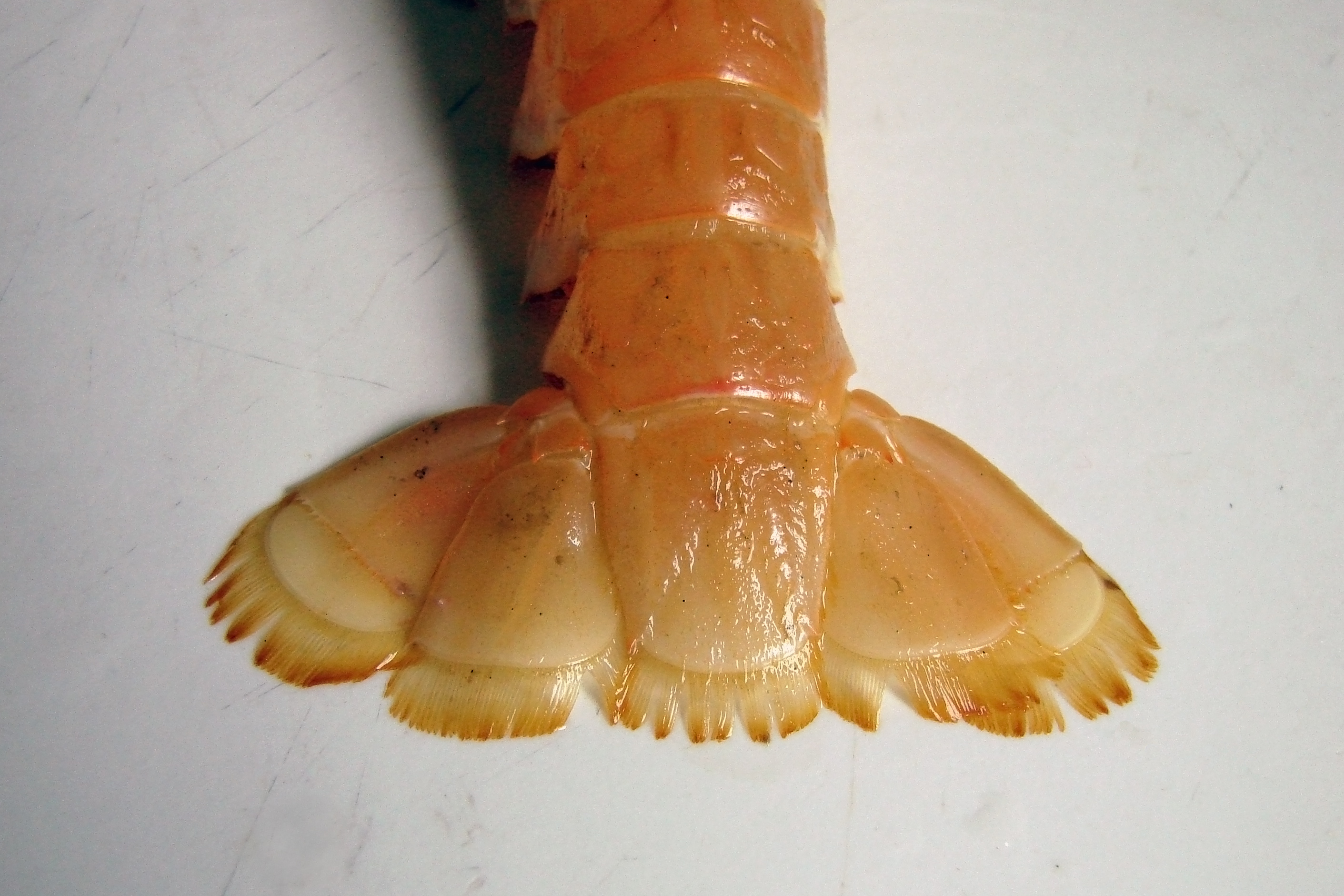
The tail of Nephrops norvegicus – the uropods flank the telson; a diaeresis is visible on the exopod (outer part) of each uropod.

Uropods are posterior appendages found on a wide variety of crustaceans. They typically have functions in locomotion.

== Definition ==
Uropods are often defined as the appendages of the last body segment of a crustacean. An alternative definition suggested by Frederick R. Schram restricts the term to those structures arising from the segment before the anal segment (the segment which carries the anus). Under this latter definition, the appendages of the anal segment are caudal rami, which are analogous to uropods.

== Form ==
Uropods are typically biramous – comprising an endopod and an exopod. The exopod is typically the larger, and may be divided in two by a transverse suture known as the diaeresis. The uropods may work in concert with the telson to form a "tail fan".
