= Frederick Schram =

American paleontologist

Frederick Robert Schram
- Born: August 11, 1943 (age 83); Chicago, Illinois, U.S.
- Scientific career
- Fields: Palaeontology; Carcinology
- Workplaces: Universiteit van Amsterdam; Journal of Crustacean Biology

Frederick Robert Schram (born August 11, 1943) is an American palaeontologist and carcinologist. He received his B.S. in biology from Loyola University Chicago in 1965, and a Ph.D. in palaeozoology from the University of Chicago in 1968.

He has written over 200 papers on various aspects of crustacean biology, taxonomy and systematics, as well as several books, including the standard text Crustacea. In 1983, he founded the journal Crustacean Issues, which he continued to edit for over twenty years. Much of his career has been spent at the Universiteit van Amsterdam, the Netherlands, from which he retired in 2005. In July 2005, he became the Editor of the Journal of Crustacean Biology.
