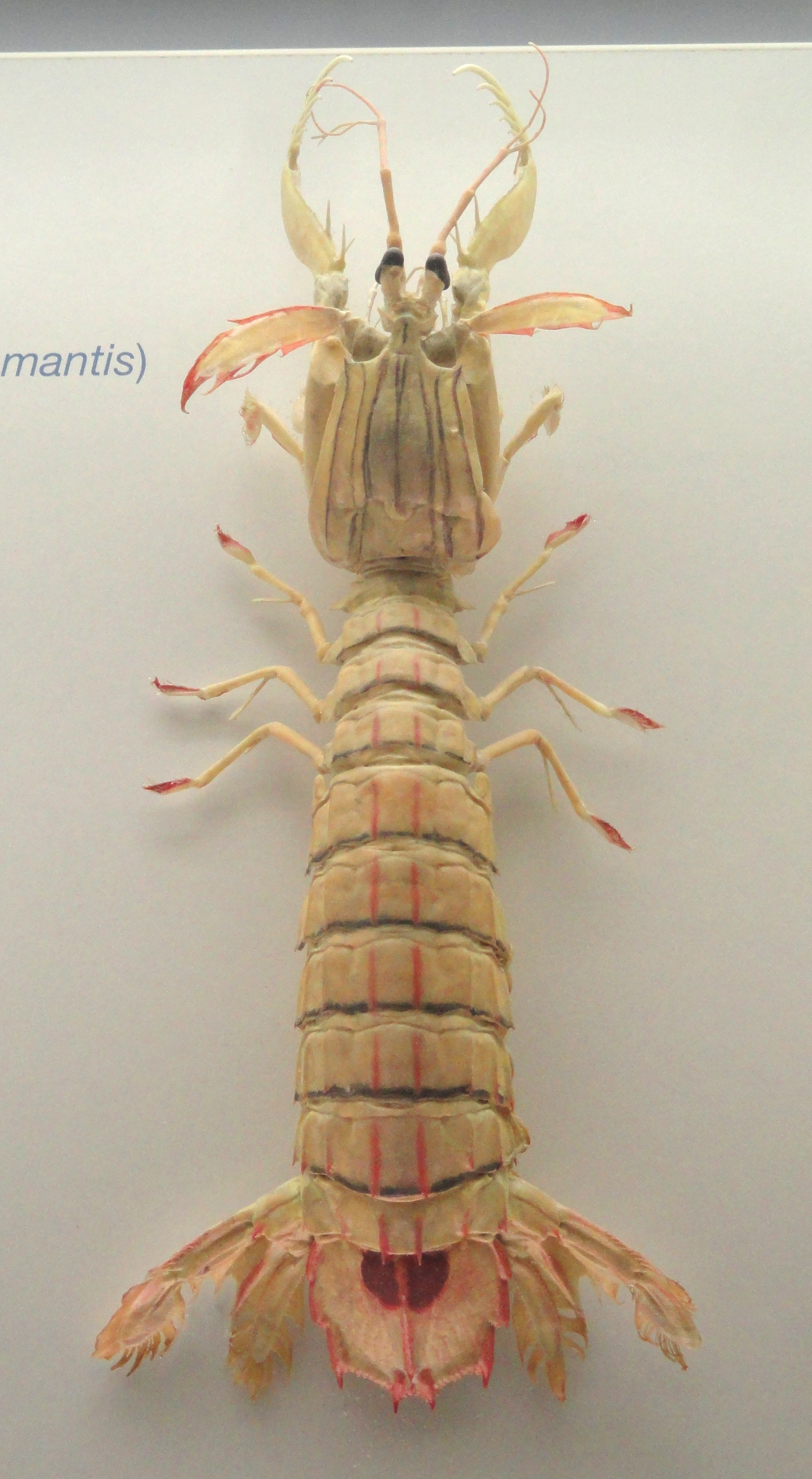
- Squilla mantis

Scientific classification
- Kingdom: Animalia
- Phylum: Arthropoda
- Clade: Pancrustacea
- Class: Malacostraca
- Order: Stomatopoda
- Family: Squillidae
- Genus: Squilla
- Species: S. mantis

Binomial name
- Squilla mantis (Linnaeus, 1758)

Synonyms
- Cancer mantis Linnaeus, 1758

= Squilla mantis =

Species of crustacean

Squilla mantis, also called the spot-tail mantis shrimp, is a species of mantis shrimp found in shallow coastal areas of the Mediterranean Sea and the Eastern Atlantic Ocean. It is also known as "pacchero" or "canocchia". Its abundance has led to it being the only commercially fished mantis shrimp in the Mediterranean.

== Description ==
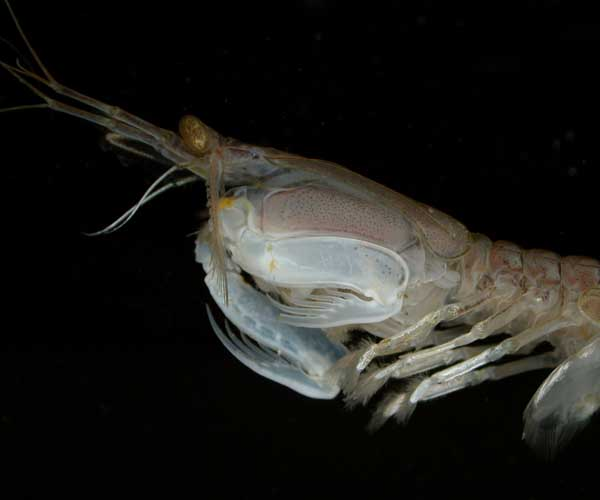
Front half of S. mantis, showing the (pale-coloured) spearing raptorial claws

Individuals grow up to 200 millimetres (8 in) long. This species is of the spearer type, distinguished by having forelimbs formed into spiked, elongated "spears" used to capture soft-bodied prey. It is generally dull brown in colouration, but has two brown eye spots, circled in white, at the base of the telson. Other species – including smashers – are also sold in the aquarium trade as Squilla mantis.

== Distribution and habitat ==
It is found around the entire coast of the Mediterranean, and in the Atlantic Ocean south from the Gulf of Cádiz to Angola, as well as around the Canary Islands, and Madeira. It has historically been recorded from Galicia, the Bay of Biscay, and the British Isles, but is not known to occur there any more.

It is particularly abundant on sandy and muddy bottoms where there is significant run-off from rivers, and where the substrate is suitable for burrowing. In the Mediterranean, the outflows from the Nile, Po, Ebro and Rhône provide these conditions. Spot-tail mantis shrimp are typically encountered to depths of 150 metres (490 ft), with their highest densities commonly occurring in the 50–60 metres (160–200 ft) range. Sporadic presence occurs in deeper waters to a maximum recorded depth of 367 metres (1,204 ft).

== Ecology ==
S. mantis digs burrows in muddy and sandy bottoms near coastlines. It remains in its burrow during the day and comes out at night to hunt, and in the winter to mate. Their feeding activity is strongly linked to the night, and captive specimens tend to refuse food during the day. Adults are strongly sedentary.

The alpheid shrimp Athanas amazone often lives in the burrows of S. mantis, despite being of a similar size to other shrimp which S. mantis feeds on. The relationship between the two species remains unknown, although a second similar case has been reported for the species Athanas squillophilus in the burrows of Oratosquilla oratoria in Japanese waters.

Spot-tail mantis shrimp are opportunistic predators and scavengers that feed on a variety of food sources determined by local availability. Common food items include other crustaceans such as crabs and decapods, mollusks such as bivalves and squid, polychaetes, and benthic fishes, alongside algae and other prey. The species has been observed following fishing boats to feed on dead animals. S. mantis also display cannibalistic tendencies and have been recorded with remnants of conspecifics in their digestive tracts. Mantis shrimp have also been recorded feeding on the egg masses of common cuttlefish.

=== Reproduction and life cycle ===
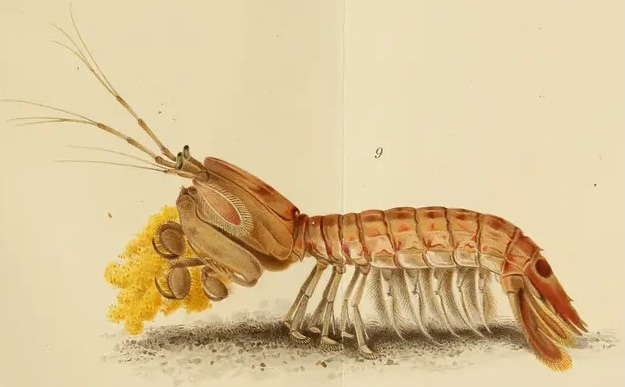
Illustration of female S. mantis carrying egg mass on front legs

The reproductive season of S. mantis occurs over winter and spring; gonad maturity tends to peak in April in the Ligurian Sea, while in the Adriatic Sea it tends to peak between February and March. After laying, the females attach their eggs to their anterior legs using a sticky secretion produced from cement glands in their sternums. They afterwards spend spring and early summer incubating them, and do not leave their burrows or feed during this period. The eggs hatch between late spring and late summer. The larvae, termed alima, are planktonic and remain in the water column over summer and early autumn; larval numbers are highest in August, but some remain present as late as November. After passing through ten aquatic molts, the larvae settle on the sea bottom and grow to adult size over the remainder of the year; female shrimp typically spawn within their second year. While some specimens appear to grow into a third year of life, most S. mantis only spawn once.

== Fishery ==
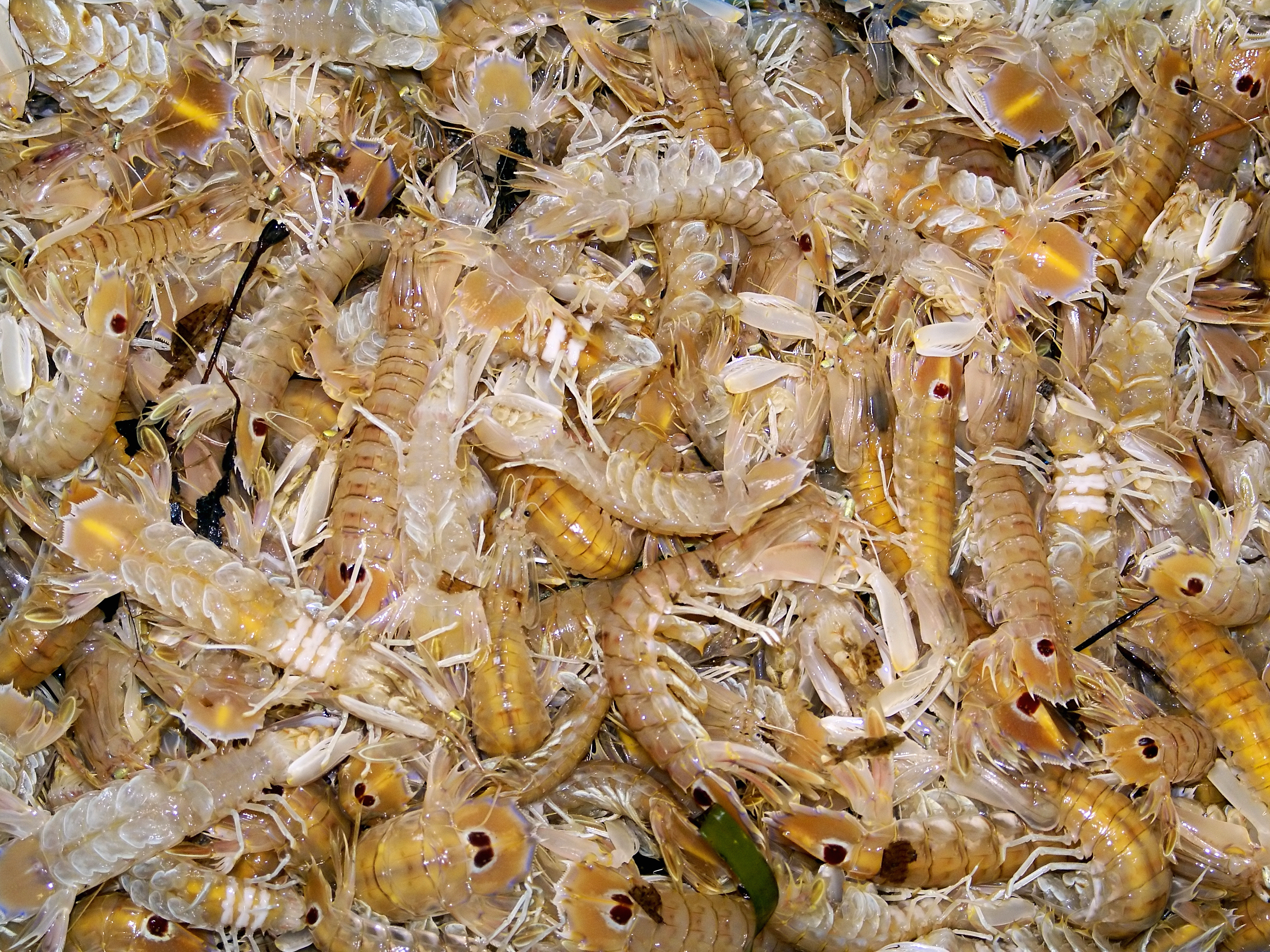
Squilla mantis for sale at a Catalan market

S. mantis is the only native stomatopod to be fished for on a commercial scale in the Mediterranean. Over 7,000 t is caught annually, 85% of which is caught on Italian shores of the Adriatic Sea. Spain is an important secondary center of catch, while smaller fisheries exist in France, Israel, and Egypt. In Catalonia, the majority of the catch occurs around the Ebro river delta, which hosts the densest local populations. It is referred to locally as "galera". Outside of the Mediterranean, it is consumed in Andalusia in the Gulf of Cadiz.

Spot-tail mantis shrimp are typically caught as a valued by-catch in multi-species trawling focused on other catches such as sole and bivalves. Dedicated fishing of the species typically employs trammel nets and gillnets. Catches are generally highest in the winter, when adults are mating, and lowest in spring and early summer, when females do not leave their burrows. Due to consisting chiefly of bycatch, the fishery of the species is not specifically regulated.
