= Australiensis =

Australiensis – Australian in Latin – may refer to:

== Species disambiguation pages ==
- A. australiensis (disambiguation)
- L. australiensis (disambiguation)
- M. australiensis (disambiguation)
- O. australiensis (disambiguation)
- P. australiensis (disambiguation)
- S. australiensis (disambiguation)
- T. australiensis (disambiguation)

== Other species ==
- Hemisquilla australiensis, a species of mantis shrimp
