= Empusa (disambiguation) =

Empusa may refer to:

- In ancient Greek mythology, the Empusa (or Empousa) was a female supernatural monster or demoness
- Empusa, a 2010 movie co-starring Paul Naschy, made in Spain
- Empusa (mantis), a genus of mantises in the family Empusidae
- Empusa (moth), a synonym of the moth genus Cucullia in the family Noctuidae
- Empusa (plant), a genus of plants in the family Orchidaceae
- Empusa muscae, a synonym for Entomophthora muscae, a fungal parasite of flies

== See also ==
- Squilla empusa, a species of mantis shrimp
