= Alachosquilla vicina =

- Alachosquilla vicina.

Scientific classification
- Kingdom: Animalia
- Phylum: Arthropoda
- Clade: Pancrustacea
- Class: Malacostraca
- Order: Stomatopoda
- Family: Nannosquillidae
- Genus: Alachosquilla
- Species: A. vicina

Binomial name
- Alachosquilla vicina (Nobili, 1904)

Species of crustacean

Alachosquilla vicina is a small species of small, specialized stomatopod crustacean commonly known as the spearing mantis shrimp. Unlike the more widely known "smashers" that use calcified clubs to break the shells of their prey, A. vicina is a member of the "spearer" group, that uses multi-toothed, needle-like appendages to impale soft-bodied prey. The species, and other stomatopod crustaceans, have gained significant attention in the field of comparative biomechanics due to its use of high-speed, spring-actuated strikes, originally thought only to be present in smashers.

== Taxonomic history ==
The species was originally described in 1904 by biologist Giuseppe (Henri) Nobili, who found this species of specimen off the coast of modern-day Djibouti in the Red Sea. Nobili originally placed the species in the genus Lysiosquilla, relating it to the known species L. tigrina. The classification remained until late 20th-century revisions of the order Stomatopoda. Later, biologists Marilyn Schotte and Raymond Manning refined the taxonomy of the species, creating a new genus called Alachosquilla to accommodate this and several related small-bodied species. This taxonomic shift was necessitated by the discovery that A. vicina and its relatives possessed a unique configuration of the telson and uropods that deviated from the broader Lysiosquilla genus. Additionally, the genus Alachosquilla is characterized by a lack of mandibular palp and a specific arrangement of five or more teeth on the dactylus of the raptorial claw.

== Range and habitat ==
This species is native to tropical marine regions in the Red Sea, the Gulf of Aden, and the Philippines. They have also been documented extensively around Lizard Island off the coast of Australia, which serves as a primary site for biomechanical field research.

A. vicina is an obligate burrower that lives in U-shaped sand burrows in both intertidal and shallow sublittoral regions. These structures are highly engineered, constructed with walls about 2 cm thick and an interior diameter of 1-1.5 cm. These burrows provide an excellent anchor point for their ambush hunting strategy, allowing the shrimp to remain concealed while monitoring the water column for passing prey. The maintenance of these burrows is a constant energetic requirement, as shifting tides and sediment movement can easily obstruct the dual entrances of the U-shaped tube.

== Morphology ==
The bodies in species in the family Nannosquilidae appear subcylindrical and depressed (dorsoventrally flattened), an adaptation for navigating narrow burrow tunnels. A. vicina exhibits sexual dimorphism, with males measuring at about 13–27 mm long, while females measure at about 27–28 mm long.

Their most prominent feature is the raptorial claw, which is the claw they hunt with. In A. vicina, the dactylus (terminal segment) has 9-11 sharp, back-curved teeth serrating its edge, designed to snag and hold slippery prey like a harpoon. The arrangement of the teeth on the dactylus is specifically adapted for "slip-resistance", ensuring that even the most muscular larval fish cannot escape once the spear has penetrated. This species is distinguished by other Nannosquillids based on the absence of a spine on the ventral side of their raptorial claws. Visually, the species exhibits a cryptic eggshell white coloration with distinct brown spots along its back to provide camouflage against sandy substrates.

== Biomechanics ==
The study of A. vicina has challenged long-standing assumptions about the evolution of power amplification in Stomatopods. While larger spearers often rely on rapid muscle contraction, the small size of A. vicina necessitates a more specialized mechanical solution to capture evasive prey.

=== Strike power ===
In biomechanics, there is a trade-off between speed and force, known as the force-velocity relationship of muscle. Because a muscle can only contract at a finite speed, it cannot generate the explosive accelerations required for "bullet-like" strikes though direct muscle contraction alone. Alachsquilla vicina resolves this paradox to generate extremely rapid strikes using power amplification.

The strike is categorized as a latch-mediated spring actuation (LaMSA) system. The process begins with the elastic loading of the appendage, where large extensor muscles slowly contract to deform the exoskeleton. This slow contraction stores potential energy, which is then released in a millisecond-scale burst. The energy is governed by a latch mechanism held in place by flexor muscles. These flexor muscles take up only 6% of the muscle mass in the merus, while the remaining 94% is dedicated to the spring-loading extensor muscle. This extreme specialization allows A. vicina to bypass the intrinsic limitations of biological muscle, achieving mass-specific power outputs that would be physically impossible through aerobic or anaerobic cellular respiration alone.

=== Elastic energy storage structures ===
Elastic energy is stored in two specialized exoskeletal portions of the front appendage:

- The meral-V: A spring-like structure analogous to the elbow of the human arm
- The saddle: A compressively loaded structure on the dorsal portion of the merus

The merus functions as the primary housing for this energy, acting similarly to the humerus portion of the human arm. When the shrimp is prepared to strike, the muscular latches are released and the elastic energy is delivered through the recoil of the meral-V and the saddle, propelling the dactyl and propodus toward its prey. The resulting strike force is thousands of times the body weight of the shrimp. Research indicates that this elastic form of striking yields much faster speeds than the non-elastic strikes found in other mantis shrimp with similar appendage morphology.

Recent studies have utilized micro-computed tomography (micro-CT) to reveal that the "saddle" in A. vicina is composed of highly mineralized cuticle that acts as a stiff spring. This structure must withstand repeated loading cycles without fracturing, suggesting that the material properties of the Alachosquilla exoskeleton have evolved high fatigue resistance to support thousands of predatory strikes over the animal’s lifespan.

=== Kinematics and control ===
The strike velocity of A. vicina has been recorded at a mean of 5.7 m/s. While this is slower than the most extreme smashing mantis shrimp, it is highly optimized for the escape speeds of its primary prey, such as larval fish and small caridean shrimp.

A significant drawback of these rapid movements is that the speed of the strike is faster than the speed at which neural signals travel. This means that once the latch is released, the shrimp cannot adjust the trajectory of the claw. Therefore, the predatory strategy must occur entirely before the movement. The system is a form of open-loop control, where the "program" for the strike is set before the execution and cannot be corrected mid-flight.

=== Fluid dynamics and drag ===
The aquatic environment poses a major challenge to high-speed movement to the effect of drag. In fluid dynamics, drag increases exponentially with velocity. Research shows that the size of the species and the speed of the strike are the primary determinants of drag.

Appendage morphology has a minimal impact on drag. Smashers and spearers of similar size and speed produce similar amounts of drag during their strikes. This indicates that the divergent evolution of spearing and smashing appendages can be mostly attributed to predatory function (impaling vs. crushing) and not as an adaptation to reduce drag forces.

=== Absence of cavitation ===
One of the most distinct biomechanical differences between A. vicina and larger smasher species is the lack of cavitation during the strike. Many smashing mantis shrimp create cavitation bubbles, which are vapor-filled voids caused by extreme pressure drops due to the speed of their strikes. The collapse of these bubbles produces a secondary shockwave that can stun prey.

However, because of the slender, streamlined dactyl morphology of A. vicina and its relatively lower peak velocity compared to large smashers, cavitation bubbles are not produced. This lack of cavitation may be an advantage for an ambush predator, as it prevents the loud "snap" and potential damage to their sandy burrow that a cavitation bubble collapsing would cause.

=== Allometry and scaling ===
A. vicina is an interesting case in the field of allometry, the study of how biological processes scale with body size. Research comparing A. vicina, which is about 25 mm, to the much larger spearer Lysiosqillina maculata, which can exceed 300 mm, has revealed a scaling dilemma. While larger spearers can move their limbs through a greater distance, they often lack the mass-specific muscular power of the smaller Alachosquilla.

== Ecology and behavior ==
A. vicina is an ambush predator. It sits at the mouth of its burrow, utilizing its complex eyes to track movement in the surrounding water. While spearing mantis shrimp are generally thought to primarily feed on fish, they also eat a diverse array of prey. The presence of high-power spring mechanisms in a species that eats "soft" prey indicates that the evolution of their spearing appendage was not solely to break hard shells but may have other uses related to the speed of the strike itself. Despite their distinctly complex eyesight, there has been little research done into the direct line between the striking behavior and their eyesight, specifically in this species.

The eyes of A. vicina, which feature a specialized "midband" of six rows of ommatidia, are capable of detecting circular and linear polarized light, as well as multispectral color. This advanced visual system allows them to see through the camouflage of transparent caridean shrimp, which are a major component of their diet.
