= Hemisquilla californiensis =

Scientific classification
- Kingdom: Animalia
- Phylum: Arthropoda
- Class: Malacostraca
- Order: Stomatopoda
- Family: Hemisquillidae
- Genus: Hemisquilla
- Species: H. californiensis

Binomial name
- Hemisquilla californiensis Stephenson, 1967

Synonyms
- Hemisquilla ensigera californiensis Stephenson, 1967

Species of mantis shrimp

Hemisquilla californiensis is a species of mantis shrimp native to the northern Pacific Ocean. H. californiensis is known for smashing prey against rocks using its raptorial claws, as well as its brightly colored telson and eyespots under the tail. H. californiensis is one of the largest and most common mantis shrimp species in California. H. californiensis is one of three subspecies of H. ensigera.

== Etymology ==
The genus name Hemisquilla comes from Ancient Greek ἡμι- (hēmi-), meaning 'half', and Latin squilla, meaning 'a kind of shrimp'. The specific epithet californiensis comes from the word California, and -ensis, meaning 'from a place'.

== Habitat ==
Hemisquilla californiensis is found off the warm water coasts of Southern California, Baja California, as well as mainland Mexico. In Southern California it inhabits the islands of Santa Cruz, Anacapa, Santa Catalina and San Clemente. It prefers environments with organic, nutrient-rich silty sand sediment. The California Department of Fish and Game states populations are often caught during rod and line fishing as well as by skin divers.

== Body ==
H. californiensis has long folding forelimbs (dactyls) that are used to incapacitate prey. Mantis shrimps are divided into two groups: smashers and spearers, depending on the method of catching prey. Spearers pierce their prey with their dactyls. Smashers use the heel of the dactyl as a hammer to smash open hard-shell organisms, such as clams, crabs, and snails. H. californiensis is classified as a smasher, using its raptorial claws to smash open its prey against rocks and then eat the organisms soft body inside.

The telson of H. californiensis and is brightly colored and ornamented. Underneath the tail there are two bright eyespots, which are flashed at predators as a defense mechanism; surprising the attackers and sending them away. The supportive ridges of the telson can provide a structural advantage during territorial fights between smashers.

H. californiensis can grow up to 10 inches in length. The carapace sheds periodically throughout development, leaving the species vulnerable after molting while the shell is still soft.

== Behaviour ==
Low-frequency sounds ("rumbles") emitted by H. californiensis are spectrally similar to the sounds produced by African and Asian elephants, in a range of 20–60 Hz with a strong secondary harmonic frequency. The species appears to produce this rumble by contracting a posterior muscle connected to a stiff extension of the carapace. The sides of the carapace are covered in large red polarized spots which vibrate during the rumble, suggesting that the sound may generate both vibrational and visual signals. It may be used to interact with predators and burrow intruders as a defensive or territorial measure.

It has been suggested that constant and overlapping noise from boats and other anthropogenic sources may threaten the effectiveness of this type of signaling, however little is known about the exact function and to which degree it is impacted by such disturbances.

Like all mantis shrimps, Hemisquilla species have compound eyes divided into two peripheral retinal regions (dorsal and ventral hemispheres) and one mid-band region. A behavioral study of H. californiensis found that animals studied responded to moving targets under white, blue, and green light, but were less sensitive to red light and had no measurable response to infrared light. Overall, the animals studied responded to targets rotating horizontally across their field of vision with a quick startle response noticeable in their eyes/antennules, but there was no tracking of targets with their eyes. It was therefore concluded that H. californiensis uses monochromatic vision in its peripheral hemispheres to recognize objects, and the mid-band's sharper color receptors, if light conditions allow, add supplemental information to create a more detailed picture.

== In captivity ==
In captivity H. californiensis has the strength to smash the glass of an aquarium using its powerful forelimbs, the same mechanism used to smash prey. The diet of captive H. californiensis consists of shrimp, clams, and worms. Mantis shrimp are known to cause severe cuts when handled.

== Relation to other subspecies of H. ensigera. ==
There are three subspecies of H. ensigera: the Chilean subspecies H. ensigera ensigera, the Californian subspecies H. ensigera californiensis, and the Australasian subspecies H. ensigera australiensis. In A Comparison of Australasian and American Specimens of Hemisquilla ensigera, by Stephenson, published in 1967, specimens from the Chilean, Californian, and Australian populations of H. ensigera were compared. The California specimens were from the Hancock Foundation, the Australian specimens were from museums including the Australian Museum, Sydney, and the Chilean specimens were from the Smithsonian Institution. There were statistically distinct morphological distinctions between the populations, including the number of segments of mandibular palp, the number of intermediate lobes on the telson, the relative lengths of rostra, and the relative breadth of cornea. In comparing the American and Australian specimens, the Australian had a broader cornea and the American had a longer rostra. Australian specimens had two-segmented mandibular palps, Chilean specimens had one to three-segmented mandibular palps, and the California specimens had three-segmented on the right and two-segmented the left mandibular palps. Of the intermediate lobes of the telson, the Australian had two lobes on each side while Chilean and Californian specimens had one on each side. These differences were found to be statistically significant and were the basis for Stephenson defining these populations as three subspecies of H. ensigera.
