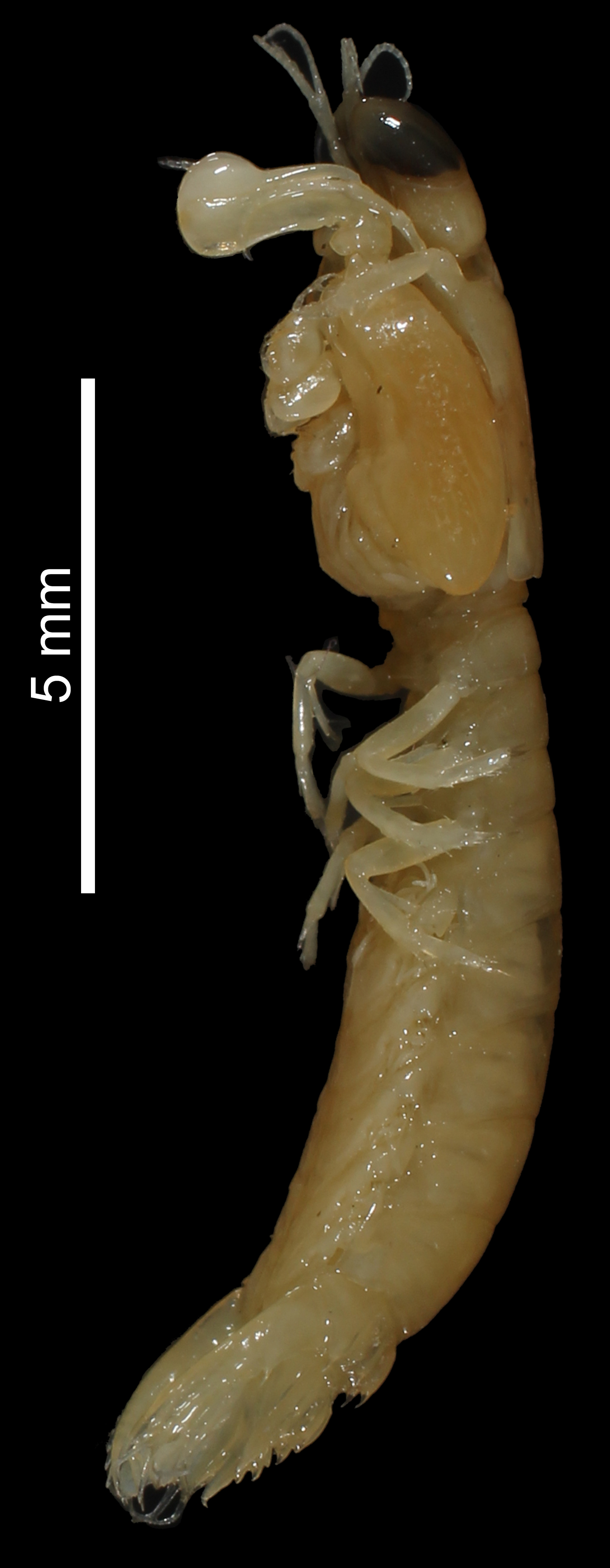
- Gonodactylellus crosnieri

Scientific classification
- Domain: Eukaryota
- Kingdom: Animalia
- Phylum: Arthropoda
- Class: Malacostraca
- Order: Stomatopoda
- Family: Gonodactylidae
- Genus: Gonodactylellus; Manning, 1995

= Gonodactylellus =

Genus of crustaceans

Gonodactylellus is a genus of mantis shrimp. The genus was first described by Raymond Manning in 1995.

It contains the following species:

- Gonodactylellus affinis (de Man, 1902)
- Gonodactylellus annularis Erdman & Manning, 1998
- Gonodactylellus barberi Ahyong & Erdmann, 2007
- Gonodactylellus bicarinatus (Manning, 1968)
- Gonodactylellus caldwelli Erdman & Manning, 1998
- Gonodactylellus choprai (Manning, 1967)
- Gonodactylellus crosnieri (Manning, 1968)
- Gonodactylellus demanii (Henderson, 1893)
- Gonodactylellus dianae Ahyong, 2008
- Gonodactylellus erdmanni Ahyong, 2001
- Gonodactylellus espinosus (Borradaile, 1898)
- Gonodactylellus incipiens (Lanchester, 1903)
- Gonodactylellus kandi Ahyong & Erdmann, 2007
- Gonodactylellus kume Ahyong, 2012
- Gonodactylellus lanchesteri (Manning, 1967)
- Gonodactylellus micronesicus (Manning, 1971)
- Gonodactylellus molyneux Ahyong, 2001
- Gonodactylellus oshea Ahyong, 2012
- Gonodactylellus rubriguttatus Erdman & Manning, 1998
- Gonodactylellus snidvongsi (Naiyanetr, 1987)
- Gonodactylellus spinosus (Bigelow, 1893)
- Gonodactylellus viridis (Serène, 1954)
