= Hemisquilla ensigera =

Scientific classification
- Kingdom: Animalia
- Phylum: Arthropoda
- Class: Malacostraca
- Order: Stomatopoda
- Family: Hemisquillidae
- Genus: Hemisquilla
- Species: H. ensigera

Binomial name
- Hemisquilla ensigera (Owen, 1832)

Synonyms
- Gonodactylus ensiger Owen, 1832; Gonodactylus styliferus H. Milne Edwards, 1837

Species of mantis shrimp

Hemisquilla ensigera is a species of mantis shrimp. Two formerly recognized subspecies are now considered to be separate species (H. californiensis, H. australiensis).

== Etymology ==
The genus name Hemisquilla comes from Ancient Greek ἡμι- (hēmi-), meaning 'half', and Latin squilla, meaning 'a kind of shrimp'. The specific epithet ensigera comes from ensis, meaning 'sword', and -ger, meaning 'bearing'.

== Ecology ==
The species is a near complete "oxyconformer" in that its aerobic metabolism is significantly depressed and impacted at low oxygen levels.
