= Coronididae =

Scientific classification
- Domain: Eukaryota
- Kingdom: Animalia
- Phylum: Arthropoda
- Class: Malacostraca
- Order: Stomatopoda
- Family: Coronididae; Manning, 1980

Family of crustaceans

Coronididae is a family of crustaceans belonging to the order Stomatopoda.

Genera:

- Acoridon Adkison, Heard & Hopkins, 1983
- Coronida Brooks, 1886
- Mortensenenus Manning, 1990
- Neocoronida Manning, 1976
- Paracoridon Moosa, 1991
