= Hemisquilla braziliensis =

Scientific classification
- Kingdom: Animalia
- Phylum: Arthropoda
- Class: Malacostraca
- Order: Stomatopoda
- Family: Hemisquillidae
- Genus: Hemisquilla
- Species: H. braziliensis

Binomial name
- Hemisquilla braziliensis (Moreira, 1903)

Synonyms
- Pseudosquilla braziliensis Moreira, 1903

Species of mantis shrimp

Hemisquilla braziliensis is a species of mantis shrimp native to South America.

== Conservation ==
H. braziliensis is currently facing pressure in the South Atlantic due to bycatch and exploitation. Off the coast of the Brazilian states of São Paulo and Rio de Janeiro, commercial pink shrimp trawling is common and often leads to the bycatch and discarding of numerous species of crustaceans, including H. braziliensis. Due to its large size, the species is also directly targeted for commercial exploitation in this region.

== Etymology ==
The genus name Hemisquilla comes from Ancient Greek ἡμι- (hēmi-), meaning 'half', and Latin squilla, meaning 'a kind of shrimp'. The specific epithet braziliensis comes from Brazil, and -ensis, meaning 'from a place'.
