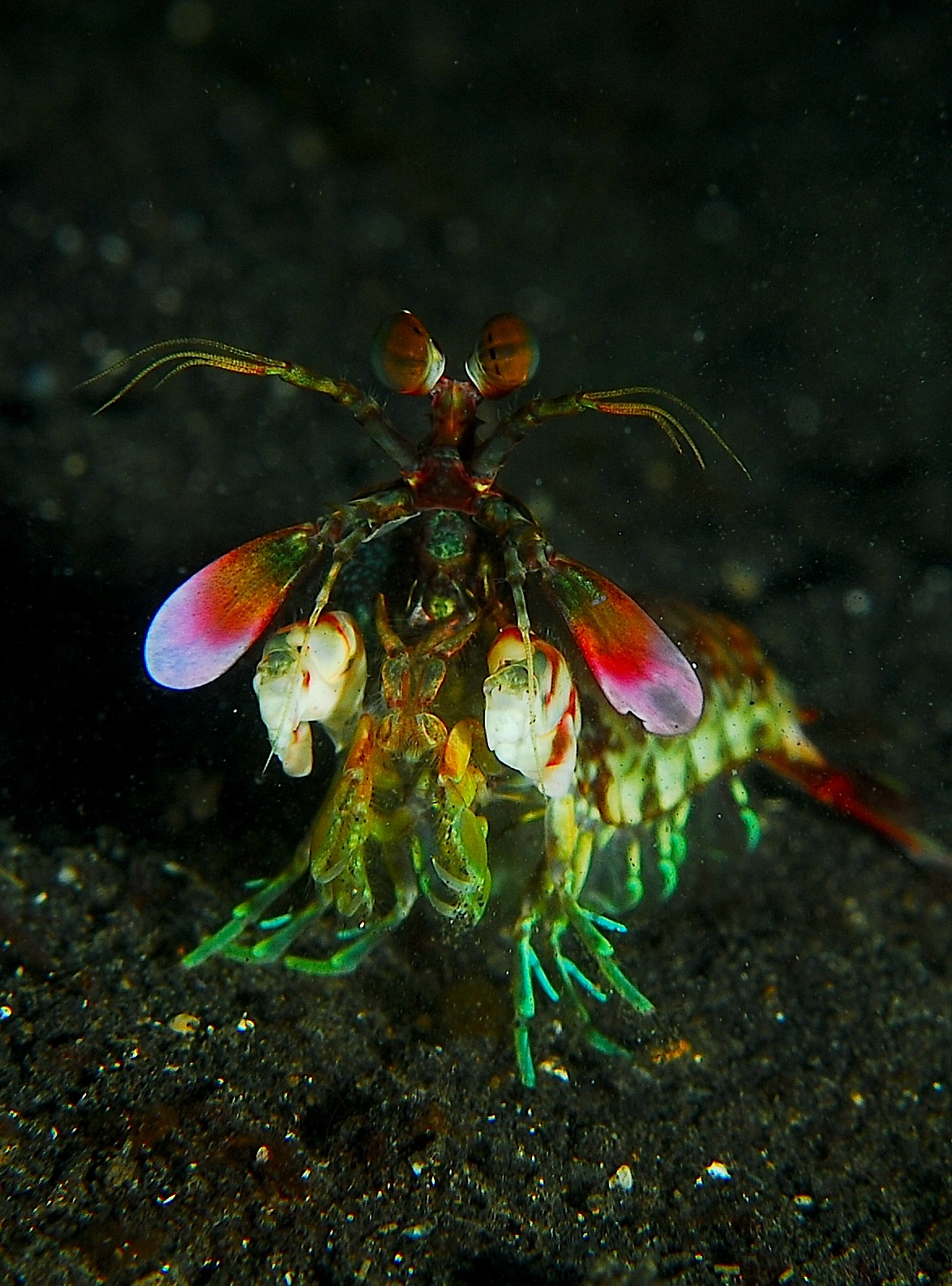
- Gonodactylus smithii

Scientific classification
- Kingdom: Animalia
- Phylum: Arthropoda
- Clade: Pancrustacea
- Class: Malacostraca
- Order: Stomatopoda
- Superfamily: Gonodactyloidea
- Family: Gonodactylidae; Giesbrecht, 1910

= Gonodactylidae =

Family of crustaceans

Gonodactylidae is a family of mantis shrimp. It contains these genera:

- Gonodactylaceus Manning, 1995
- Gonodactylellus Manning, 1995
- Gonodactyloideus Manning, 1984
- Gonodactylolus Manning, 1970
- Gonodactylopsis Manning, 1969
- Gonodactylus Berthold, 1827
- Hoplosquilla Holthuis, 1964
- Hoplosquilloides Manning, 1978c
- Neogonodactylus Manning, 1995
