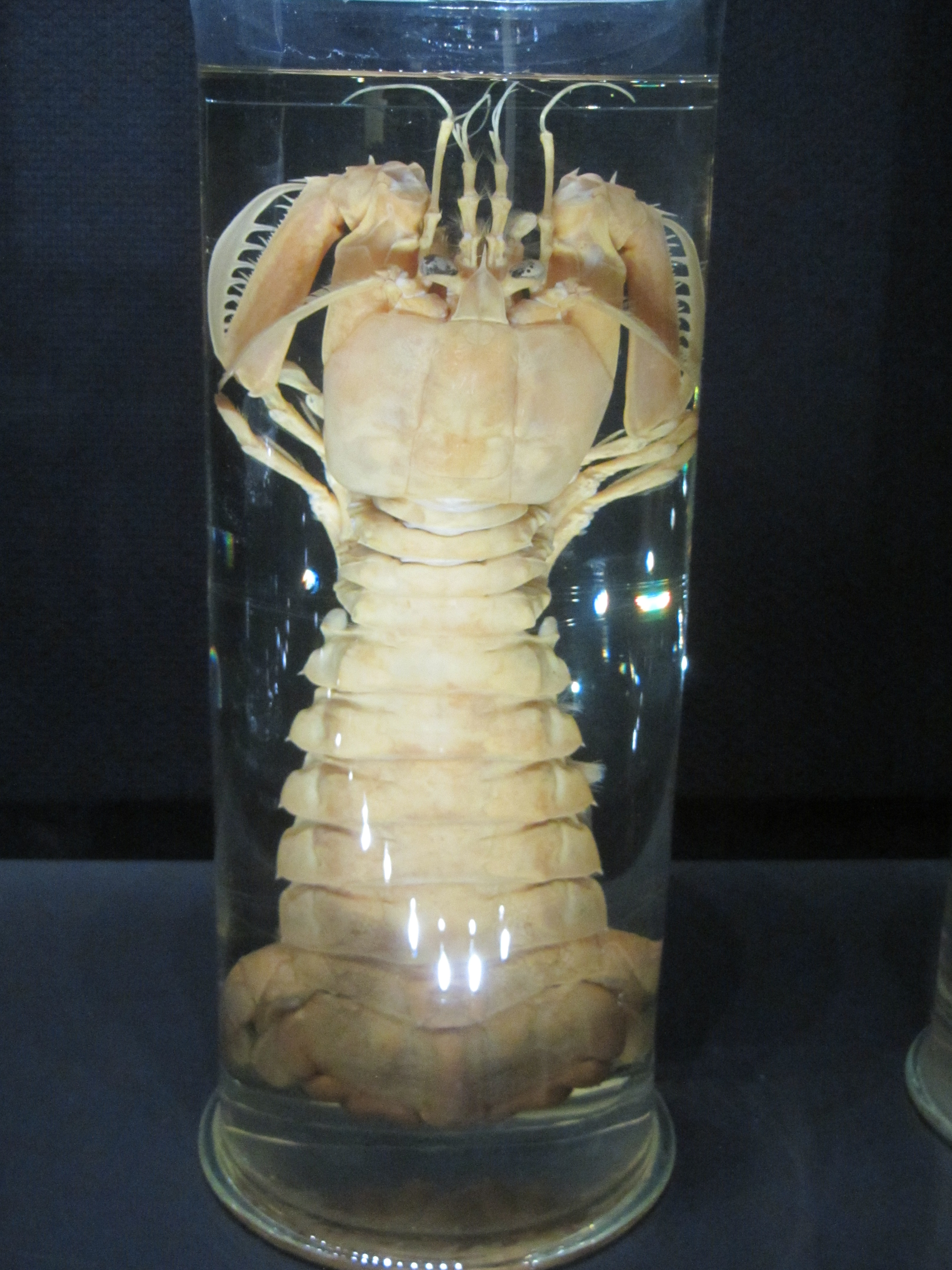
- Bathysquilla crassispinosa

Scientific classification
- Kingdom: Animalia
- Phylum: Arthropoda
- Clade: Pancrustacea
- Class: Malacostraca
- Order: Stomatopoda
- Superfamily: Bathysquilloidea
- Family: Bathysquillidae; Manning, 1967

= Bathysquillidae =

Bathysquillid

Family of crustaceans

Bathysquillidae is a family of mantis shrimp. It contains two genera and three species. The family was described by Raymond Manning in 1967.

== Characteristics ==
Mantis shrimps in this family can be distinguished by the fact that the dorsal surface is rough and covered in tubercles, the exopod (outer branch) of the uropod (fan-like sixth abdominal segment appendage) is fully articulated and the telson (terminal segment) is wider than it is long. The fifth abdominal segment bears no posteriorly directed median spine.

== Genera and species ==
According to the World Register of Marine Species, the family includes the following genera and species:

- Genus Altosquilla Bruce, 1985
  - Altosquilla soelae Bruce, 1985
- Genus Bathysquilla Manning, 1963
  - Bathysquilla crassispinosa (Fukuda, 1909)
  - Bathysquilla microps (Manning, 1961)
