= Hemisquilla =

Scientific classification
- Kingdom: Animalia
- Phylum: Arthropoda
- Clade: Pancrustacea
- Class: Malacostraca
- Order: Stomatopoda
- Family: Hemisquillidae
- Genus: Hemisquilla; Hansen, 1895

Species
- See text

Genus of crustaceans

Hemisquilla is a genus of mantis shrimp, and the only genus in the family Hemisquillidae. It contains four species distributed in Australia and the Americas. Species in the genus typically eat snails, fish, rock oysters, and smaller crustaceans like crabs. They are preyed upon by larger bony fishes and cephalopods. It is the most basal living mantis shrimp lineage, and the sister group to all other mantis shrimp.

== Species ==
Four species are recognized:

- Hemisquilla australiensis Stephenson, 1967
- Hemisquilla braziliensis (Moreira, 1903)
- Hemisquilla californiensis Stephenson, 1967
- Hemisquilla ensigera (Owen, 1832)

== Anatomy ==
Prey capture in Hemisquilla species is extremely rapid. Contact with the prey is made within 4-10 milliseconds, and the striking limb moves at a linear velocity of around 10 meters per second. There are five physiologically different motor units composed of muscle fibers that work together to make this rapid strike possible.

== Etymology ==
The genus name comes from Ancient Greek ἡμι- (hēmi-), meaning 'half', and Latin squilla, meaning 'a kind of shrimp'.
