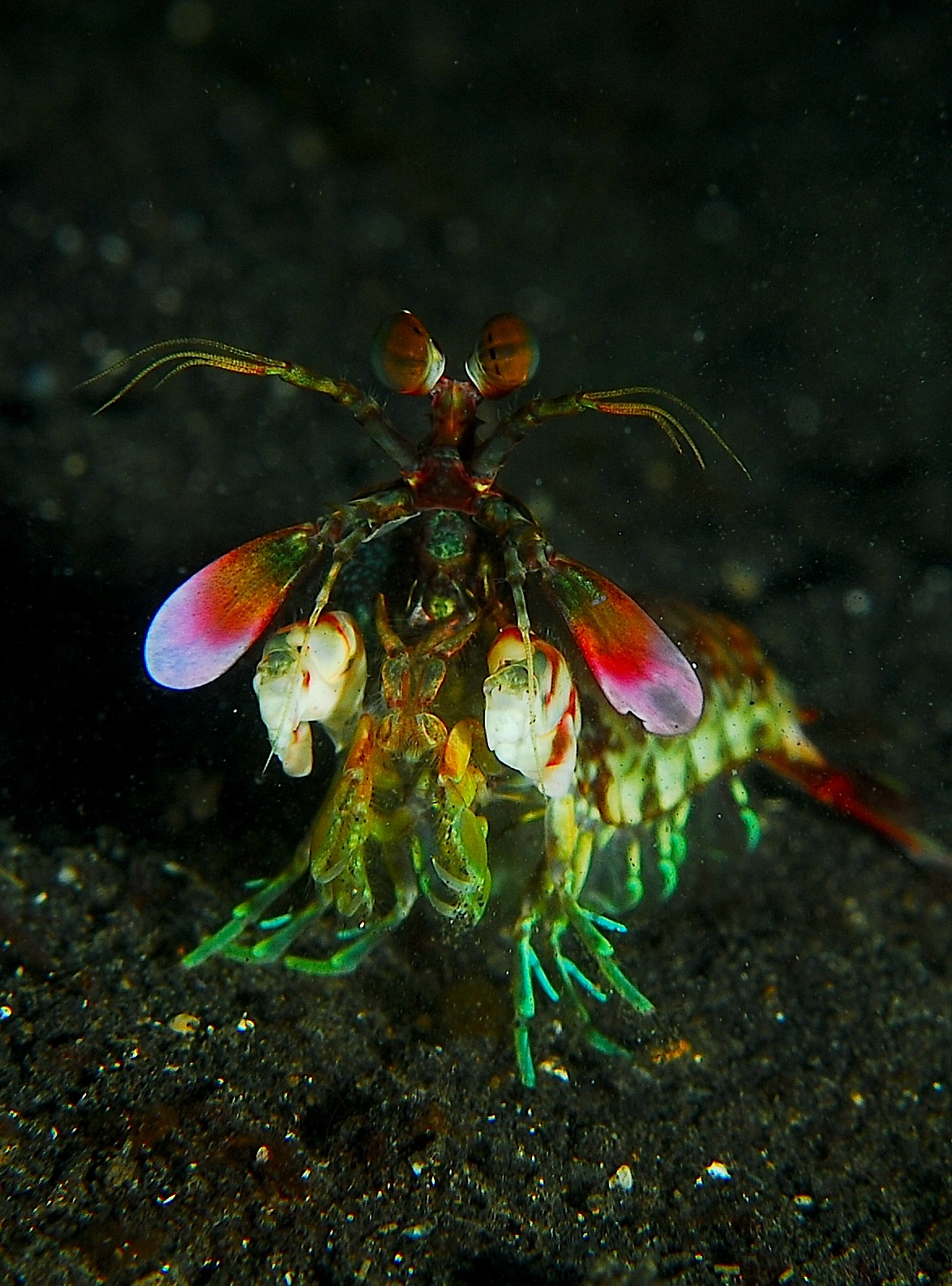

Scientific classification
- Kingdom: Animalia
- Phylum: Arthropoda
- Clade: Pancrustacea
- Class: Malacostraca
- Order: Stomatopoda
- Family: Gonodactylidae
- Genus: Gonodactylus
- Species: G. smithii

Binomial name
- Gonodactylus smithii Pocock, 1893

= Gonodactylus smithii =

Species of mantis shrimp

Gonodactylus smithii, also known as the purple spot mantis shrimp or Smith's mantis shrimp, is a species of the smasher type of mantis shrimp. G. smithii are the first animals discovered to be capable of dynamic polarization vision. They are identified by their distinctive meral spots ranging from maroon to purple with a white ring, though those that inhabit depths below 10 meters tend to be colored maroon. They also have raptorial dactyles, specialized forelimbs that are pigmented green and red, and antennal scales that are yellow.

== Background ==
Gonodactylus smithii are aggressive benthic marine predators that exhibit highly specialized color vision. On average, they are around 60 millimeters in length, but have been found to be as large as 380 millimeters. The morphology of both males and females are isometrically proportional to their respective body masses. Their mass ranges between 10 and 300 grams, with the average being around 60 grams. Their basal metabolic rate ranges from 0.0125 to 0.02 cm3.02/g/hr, with the average being around 0.0175 cm3.02/g/hr.

== Distribution ==
Gonodactylus smithii are found in tropical littoral zones in the Indo-Pacific Ocean, and widespread in Australia, India, and eastern Africa. They are also found in regions south of Japan and around Guam. Gonodactylus smithii reside in coral reef flats in both shallow waters and low intertidal depths ranging from 1 to 60 meters, but are most commonly found in the low intertidal zone. Gonodactylus smithii typically dwell in the cavities they create in either live coral or coral rubble.

== Reproduction ==
Gonodactylus smithii reproduce all year long, but breeding is more concentrated during warmer months. They are generally monogamous, though some are polygynous. Males usually pursue females in their native habitats. Initially, males, using an external copulation organ, insert gonadopods into female gonadopores. Sperm is released, with females holding the males briefly. Females then release both the males and their eggs, with fertilization occurring. Females are oviparous, laying eggs that eventually hatch. Females produce an adhesive that join the fertilized eggs together in a cluster. They also carry the egg mass with their front thoracic appendages, brooding them in their burrow. The female does not eat during this time, as their sole focus is caring for, cleaning, and aerating the eggs. Males typically leave after copulation and do not invest in the females nor their offspring.

== Life stages ==
Gonodactylus smithii have a bipartite life cycle. They begin with a larval phase, during which dispersal occurs, then mature into an adult phase. There are 7 larval stages, with the first 3 stages taking between 1 and 3 days, the fourth stage taking between 6 and 8 days, and the final 3 stages taking up to 38 days.

== Diet ==
Gonodactylus smithii utilize their smashing raptorial claws as a mechanism to catch prey. The claws can easily shatter shells, stunning the prey. Gonodactylus smithii are generally carnivorous, specifically preying on fish, molluscs, non-insect arthropods, crustaceans, bivalves, and gastropods.

== Movement ==
Gonodactylus smithii are capable of many signaling behaviors and exhibit offensive and defensive actions while doing so. Offensive actions include pushing the telson into the domicile of the resident, grasping the body of another using maxillipeds, and using dactyls to pierce through another. Defensive actions include simply avoiding, and bending the abdomen so that it brings the telson underneath and up to the front.

== Behavior ==
Gonodactylus smithii typically create sedentary burrows in bases of coral. They are solitary and sedentary outside of mating, and are extremely territorial, inflicting powerful smashing strikes on rival shrimps' telsons if their territory is encroached upon. As such, these shrimps' telsons are often the most armored part of their body. They are extremely aggressive hunters and can be active both nocturnally or diurnally.

=== Vision ===
A behavior unique to Gonodactylus smithii is that they are capable of dynamic polarization vision. Unlike other organisms, stomatopods only fixate their gaze on objects of interest from time to time. They are able to focus their eyes with a series of rotations, and their eyes are capable of moving independently of the other. One type of rotation they use is torsional rotation, in which their ability to see the polarization of light is amplified. They rotate their eyes so that certain photoreceptors are aligned with the angle of polarization of a linearly polarized visual stimulus. This allows them to isolate the contrast between the object of interest and its background. The study of the eye structure of Gonodactylus smithii can generate more information on digital and visual storage capacity. Because of this dynamic polarization vision, Gonodactylus smithii are able to detect all four Stokes parameters (S_{0}, S_{1}, S_{2}, and S_{3}). It simultaneously detects four linear and two circular polarization components, achieving high-contrast perception without confusion states or neutral points.

== Roles in ecosystem ==
Gonodactylus smithii are essential to their ecosystem as they provide habitats for other organisms. The cavities that they create are left behind for other organisms to dwell in, and some parasites, though this has led to the contracting of diseases in their shells.

== Bibliography ==
- Barber, Paul, and Boyce, Sarah L. (2006). Estimating diversity of Indo-Pacific coral reef stomatopods through DNA barcoding of stomatopod larvae. Proc. R. Soc. B.
- Cheroske, Cronin, T. W., Durham, M. F., & Caldwell, R. L. (2009). Adaptive signaling behavior in stomatopods under varying light conditions. Marine and Freshwater Behaviour and Physiology.
- Daly, I., How, M., Partridge, J. et al. (2016). Dynamic polarization vision in mantis shrimps. Nat Commun.
- Luff, J. 2019. "Gonodactylus smithii" (On-line), Animal Diversity Web.
- McHenry, Claverie, T., Rosario, M. V., & Patek, S. N. (2012). Gearing for speed slows the predatory strike of a mantis shrimp. Journal of Experimental Biology.
- Morgan, Steven G., and Goy, Joseph W. (1987). Reproduction and Larval Development of the Mantis Shrimp Gonodactylus Bredini (Crustacea: Stomatopoda) Journal of Crustacean Biology.
- Yang, Mingqui, Liu, Hongtao, Wang, Rong, & Tan, Wei (2021). The complete mitochondrial genome of Purple Spot Mantis Shrimp Gonodactylus smithii (Pocock, 1893), Mitochondrial DNA Part B.
