= Pseudopupil =

Dark spot on the compound eyes of some invertebrates

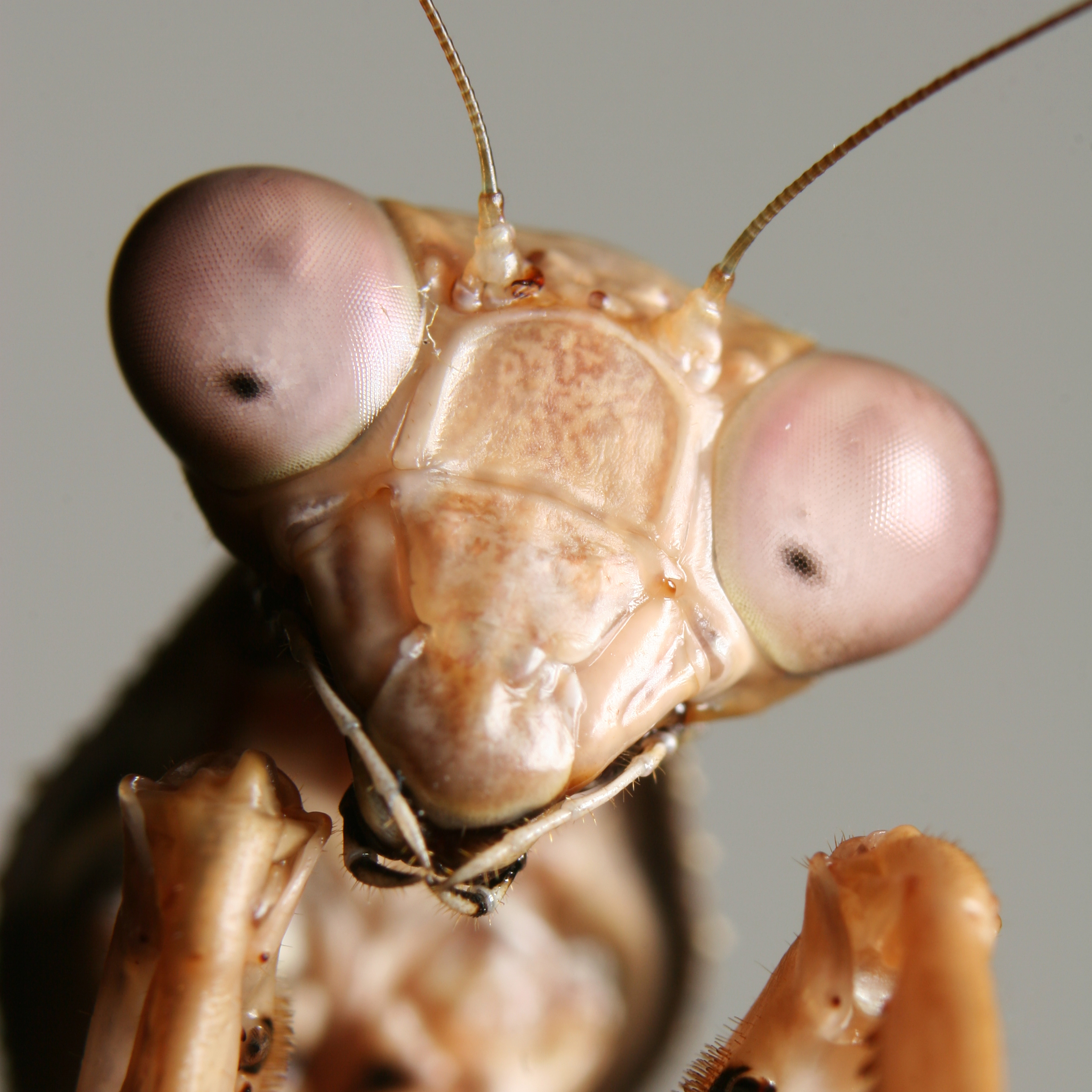
The head of a mantis (Prohierodula picta) showing the black pseudopupil in its compound eyes

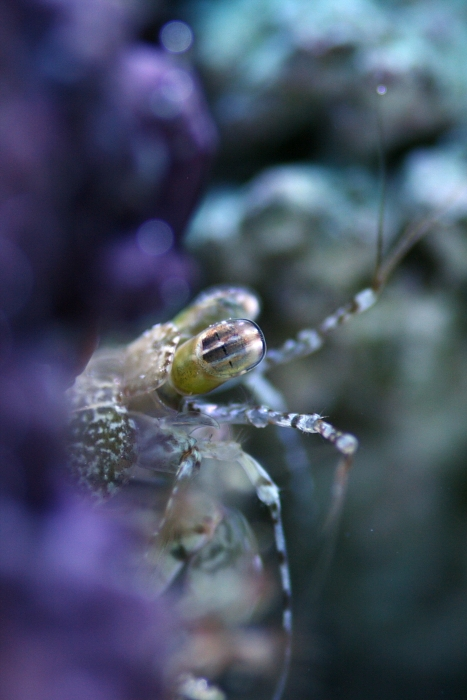
The eye of a mantis shrimp has three regions, each with its own pseudopupil.

In the compound eye of arthropods such as insects and crustaceans, the pseudopupil appears as a dark spot which moves across the eye as the animal is rotated. This occurs because the ommatidia that one observes "head-on" (along their optical axes) absorb the incident light, while those to one side reflect it. The pseudopupil therefore reveals which ommatidia are aligned with the axis along which the observer is viewing.

== Pseudopupil analysis technique ==
The pseudopupil analysis technique is used to study neurodegeneration in insects like Drosophila, where specimens are genetically engineered with transgenes to model neurodegenerative diseases such as Huntington's chorea. An adult Drosophila eye consists of nearly 800 unit ommatidia which are repeated in a symmetrical pattern. Each ommatidium contains 8 photoreceptor cells, each of which forms a rhabdomere (rhabdomeres 7 and 8 overlap vertically; therefore, only rhabdomere 7 is visible externally). Neurodegeneration leads to loss or degradation of photoreceptors. By visualizing and counting the intact rhabdomeres, degradation level can be measured. Thus, analyzing the pseudopupil can permit empirical study of neurodegeneration.
