= Indosquilla =

Scientific classification
- Domain: Eukaryota
- Kingdom: Animalia
- Phylum: Arthropoda
- Class: Malacostraca
- Order: Stomatopoda
- Family: Indosquillidae
- Genus: Indosquilla; Ingle & Merrett, 1971
- Species: I. manihinei

Binomial name
- Indosquilla manihinei Ingle & Merrett, 1971

Genus of crustaceans

Indosquilla is a monotypic genus of crustaceans belonging to the monotypic family Indosquillidae. The only species is Indosquilla manihinei.

The species is found in Indian Ocean.
