= Takuidae =

Scientific classification
- Domain: Eukaryota
- Kingdom: Animalia
- Phylum: Arthropoda
- Class: Malacostraca
- Order: Stomatopoda
- Family: Takuidae; Manning, 1995

Family of crustaceans

Takuidae is a family of crustaceans belonging to the order Stomatopoda.

Genera:

- Mesacturoides Manning, 1978
- Mesacturus Miers, 1880
- Taku Manning, 1995
