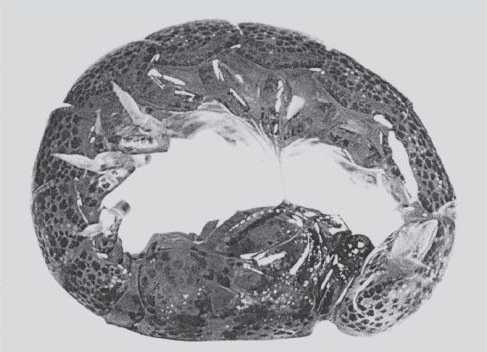

Scientific classification
- Domain: Eukaryota
- Kingdom: Animalia
- Phylum: Arthropoda
- Class: Malacostraca
- Order: Stomatopoda
- Family: Nannosquillidae
- Genus: Nannosquilla
- Species: N. decemspinosa

Binomial name
- Nannosquilla decemspinosa (Rathbun, 1910)

= Nannosquilla decemspinosa =

Species of crustacean

Nannosquilla decemspinosa is a species of long-bodied, short-legged mantis shrimp. It lives in shallow sandy areas along the Pacific coast of Central and South America.

It is most well known because when stranded by a low tide the 3 cm stomatopod lies on its back and performs backwards somersaults over and over. The animal moves up to 2 meters at a time by rolling 20-40 times, with speeds of around 72 revolutions per minute - 1.5 body lengths per second (3.5 cm/s). Researchers estimate that the stomatopod acts as a true wheel around 40% of the time during this series of rolls. The remaining 60% of the time it has to "jumpstart" a roll by using its body to thrust itself upwards and forwards.
