= O. australiensis =

O. australiensis may refer to:

- Oryza australiensis, Australian rice, a species of wild rice
- Ovalipes australiensis, the surf crab, a species of crab in the family Ovalipidae
