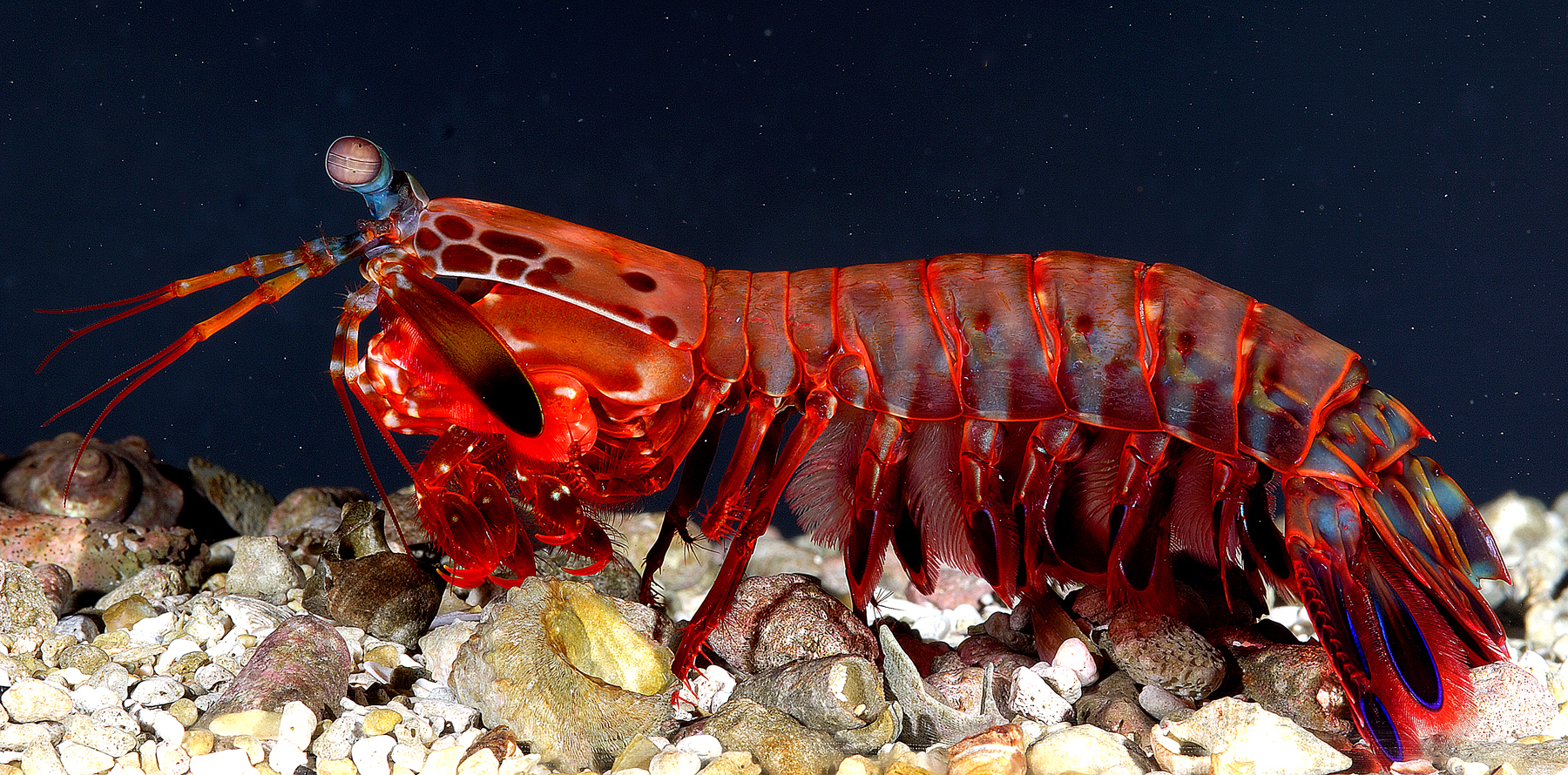
- Odontodactylus scyllarus
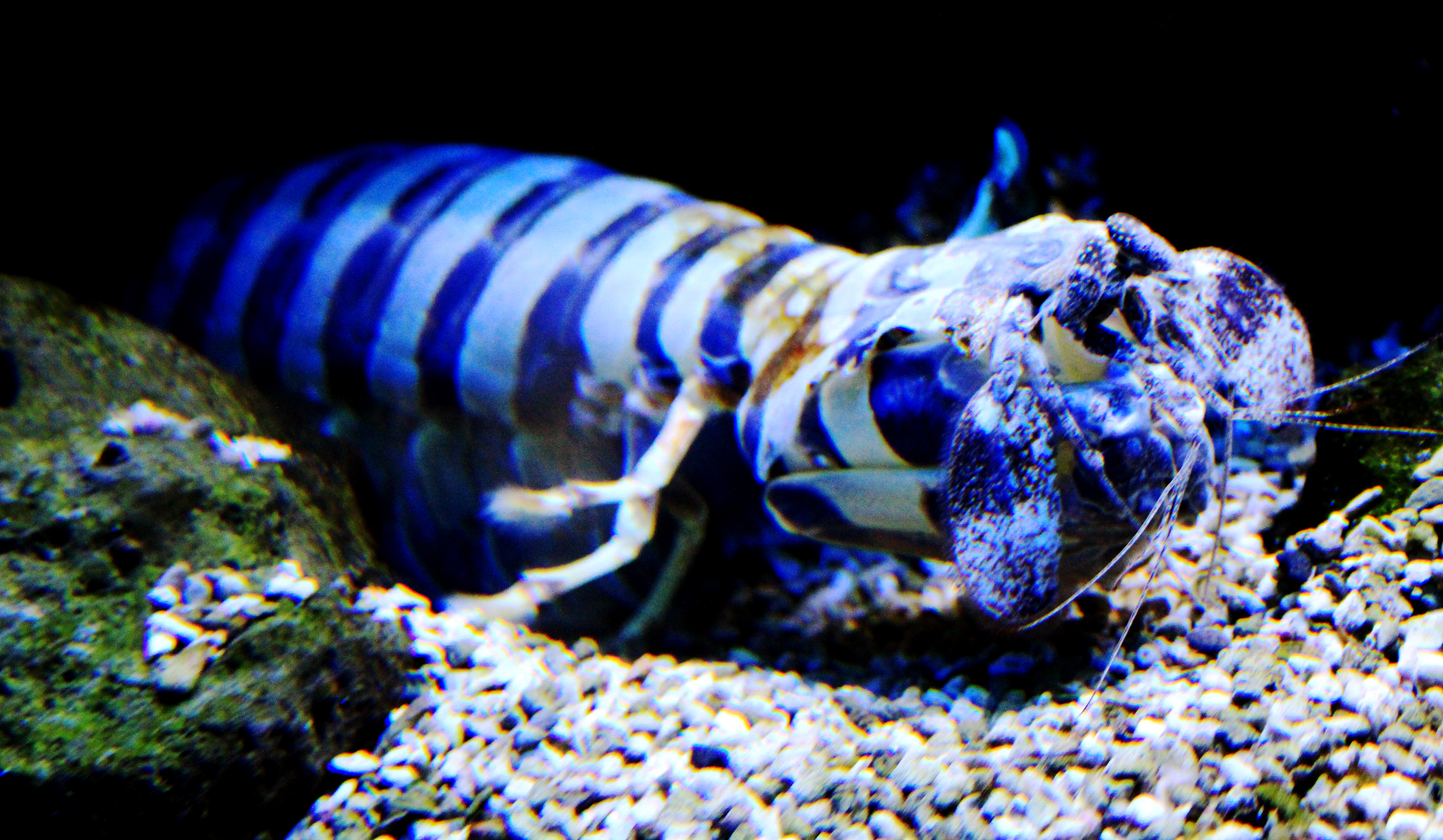
- Lysiosquillina maculata (Zebra mantis shrimp)

Scientific classification
- Kingdom: Animalia
- Phylum: Arthropoda
- Clade: Pancrustacea
- Class: Malacostraca
- Subclass: Hoplocarida
- Order: Stomatopoda; Latreille, 1817

Subdivisions
- Superfamilies and families Bathysquilloidea: Bathysquillidae; Indosquillidae; Gonodactyloidea: Alainosquillidae; Hemisquillidae; Gonodactylidae; Odontodactylidae; Protosquillidae; Pseudosquillidae; Takuidae; Erythrosquilloidea: Erythrosquillidae; Lysiosquilloidea: Coronididae; Lysiosquillidae; Nannosquillidae; Tetrasquillidae; Squilloidea: Squillidae; Eurysquilloidea: Eurysquillidae; Parasquilloidea: Parasquillidae

= Mantis shrimp =

Mantis shrimp Temporal range: Carboniferous–Recent

Order of crustaceans

Mantis shrimp are carnivorous marine crustaceans of the order Stomatopoda (from Ancient Greek στόμα (stóma) 'mouth' and πούς (poús) 'foot'). Stomatopods branched off from other members of the class Malacostraca around 400 million years ago, with more than 520 extant species of mantis shrimp known. All living species are in the suborder Unipeltata, which arose around 250 million years ago. They are among the most important predators in many shallow, tropical and subtropical marine habitats. Despite being common in their habitats, they are poorly understood, as many species spend most of their lives sheltering in burrows and holes.

Dubbed "sea locusts" by ancient Assyrians, "prawn killers" in Australia, and now sometimes referred to as "thumb splitters" due to their ability to inflict painful wounds if handled incautiously, mantis shrimp possess powerful raptorial appendages that are used to attack and kill prey either by spearing, stunning, or dismembering; the shape of these appendages are often used to classify them into groups: extant mantis shrimp either have appendages which form heavily mineralized "clubs" that can strike with great power, or they have sharp, grasping forelimbs used to swiftly seize prey (similar to those of mantises, hence their common name).

== Description ==
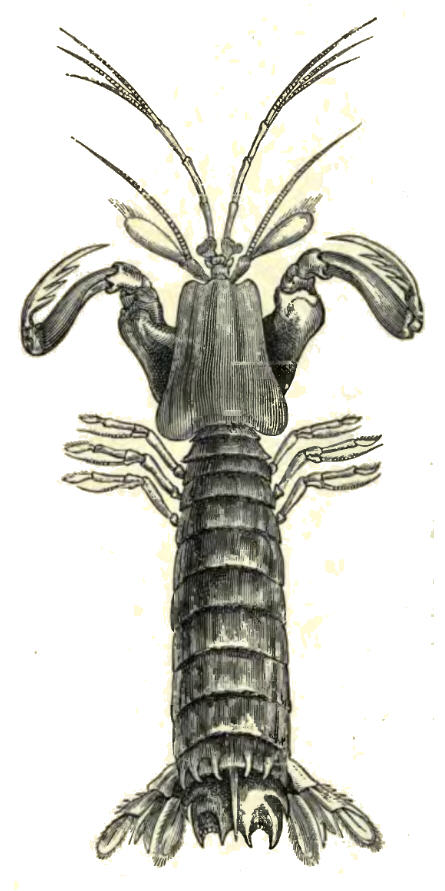
Drawing of a mantis shrimp by Richard Lydekker. The folded raptorial claws are flanking the carapace.

Mantis shrimp typically grow to around 10 cm (3.9 in) in length, while a few species such as the zebra mantis shrimp can reach up to 38 cm (15 in). A mantis shrimp's carapace covers only the rear part of the head and the first four segments of the thorax. Mantis shrimp widely range in colour, with some species mostly being shades of brown, while others have multiple contrasting, vivid colours.

=== Claws ===
The mantis shrimp's second pair of thoracic appendages is adapted for powerful close-range combat. The appendage differences divide mantis shrimp into two main types: those that hunt by impaling their prey with spear-like structures and those that smash prey with a powerful blow from a heavily mineralised club-like appendage. A considerable amount of damage can be inflicted after impact with these robust, hammer-like claws. This club is further divided into three subregions: the impact region, the periodic region, and the striated region. Mantis shrimp are commonly separated into distinct groups (most are categorized as either spearers or smashers but there are some outliers) as determined by the type of claws they possess:

- Spearers are armed with spiny appendages - the spines having barbed tips - used to stab and snag prey. These raptorial appendages resemble those of mantises, hence the common name of these crustaceans. This is the type found in most mantis shrimp.
- Smashers possess a much more developed club and a more rudimentary spear (which is nevertheless quite sharp and still used in fights between their own kind); the club is used to bludgeon and smash their prey apart. The inner aspect of the terminal portion of the appendage can also possess a sharp edge, used to cut prey while the mantis shrimp swims. This is found in the families Gonodactylidae, Odontodactylidae, Protosquillidae, and Takuidae.
- Spike smashers (hammers or primitive smashers): An unspecialized form, found only in the basal family Hemisquillidae. The last segment lacks spines except at the tip, so it is not as effective at spearing but can also be used for smashing.
- Hatchet: An unusual, highly derived appendage that only a few species have. This body plan is largely unresearched.

Both types strike by rapidly unfolding and swinging their raptorial claws at the prey, and can inflict serious damage on victims significantly greater in size than themselves. In Odontodactylus scyllarus, these two weapons are employed with blinding quickness, with an acceleration of 10,400 g (102,000 m/s^{2} or 335,000 ft/s^{2}) and speeds of 23 m/s (83 km/h; 51 mph) from a standing start. Because they strike so rapidly, they generate vapor-filled bubbles in the water between the appendage and the striking surface—known as cavitation bubbles. The collapse of these cavitation bubbles produces measurable forces on their prey in addition to the instantaneous forces of 1,500 newtons that are caused by the impact of the appendage against the striking surface, which means that the prey is hit twice by a single strike; first by the claw and then by the collapsing cavitation bubbles that immediately follow. Even if the initial strike misses the prey, the resulting shock wave can be enough to stun or kill. The collapsing bubbles also produce light, which is termed sonoluminescence.

The species Gonodactylus smithii has the fastest strikes reported for any species of mantis shrimp species, with a speed of 30.6 m/s (110 km/h; 68 mph) and an acceleration of 1.5×10^{5} m/s^{2}. The species O. scyllarus achieves an acceleration of 1×10^{5} m/s^{2}. By comparison, a Beretta 92S with a 127 mm barrel, 9 mm caliber bullets and a muzzle speed of 335 m/s (1206 km/h; 749 mph) achieves an acceleration of 4.41×10^{5} m/s^{2}.

The power amplifier spring mechanism mediated by a latch has the limitation that the time taken for the strikes being executed is shorter than the nerve conduction time of the mantis shrimp; consequently, the strike cannot be controlled or directed whilst it is being executed, meaning that the trajectory of the strike must be prepared either before or after it is delivered.

Smashers use this ability to attack crabs, snails, rock oysters, and other molluscs, their blunt clubs enabling them to crack the shells of their prey into pieces. Spearers, however, prefer the meat of softer animals, such as fish and cephalopods, which their barbed claws can more easily slice and snag.

The appendages are being studied as a microscale analogue for new macroscale material structures.

=== Eyes ===
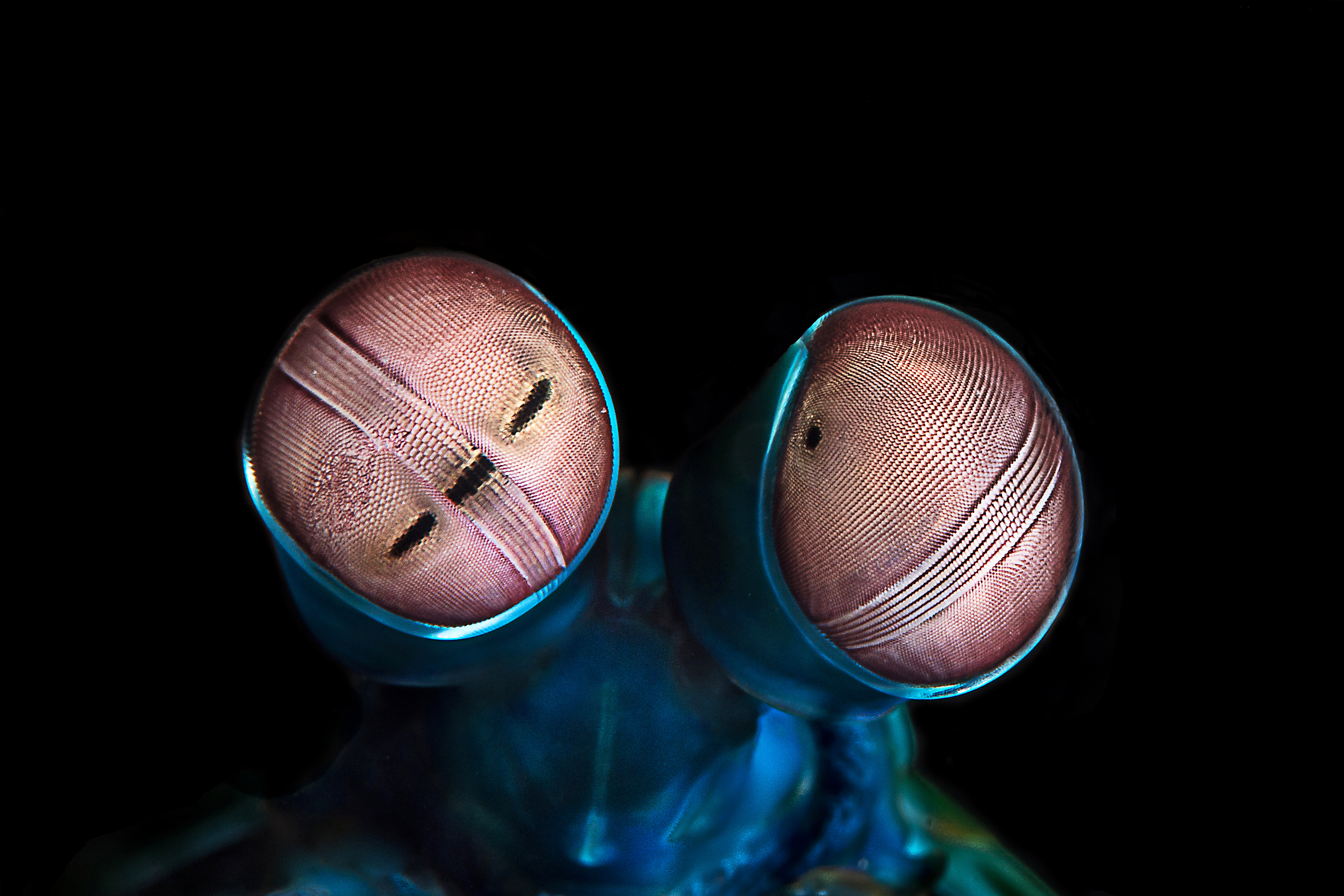
Close-up of a peacock mantis shrimp showing the structure of the eyes. The three dark spots are pseudopupils, indicating the ommatidia that are pointing towards the camera's POV

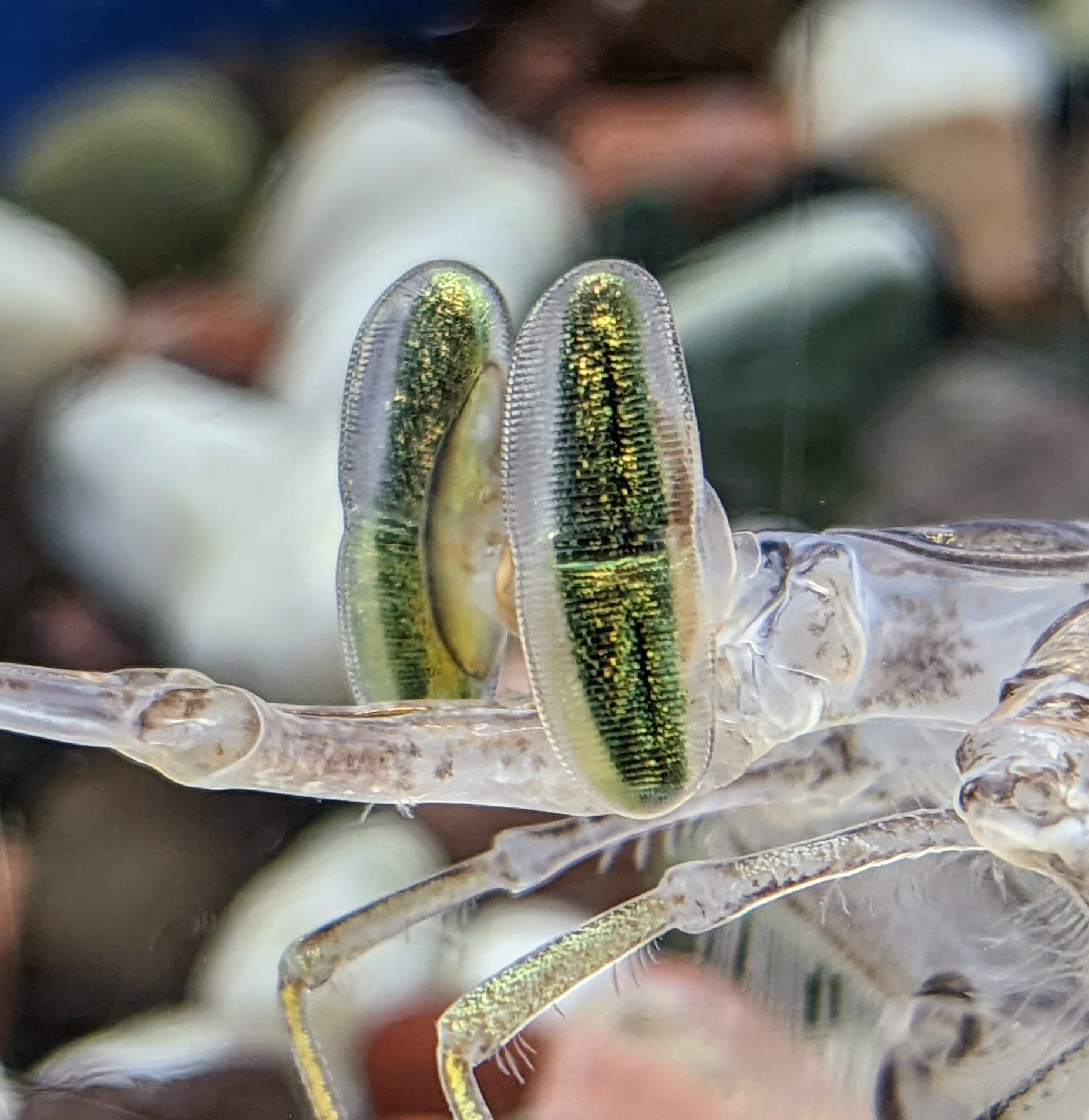
Close up of Oratosquilla oratoria eyes

The eyes of the mantis shrimp are mounted on mobile stalks and their eyes can move independently of each other. The extreme mobility allows them to be rotated in all three dimensions, yet the position of their eyes has shown to have little effect on the perception of their surroundings. Mantis shrimp are thought to have the most complex eyes in the animal kingdom and the most complex front-end for any visual system ever discovered.

Each compound eye is made up of tens of thousands of ommatidia, clusters of photoreceptor cells. Each eye consists of two flattened hemispheres separated by parallel rows of specialised ommatidia, collectively called the midband. The number of ommatidial rows in the midband ranges from two to six. This divides the eye into three regions. This configuration enables mantis shrimp to see objects that are near the mid-plane of an eye with three parts of the same eye (as can be seen in some photos showing three pseudopupils in one eye). In other words, each eye possesses trinocular vision, and therefore depth perception, for objects near its mid-plane. The upper and lower hemispheres are used primarily for recognition of form and motion, like the eyes of many other crustaceans.

Compared with the four types of photoreceptor cell that humans possess in their eyes, the eyes of a mantis shrimp have between 12 and 16 types of photoreceptor cells. Furthermore, some of these stomatopods can tune the sensitivity of their long wavelength colour vision to adapt to their environment. This phenomenon, called "spectral tuning", is species-specific. Cheroske et al. did not observe spectral tuning in Neogonodactylus oerstedii, the species with the most monotonous natural photic environment. In N. bredini, a species with a variety of habitats ranging from a depth of 5 to 10 m (although it can be found down to 20 m below the surface), spectral tuning was observed, but the ability to alter wavelengths of maximum absorbance was not as pronounced as in N. wennerae, a species with much higher ecological/photic habitat diversity. The diversity of spectral tuning in Stomatopoda is also hypothesised to be directly linked to mutations in the retinal binding pocket of the opsin.

The huge diversity seen in mantis shrimp photoreceptors likely comes from ancient gene duplication events. One consequence of this duplication is the lack of correlation between opsin transcript number and physiologically expressed photoreceptors. One species may have six different opsin genes, but only express one spectrally distinct photoreceptor. Over the years, some mantis shrimp species have lost the ancestral phenotype, although some still maintain 16 distinct photoreceptors and four light filters. Species that live in a variety of photic environments have high selective pressure for photoreceptor diversity, and maintain ancestral phenotypes better than species that live in murky waters or are primarily nocturnal.

Mantis shrimp can perceive wavelengths of light ranging from deep ultraviolet (300 nm) to far-red (720 nm) and polarised light. In mantis shrimp in the superfamilies Gonodactyloidea, Lysiosquilloidea, and Hemisquilloidea, the midband is made up of six ommatidial rows. Rows 1 to 4 process colours, while rows 5 and 6 detect circularly or linearly polarised light. Twelve types of photoreceptor cells are in rows 1 to 4, four of which detect ultraviolet light. Despite the impressive range of wavelengths that mantis shrimp have the ability to see, they do not have the ability to discriminate wavelengths less than 25 nm apart. It is suggested that not discriminating between closely positioned wavelengths allows these organisms to make determinations of its surroundings with little processing delay. Having little delay in evaluating surroundings is important for mantis shrimp, since they are territorial and frequently in combat. However, some mantis shrimp have been found capable of distinguishing between high-saturation and low-saturation colors.

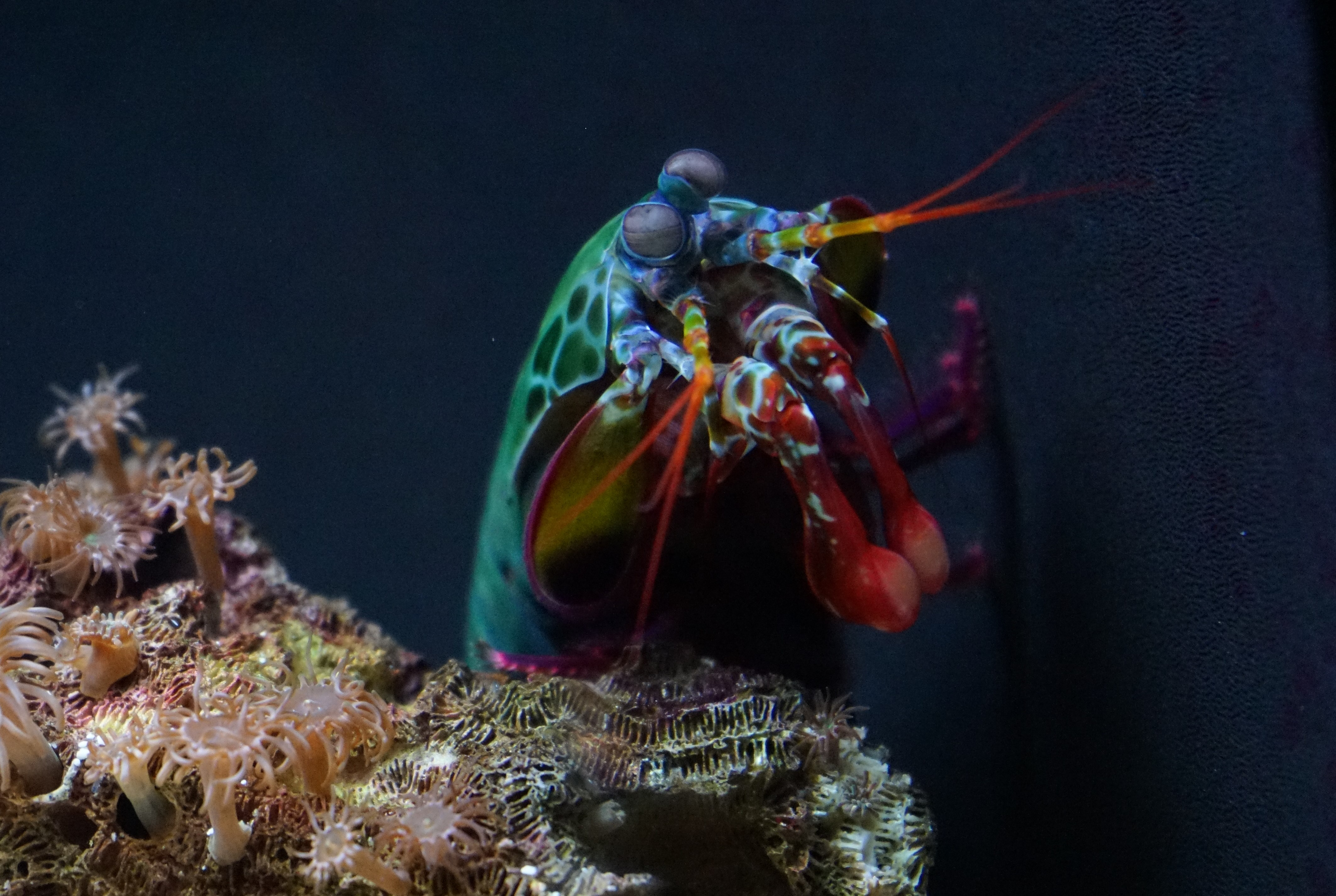
Peacock mantis shrimp at the National Aquarium

Their UV vision can detect five different frequency bands in the deep ultraviolet. To do this, they use two photoreceptors in combination with four different colour filters. They are currently believed to be insensitive to infrared light. The optical elements in these rows have eight different classes of visual pigments and the rhabdom (area of eye that absorbs light from a single direction) is divided into three different pigmented layers (tiers), each for different wavelengths. The three tiers in rows 2 and 3 are separated by colour filters (intrarhabdomal filters) that can be divided into four distinct classes, with two classes in each row. Each consists of a tier, a colour filter of one class, another tier, a colour filter of another class, and then a last tier. These colour filters allow the mantis shrimp to see with diverse colour vision. Without the filters, the pigments themselves make up only a small segment of the visual spectrum, from about 490 to 550 nm. Rows 5 and 6 are also segregated into different tiers, but have only one class of visual pigment, the ninth class, and are specialised for polarisation vision. A tenth class of visual pigment is found in the upper and lower hemispheres of the eye.

Some species have at least 16 photoreceptor types, which are divided into four classes (their spectral sensitivity is further tuned by colour filters in the retinas), 12 for colour analysis in the different wavelengths (including six which are sensitive to ultraviolet light) and four for analysing polarised light. By comparison, most humans have only four visual pigments, of which three are dedicated to seeing colour, and human lenses block ultraviolet light. The visual information leaving the retina seems to be processed into numerous parallel data streams leading into the brain, greatly reducing the analytical requirements at higher levels.

The midband covers only about 5 to 10° of the visual field at any given instant, but like most crustaceans, mantis shrimps' eyes are mounted on stalks. In mantis shrimp, the movement of the stalked eye is unusually free, and can be driven up to 70° in all possible axes of movement by eight eyecup muscles divided into six functional groups. By using these muscles to scan the surroundings with the midband, they can add information about forms, shapes, and landscape, which cannot be detected by the upper and lower hemispheres of the eyes. They can also track moving objects using large, rapid eye movements where the two eyes move independently.

==== Polarized light ====
Six species of mantis shrimp have been reported to be able to detect circularly polarised light, which has not been documented in any other animal. They perform this feat by converting circularly polarized light into linearly polarized light via quarter-waveplates formed from stacks of microvilli. Some of their biological quarter-waveplates perform more uniformly over the visual spectrum than any current man-made polarising optics, and this could inspire new types of optical media that would outperform early 21st century Blu-ray Disc technology.

The species Gonodactylus smithii is the only organism known to simultaneously detect the four linear and two circular polarisation components required to measure all four Stokes parameters, which yield a full description of polarisation. It is thus believed to have optimal polarisation vision. It is the only animal known to have dynamic polarisation vision. This is achieved by rotational eye movements to maximise the polarisation contrast between the object in focus and its background. Since each eye moves independently from the other, it creates two separate streams of visual information.

==== Suggested advantages of visual system ====
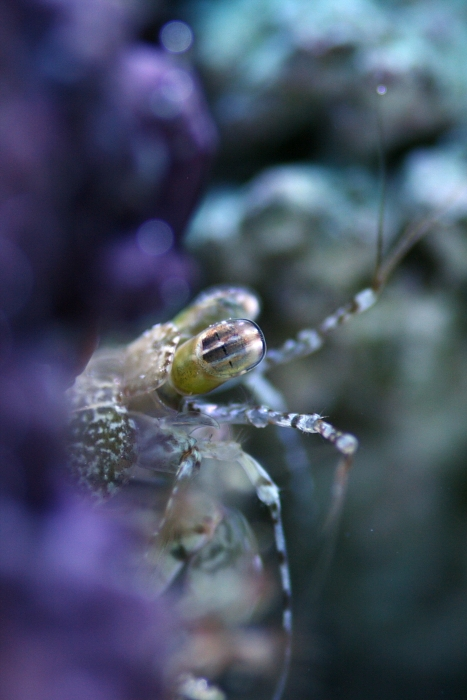
Close-up of the trinocular vision of Pseudosquilla ciliata

What advantage sensitivity to polarisation confers is unclear; however, polarisation vision is used by other animals for sexual signaling and secret communication that avoids the attention of predators. This mechanism could provide an evolutionary advantage; it only requires small changes to the cell in the eye and could easily lead to natural selection.

The eyes of mantis shrimp may enable them to recognise different types of coral, prey species (which are often transparent or semitransparent), or predators, such as barracuda, which have shimmering scales. Alternatively, the manner in which they hunt (very rapid movements of the claws) may require very accurate ranging information, which would require accurate depth perception. The capacity to see UV light may enable observation of otherwise hard-to-detect prey on coral reefs.

During mating rituals, mantis shrimp actively fluoresce, and the wavelength of this fluorescence matches the wavelengths detected by their eye pigments. Females are fertile only during certain phases of the tidal cycle; the ability to perceive the phase of the moon may, therefore, help prevent wasted mating efforts. It may also give these shrimps information about the size of the tide, which is important to species living in shallow water near the shore.

Researchers suspect that the broader variety of photoreceptors in the eyes of mantis shrimp allows visual information to be preprocessed by the eyes instead of the brain, which would otherwise have to be larger to deal with the complex task of opponent process colour perception used by other species, thus requiring more time and energy. While the eyes themselves are complex and not yet fully understood, the principle of the system appears to be simple. It has a similar set of sensitivities to the human visual system, but works in the opposite manner. In the human brain, the inferior temporal cortex has a huge number of colour-specific neurons, which process visual impulses from the eyes to extract colour information. The mantis shrimp instead uses the different types of photoreceptors in its eyes to perform the same function as the human brain neurons, resulting in a hardwired and more efficient system for an animal that requires rapid colour identification. Humans have fewer types of photoreceptors, but more colour-tuned neurons, while mantis shrimp appear to have fewer colour neurons and more classes of photoreceptors.

However, a study from 2022 failed to find unequivocal evidence for a solely "barcode"-like visual system as described above. Stomatopods of the species Haptosquilla trispinosa were able to distinguish high and low-saturation colors from grey, contravening Thoen and colleagues. It may be that some combination of color opponency and photoreceptor activation comparison/barcode analysis is present.

The shrimps use a form of reflector of polarised light not yet found elswhere in nature or human technology. It allows the manipulation of light across the structure rather than through its depth, the typical way polarisers work. This allows the structure to be both small and microscopically thin, and still be able to produce big, bright, colourful polarised signals.

== Ecology and life history ==
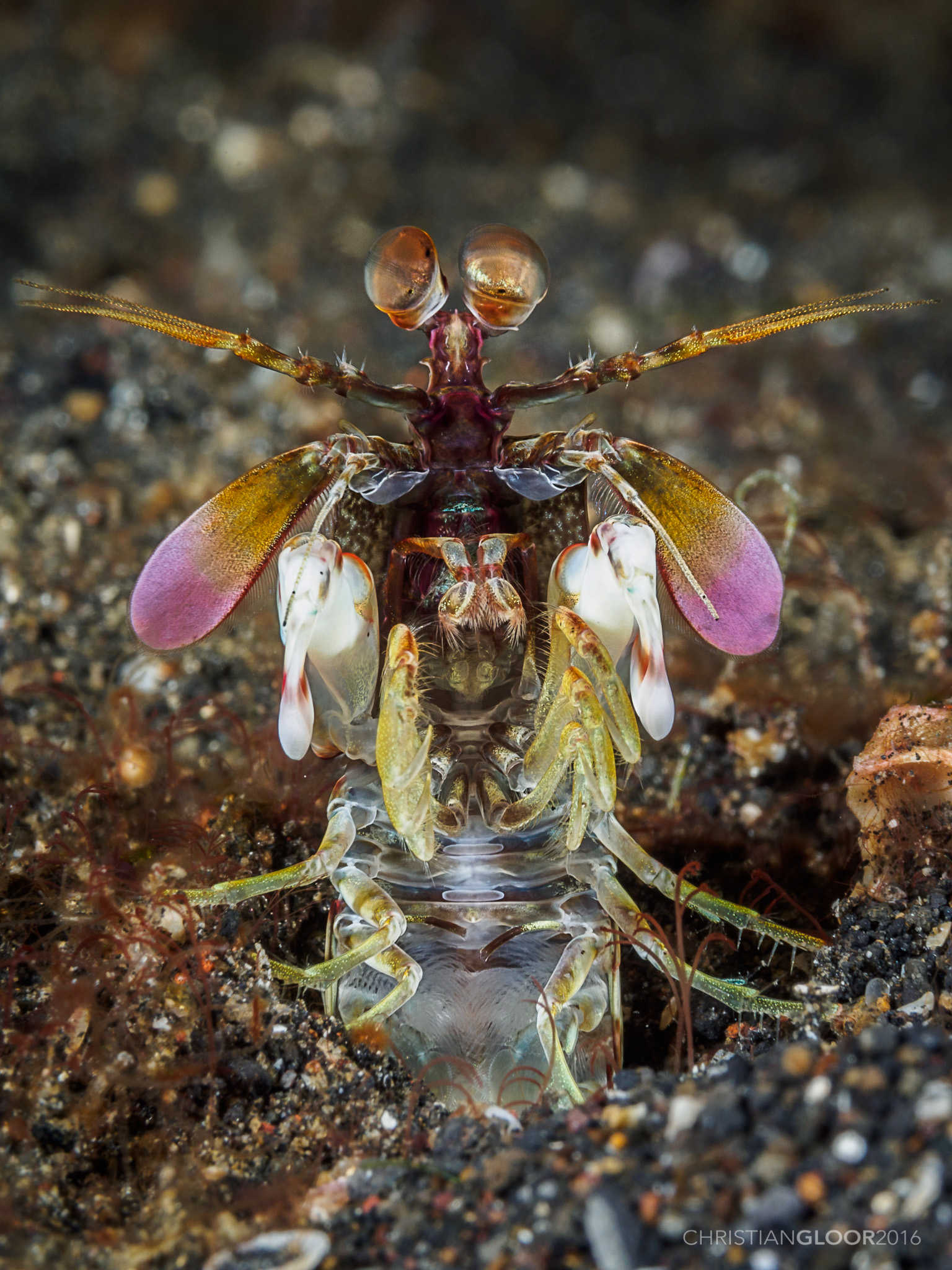
Odontodactylus latirostris at Wakatobi National Park Sulawesi, partially out of its burrow

Mantis shrimp are long-lived and exhibit complex behaviour, such as ritualised fighting, or by the use of fluorescent patterns on their bodies for signalling with their own and perhaps even other species. Many have developed complex social behaviours to defend their space from rivals. Neogonodactylus oerstedii have been observed to perform a posture known as the meral spread, which seems to indicate fighting ability. Mantis shrimp are typically solitary sea creatures that may aggressively defend their burrows, either rock formations or self-dug intricate burrows in the seabed. They are rarely seen outside their homes except to feed and relocate. They can learn and remember well, and are able to recognise neighbouring mantis shrimp with which they frequently interact. They can recognise them by visual signs and even by individual smell.

Mantis shrimp can be diurnal, nocturnal, or crepuscular (active at twilight), depending on the species. Unlike most crustaceans, they sometimes hunt, chase, and kill prey. Although some live in temperate seas, most species live in tropical and subtropical waters in the Indian and Pacific Oceans, encompassing the seas between eastern Africa and Hawaii.

Mantis shrimp live in burrows where they spend the majority of their time. The spearing species build their habitat in soft sediments and the smashing species make burrows in hard substrata, such as cavities in coral. These two habitats are crucial for their ecology since they use burrows as sites for retreat and as locations for consuming their prey. Burrows and coral cavities are also used as sites for mating and for keeping their eggs safe. Stomatopod body size undergoes periodic growth which necessitates finding a new cavity or burrow that will fit the animal's new diameter. Some spearing species can modify their pre-established habitat if the burrow is made of silt or mud, which can be expanded.

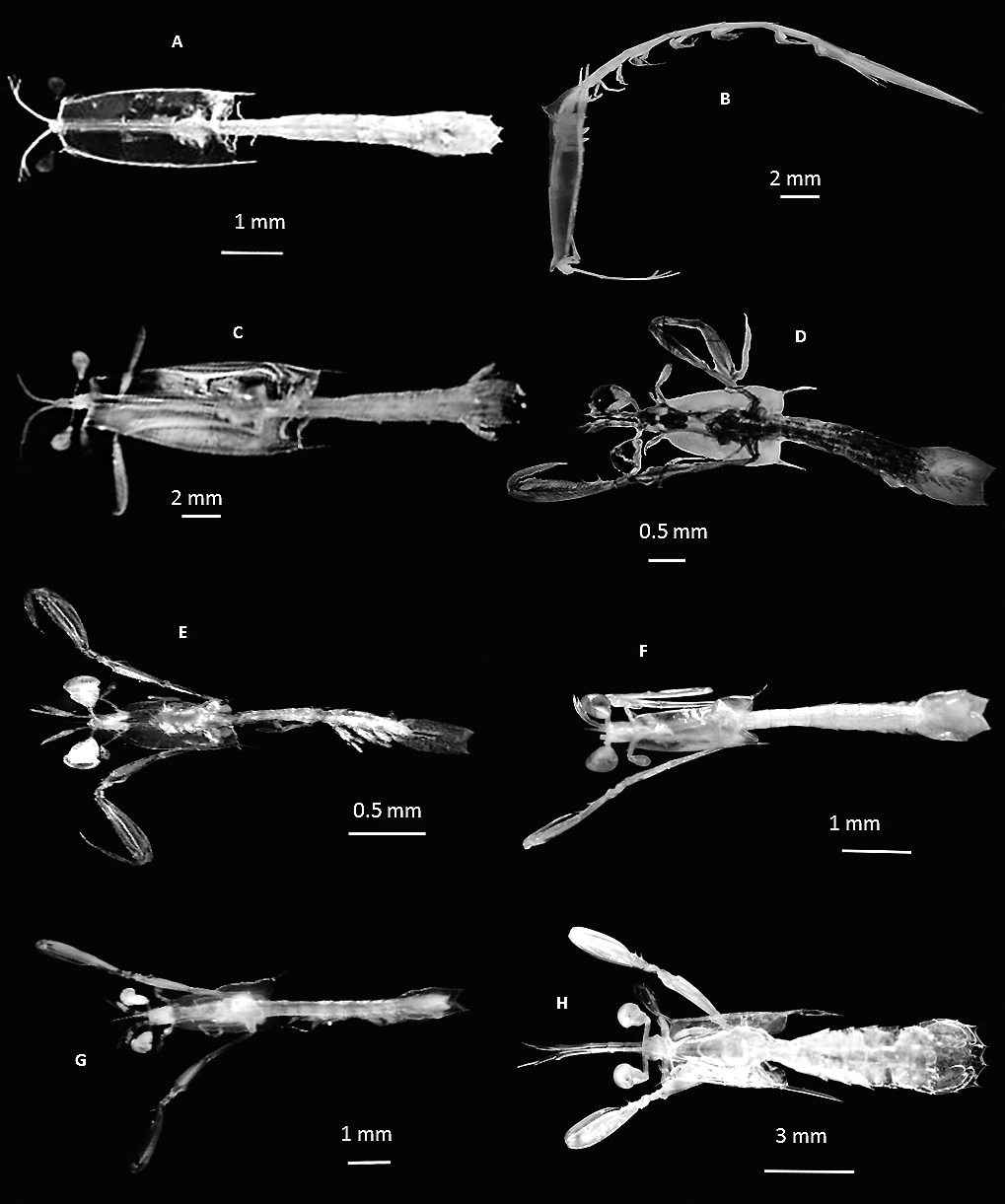
Assortment of larval stomatopods

Stomatopods can have as many as 20 or 30 breeding episodes over their lifespan. Depending on the species, the eggs are either laid and kept in a burrow, or are carried around under the female's tail until they hatch, as in a number of other crustaceans. Also depending on the species, males and females may come together only to mate, or they may bond in monogamous, long-term relationships.

In the monogamous species, the mantis shrimp remain with the same partner up to 20 years. They share the same burrow and may be able to coordinate their activities. Both sexes often take care of the eggs (bi-parental care). In Pullosquilla and some species in Nannosquilla, the female lays two clutches of eggs – one that the male tends and one that the female tends. In other species, the female looks after the eggs while the male hunts for both of them. After the eggs hatch, the offspring may spend up to three months as plankton.

Although stomatopods typically display the standard types of movement seen in true shrimp and lobsters, one species, Nannosquilla decemspinosa, has been observed rolling itself into a crude wheel (somewhat resembling volvation). The species lives in shallow, sandy areas. At low tides, N. decemspinosa is often stranded by its short rear legs, which are sufficient for movement when the body is supported by water, but not on dry land. The mantis shrimp thus performs a forward flip in an attempt to roll towards the nearest tide pool. N. has been observed to roll repeatedly for 2 m (6.6 ft), but specimens typically travel less than 1 m (3.3 ft).

== Systematics ==
=== Evolutionary history ===
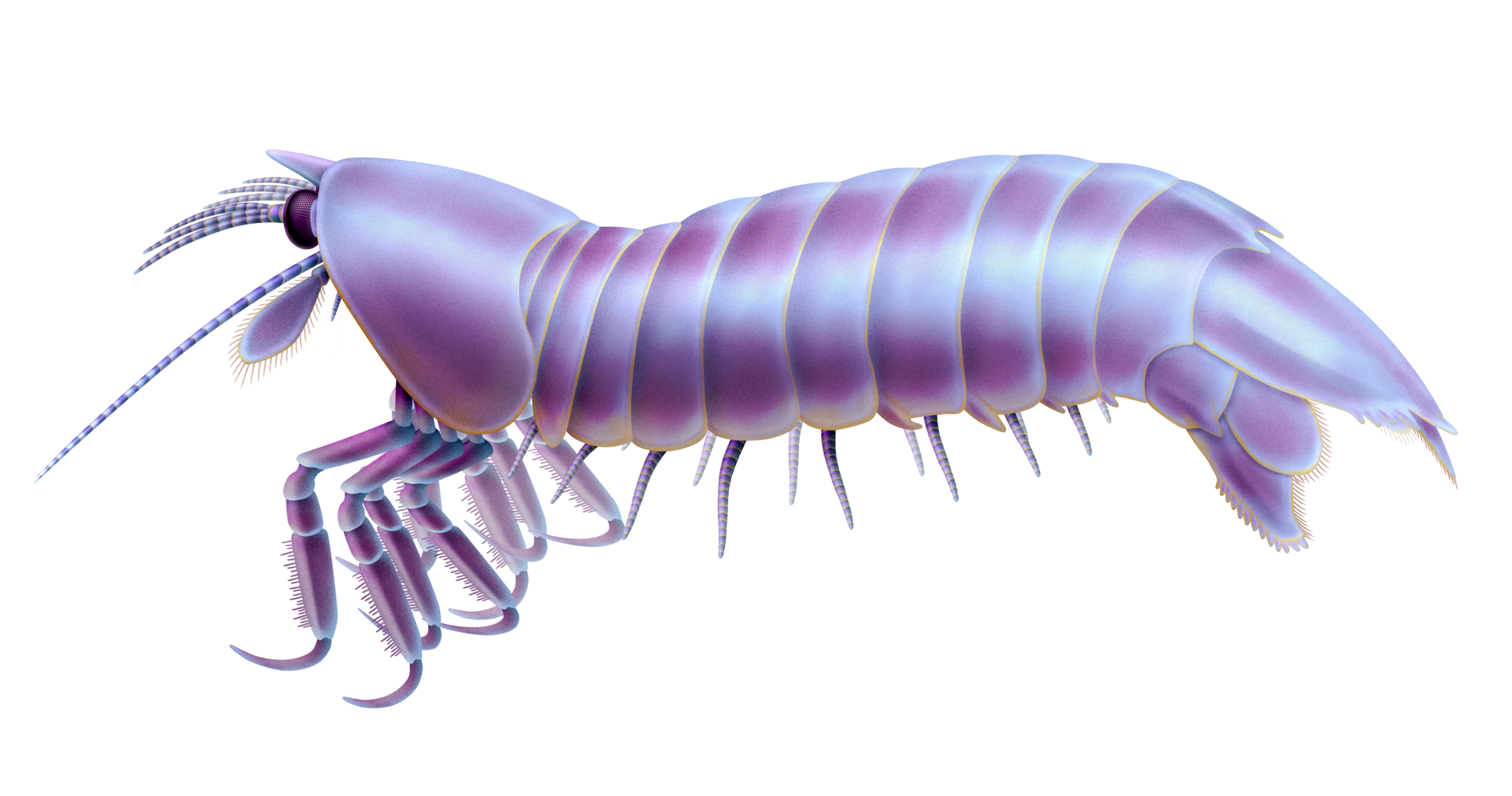
Reconstruction of Daidal, a primitive Carboniferous mantis shrimp

Although the Devonian Eopteridae have been suggested to be early stomatopods, their fragmentary known remains make the referral uncertain. The oldest unambiguous stem-group mantis shrimp date to the Carboniferous (359–300 million years ago). Stem-group mantis shrimp are assigned to two major groups the Palaeostomatopodea and the Archaeostomatopodea, the latter of which are more closely related to modern mantis shrimp, which are assigned to the clade Unipeltata. The oldest members of Unipeltata date to the Triassic.

Cladogram of fossil stomatopods after Smith et al. 2023:

- Stomatopoda
  - †Archaeocaris
    - Archaeocaris vermiformis
    - Archaeocaris graffhami
  - - - †Bairdops elegans
      - †Perimecturus
        - Perimecturus parki
        - Perimecturus rapax
    - †Bairdops beargulchensis
    - - †Daidal pattoni
      - - - - †Daidal schoellmanni
            - †Daidal acanthocercus
          - †Gorgonophontes
            - Gorgonophontes fraiponti
            - Gorgonophontes peleron
        - - †Chabardella spinosa
        - - †Tyrannophontes theridion
          - - †Tyrannophontes gigantion
            - Unipeltata
              - †Triassosculda ahyongi
              - - †Tyrannosculda laurae
                - - †Pseudosculda laevis
                  - - †Archaeosculda phoenicia
                    - - - †Sculda pennata
                        - †Sculda syriaca
                      - - †Ursquilla yehoachi
                        - - †Lysiosquilla nkporoensis
                          - - †Nodosculda fisherorum
                            - Squilla mantis

=== Selected extant species ===
- Family Gonodactylidae
  - Gonodactylus smithii
- Family Hemisquillidae
  - Hemisquilla ensigera
  - Hemisquilla australiensis
  - Hemisquilla braziliensis
  - Hemisquilla californiensis
- Family Lysiosquillidae
  - Lysiosquillina maculata, zebra mantis shrimp or striped mantis shrimp
- Family Nannosquillidae
  - Nannosquilla decemspinosa
  - Platysquilla eusebia
  - Alachosquilla vicina
- Family Odontodactylidae
  - Odontodactylus scyllarus, peacock mantis shrimp
  - Odontodactylus latirostris, pink-eared mantis shrimp
  - Odontodactylus brevirostris
- Family Pseudosquillidae
  - Pseudosquilla ciliata, common mantis shrimp
- Family Squillidae
  - Oratosquilla oratoria (蝦蛄, shako)
  - Rissoides desmaresti
  - Squilla empusa
  - Squilla mantis
- Family Tetrasquillidae
  - Heterosquilla tricarinata, New Zealand
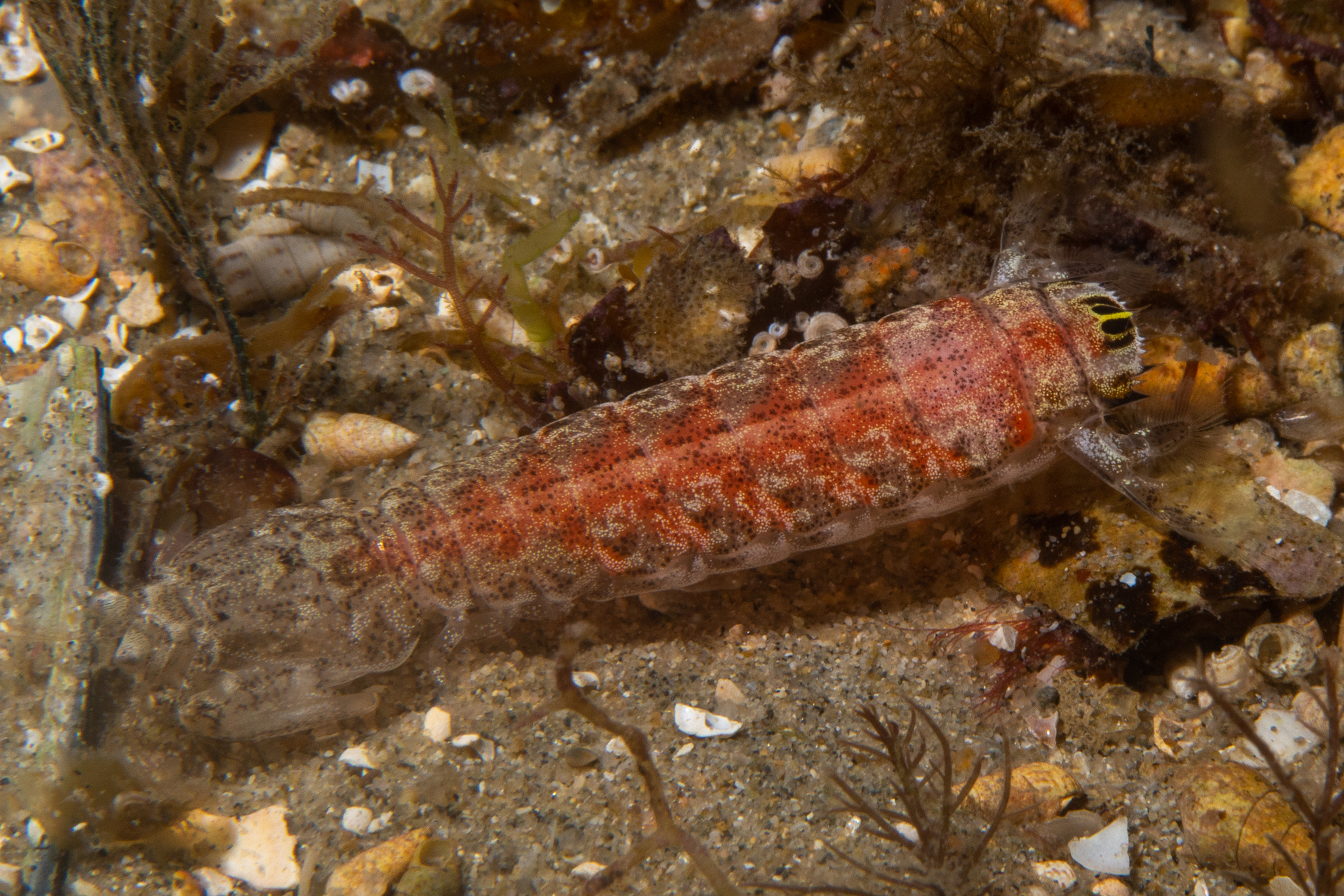
Austrosquilla osculans

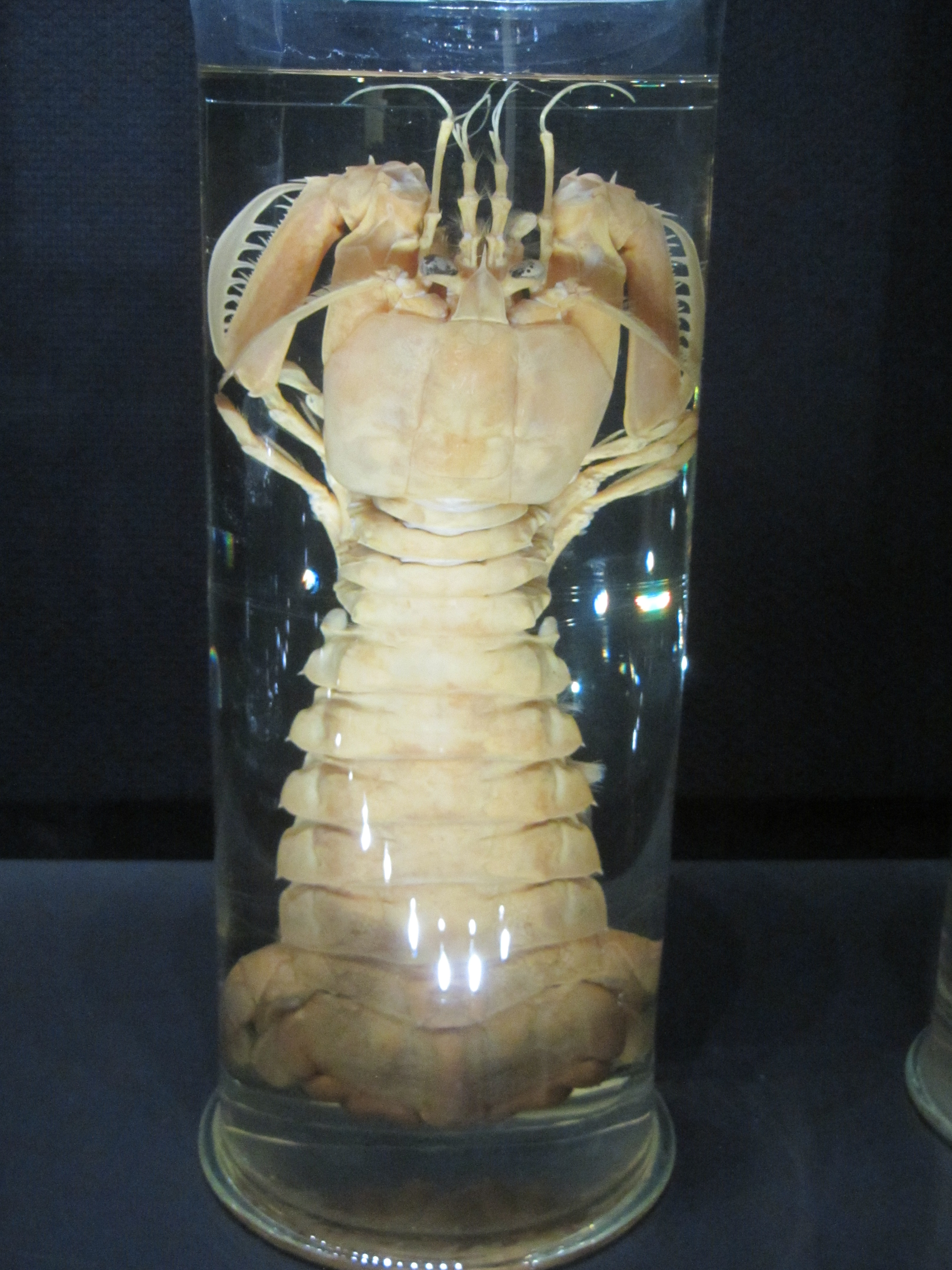
Bathysquilla crassispinosa, museum specimen

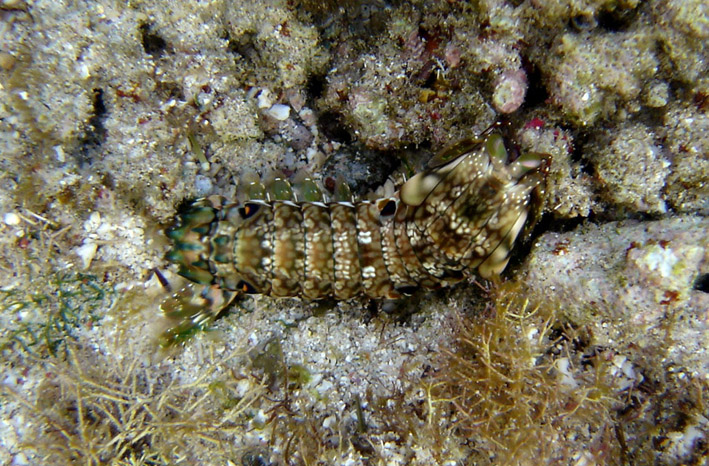
Gonodactylus platysoma

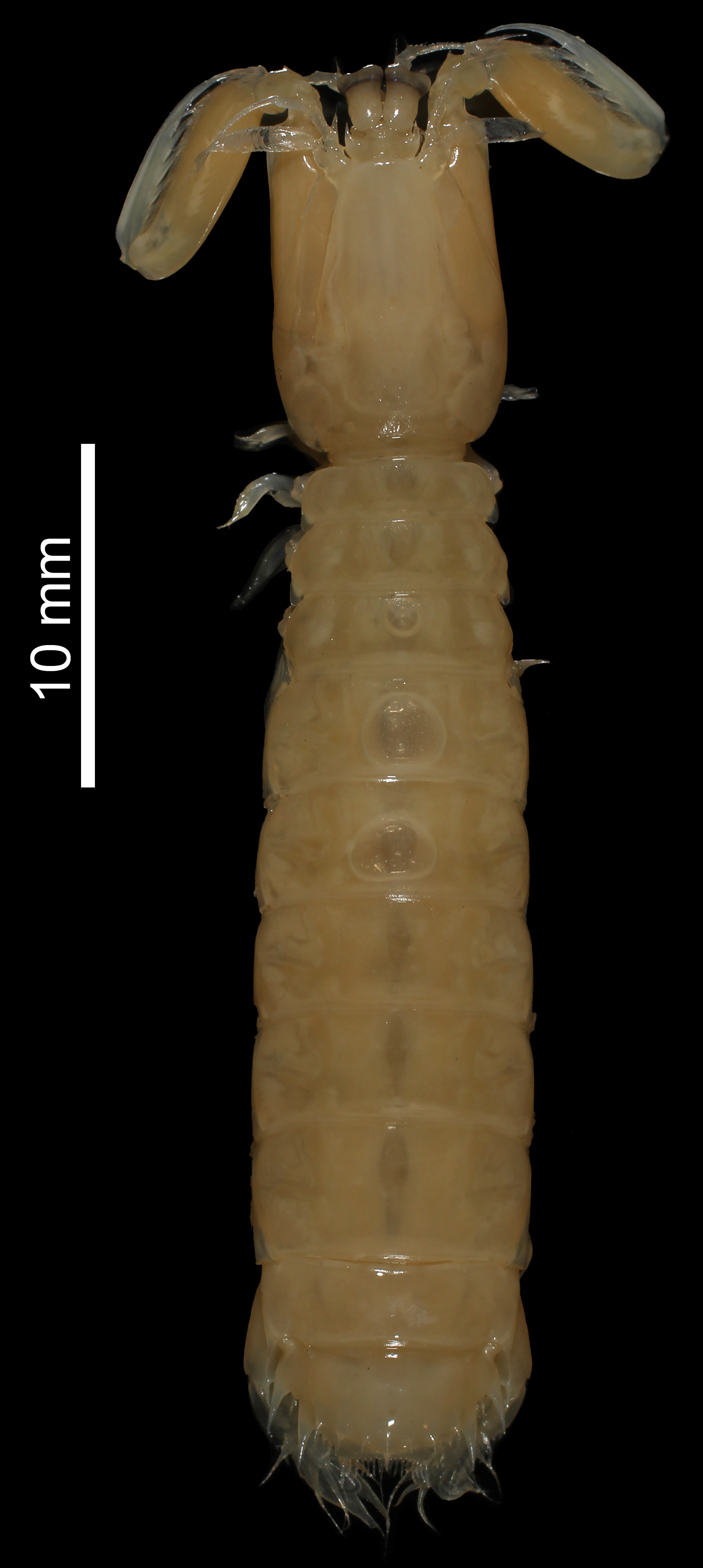
Kasim philippinensis, museum specimen

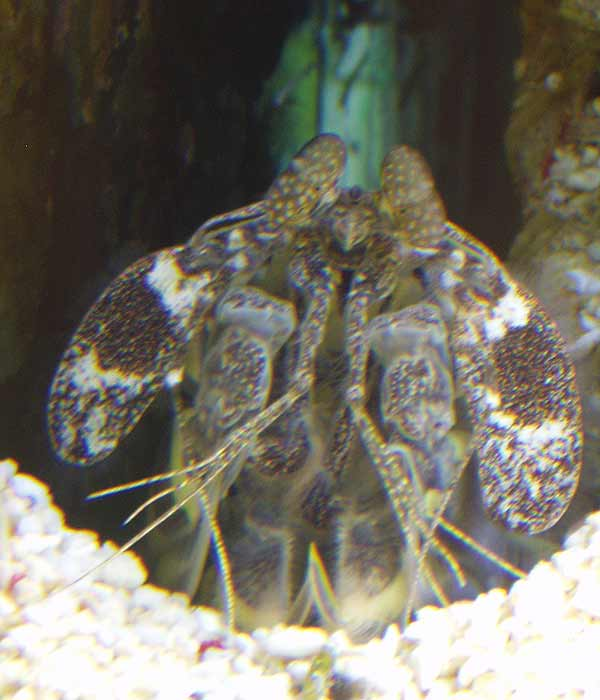
Lysiosquillina maculata

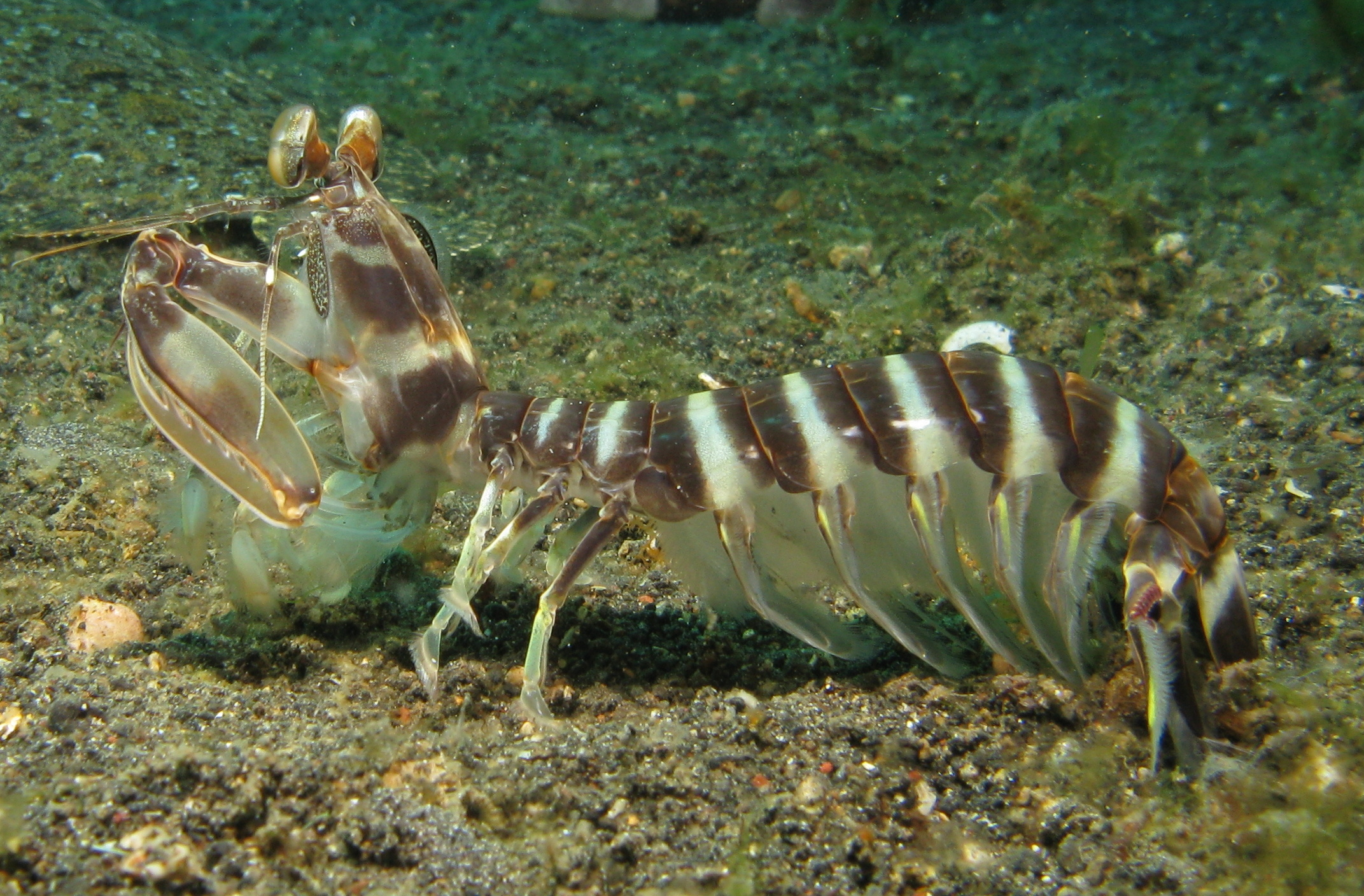
Lysiosquillina maculata outside its burrow

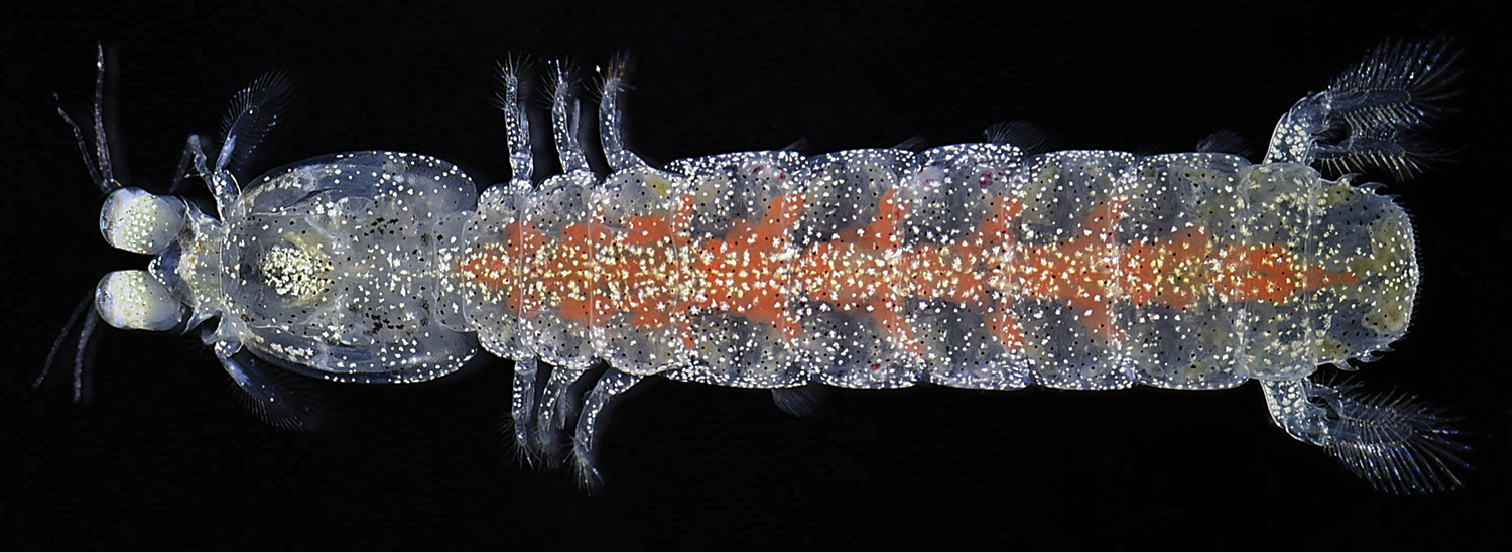
Pullosquilla thomassini

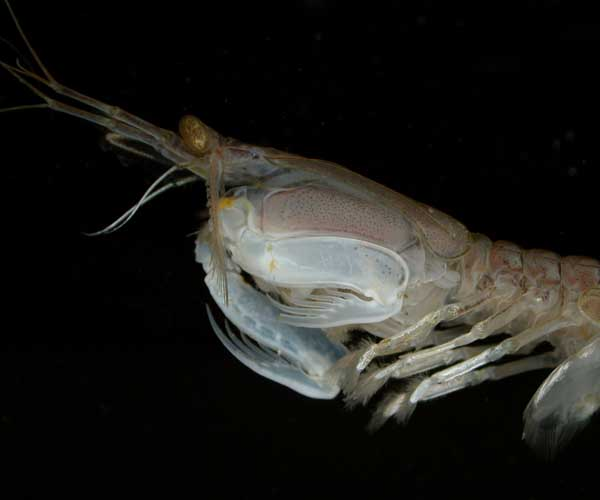
Squilla mantis

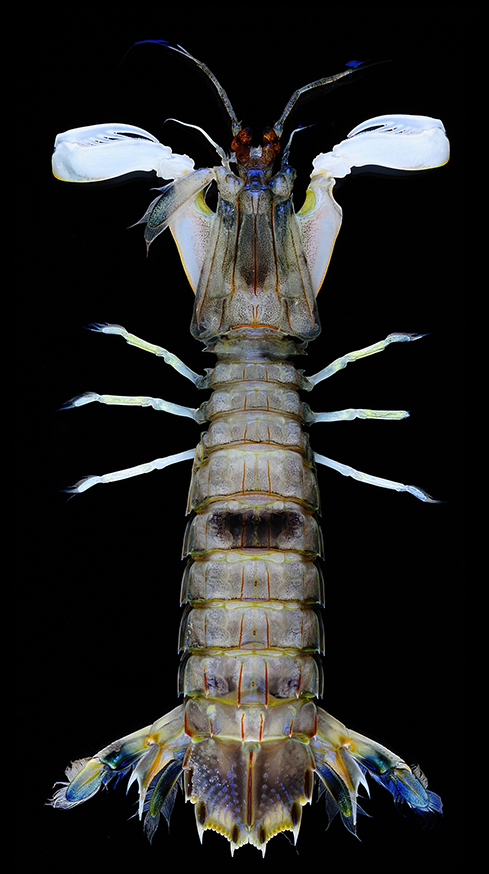
Vossquilla kempi

A large number of mantis shrimp species were first scientifically described by one carcinologist, Raymond B. Manning; the collection of stomatopods he amassed is the largest in the world, covering 90% of the known species whilst 10% are still unknown.

== Culinary uses ==
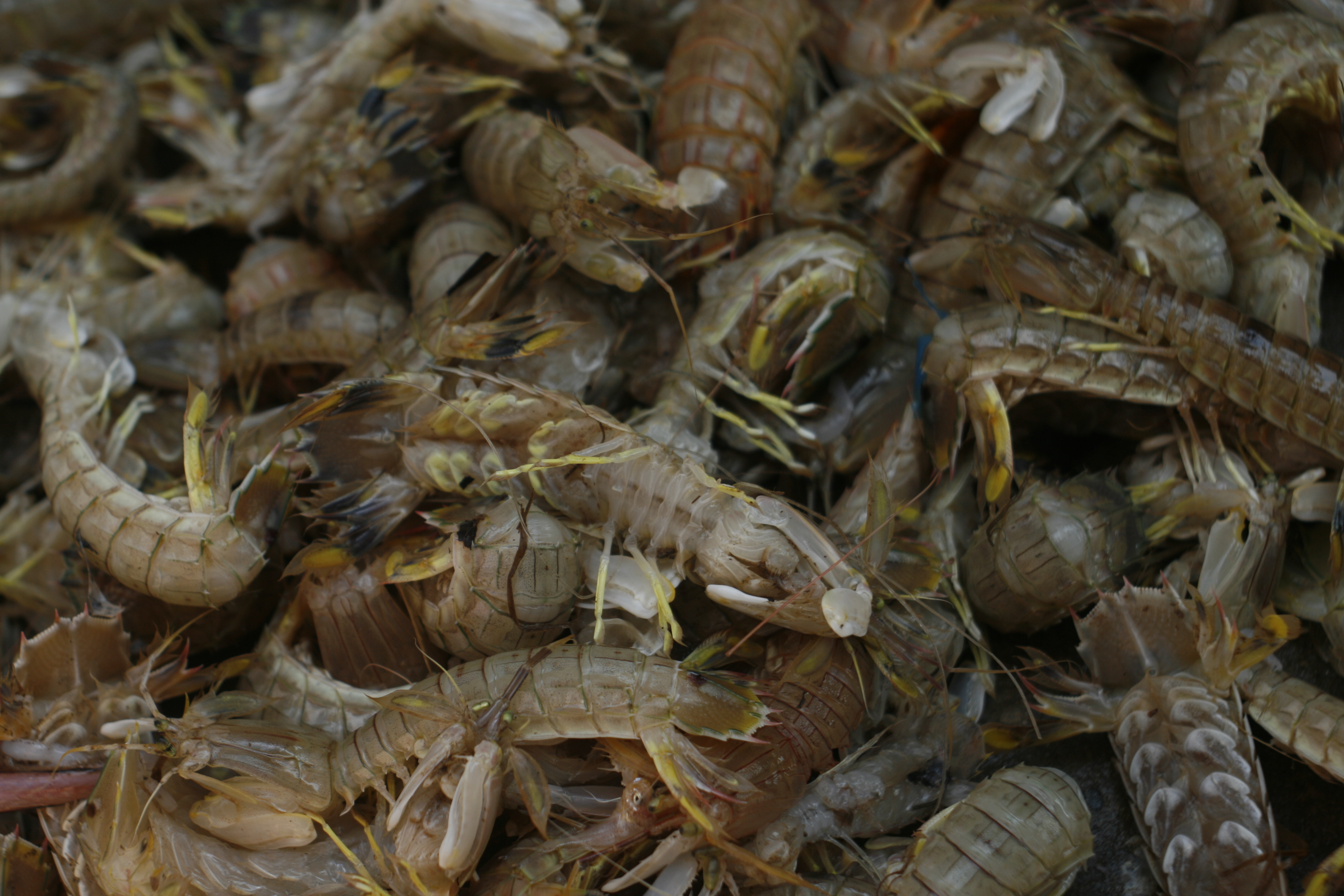
Mantis shrimp caught at Hậu Lộc, Thanh Hóa, Vietnam

The mantis shrimp is eaten by a variety of cultures. In Japanese cuisine, the mantis shrimp species Oratosquilla oratoria, called shako (蝦蛄), is eaten boiled as a sushi topping, and occasionally raw as sashimi.

Mantis shrimp are also abundant along Vietnam's coast, known in Vietnamese as bề bề, tôm tích or tôm tít. In regions such as Nha Trang, they are called bàn chải, named for its resemblance to a scrub brush. The shrimp can be steamed, boiled, grilled, or dried, used with pepper, salt and lime, fish sauce and tamarind, or fennel.

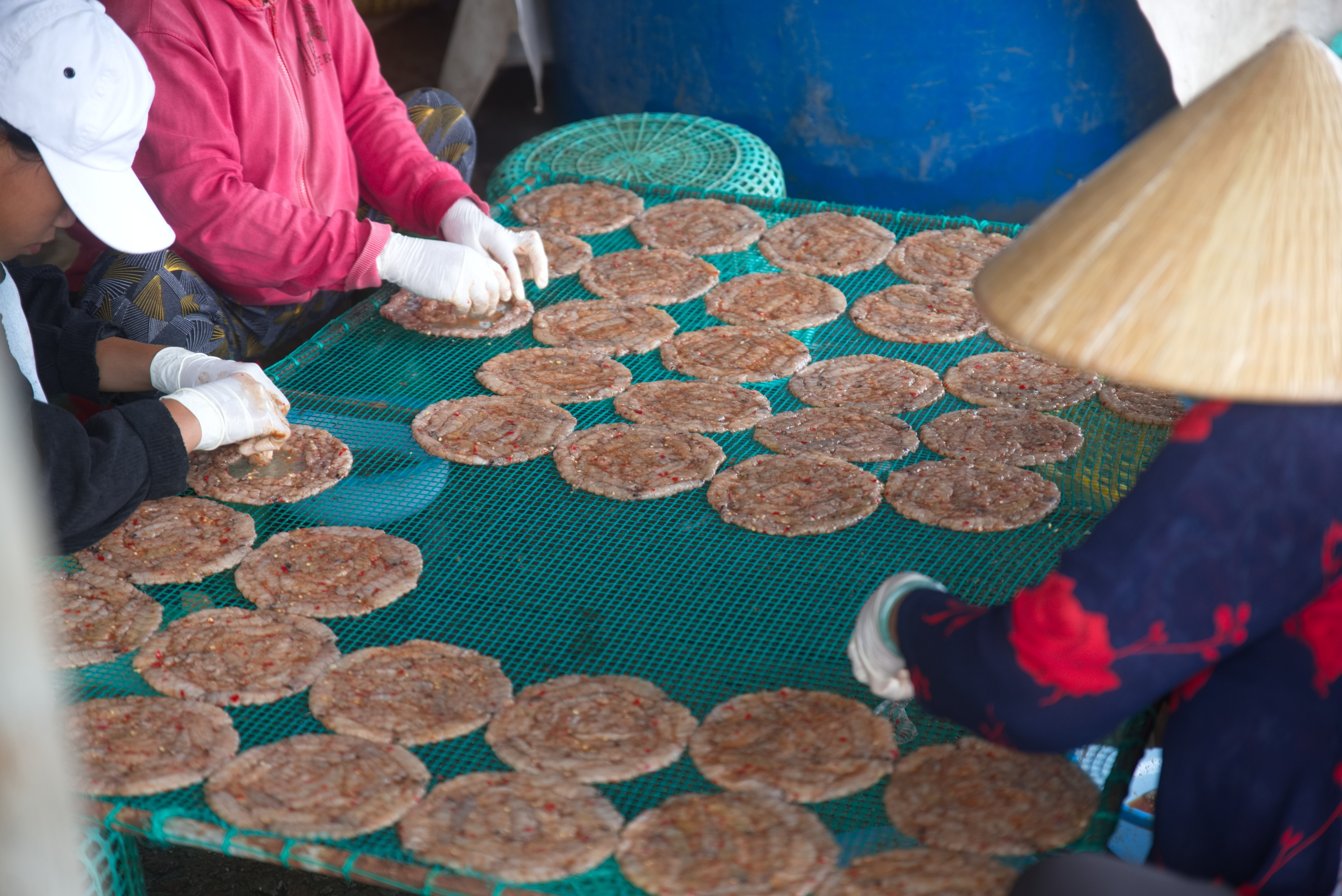
Drying mantis shrimp at Gò Công, Tiền Giang, Việt Nam

In Cantonese cuisine, the mantis shrimp is known as "urinating shrimp" (Chinese: 瀨尿蝦; pinyin: lài niào xiā; Jyutping: laai6 niu6 haa1) because of their tendency to shoot a jet of water when picked up. After cooking, their flesh is closer to that of lobsters than that of shrimp, and like lobsters, their shells are quite hard and require some pressure to crack. One common preparation is first deep-frying, then stir-frying with garlic and chili peppers. They may also be boiled or steamed.

In the Mediterranean countries, the mantis shrimp Squilla mantis is a common seafood, especially on the Adriatic coasts (canocchia) and the Gulf of Cádiz (galera).

In the Philippines, the mantis shrimp is known as tatampal, hipong-dapa, pitik-pitik, pilantik, or alupihang-dagat, and is cooked and eaten like any other shrimp.

In Kiribati, mantis shrimp called te waro in Gilbertese are abundant and are eaten boiled. In Hawaii, some mantis shrimp have grown unusually large in the contaminated water of the Grand Ala Wai Canal in Waikiki. The dangers normally associated with consuming seafood caught in contaminated waters are present in these mantis shrimp.

== Aquaria ==
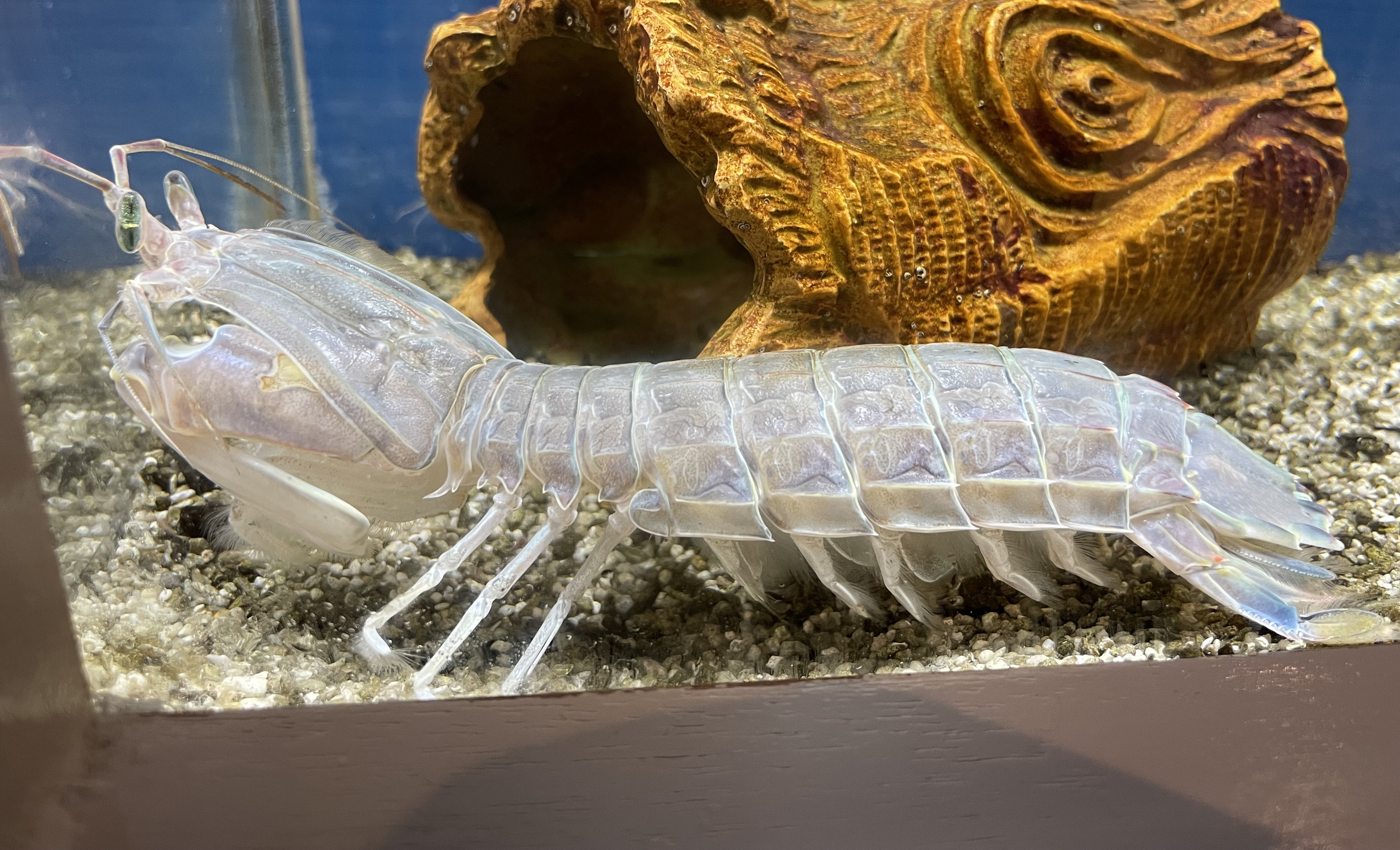
Harpiosquilla harpax in an aquarium

Some saltwater aquarists keep stomatopods in captivity. The peacock mantis is especially colourful and desired in the trade.

While some aquarists value mantis shrimp, others consider them harmful pests, because they are voracious predators, eating other desirable inhabitants of the tank. Additionally, some rock-burrowing species can do more damage to live rock than the fishkeeper would prefer.

The live rock with mantis shrimp burrows is considered useful by some in the marine aquarium trade and is often collected. A piece of live rock not uncommonly conveys a live mantis shrimp into an aquarium. Once inside the tank, it may feed on fish and other inhabitants, and is notoriously difficult to catch when established in a well-stocked tank. While there are accounts of this shrimp breaking glass tanks, they are rare and are usually the result of the shrimp being kept in too small a tank. While stomatopods do not eat coral, smashers can damage it if they try to make a home within it.

== See also ==
- Alpheidae – Family of crustacean possessing asymmetrical snapping claws
