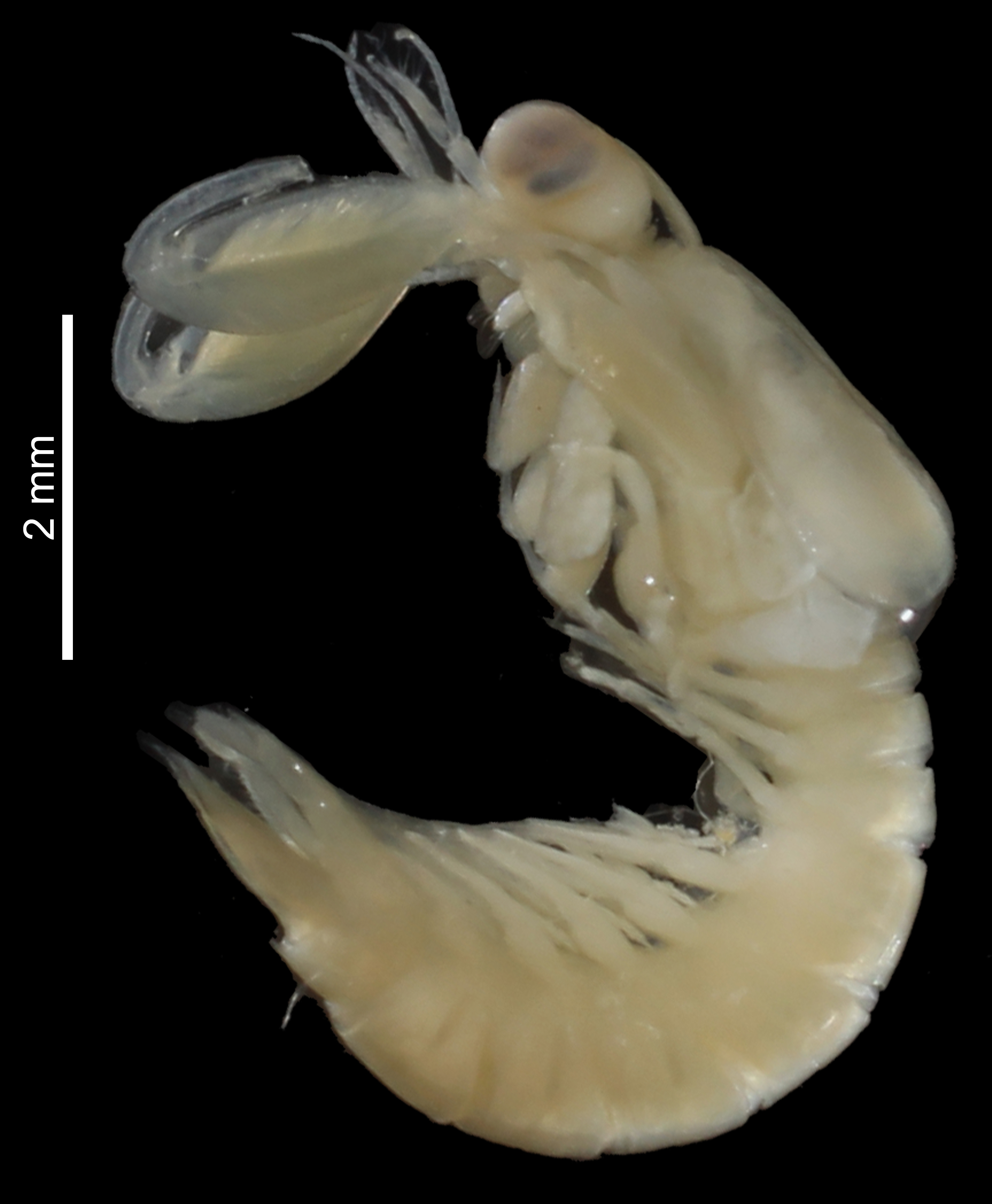

Scientific classification
- Kingdom: Animalia
- Phylum: Arthropoda
- Clade: Pancrustacea
- Class: Malacostraca
- Order: Stomatopoda
- Family: Alainosquillidae
- Genus: Alainosquilla; Moosa, 1991
- Species: A. foresti

Binomial name
- Alainosquilla foresti Moosa, 1991

= Alainosquilla =

Monotypic genus of crustaceans

Alainosquilla is a monotypic genus of crustaceans belonging to the monotypic family Alainosquillidae. The only species is Alainosquilla foresti.

The species is found in Southeastern Asia and Australia.
