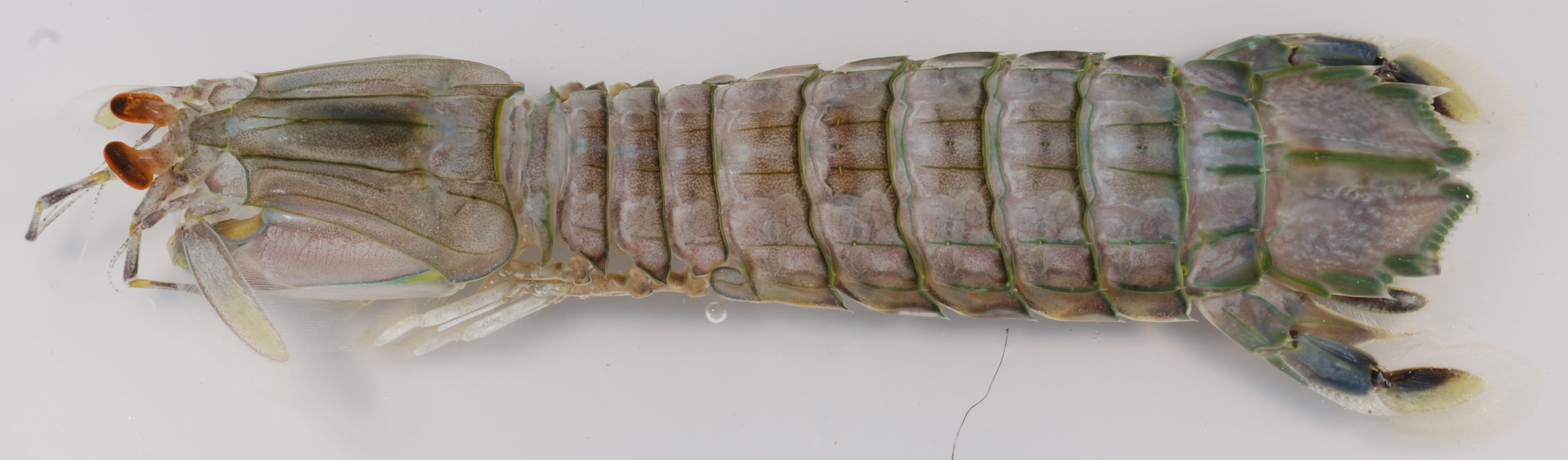

Scientific classification
- Kingdom: Animalia
- Phylum: Arthropoda
- Class: Malacostraca
- Order: Stomatopoda
- Family: Squillidae
- Genus: Squilla
- Species: S. empusa

Binomial name
- Squilla empusa Say 1818

= Squilla empusa =

Species of crustacean

Squilla empusa is a species of mantis shrimp found in coastal areas of the western Atlantic Ocean. It excavates and occupies a burrow in soft sediment from which it emerges, mainly at night, to feed on fish and invertebrate prey.

== Description ==
Squilla empusa grows to a length of about 30 cm (12 in). The head bears stalked compound eyes which can move separately to scan the surroundings. The head and thorax are fused into a cephalothorax which is protected by a shield-like carapace. The thorax has eight segments each bearing a pair of appendages. The front pair are slender and used for grooming whereas the second pair are large, raptorial claws that can slash and spear prey. The third, fourth and fifth pairs each have a flattened terminal segment. They are known as maxillipeds and are used to move food to the mouth. The sixth, seventh and eighth pairs are unspecialised walking legs known as pereiopods. The abdomen has six segments, the front five each having a pair of pleopods (swimming legs). These are biramous (branched) and bear filamentous gills. The sixth segment bears a pair of large uropods which, together with the flexible, six-spiked telson, forms a broad tailfan.

== Distribution ==
Squilla empusa is reported from the eastern seaboard of the United States with a range extending from Cape Cod to the Gulf of Mexico. It is also reported from Brazil and the Mediterranean Sea. It lives in a U-shaped burrow in soft sediment on the seabed at depths from the intertidal zone down to about 150 m (500 ft).

== Behaviour ==
The summer burrow of Squilla empusa consists of a tube with typically two openings connected by a horizontal tunnel some 15 to 50 cm (6 to 20 in) below the surface of the sediment. The horizontal section normally has two bends and a diameter of up to 10 cm (4 in), depending on the size of the occupant. In the more northerly parts of its range, this mantis shrimp excavates a vertical burrow in the winter up to 4.1 m (13 ft) deep. At this depth in the sediment, the oxygen content of the water decreases and the temperature rises. This behavioural adaptation may enable Squilla empusa to inhabit locations where the water temperature falls too low in winter for it otherwise to survive.

Two main methods of burrowing are employed. A vigorous fanning action of the pleopods causes particles of sediment to become suspended and the current produced pushes the plume backwards past the telson. Using this method, an animal can create a depression as large as itself within two minutes. It then turns round and use its maxillipeds to form a basket with which it carries lumps of sediment away from the excavation. This is a slower process but sustainable for a longer period. Further burrowing creates the typical tunnel with one or more openings, and this is frequently remodelled, often in the course of a few hours. Squilla empusa can dig to a depth of 20 cm (8 in) in less than an hour. When the animal is inside the burrow it sometimes uses its maxillipeds to create a current of water flowing through. This species is territorial and will defend its burrow from other mantis shrimps.

Squilla empusa is mainly nocturnal and feeds on fish, shrimps, crabs, krill, worms, molluscs and other mantis shrimps. The raptorial claws are unfolded with great rapidity to spear, slash and immobilise the prey, which is brought back inside the burrow when caught.
