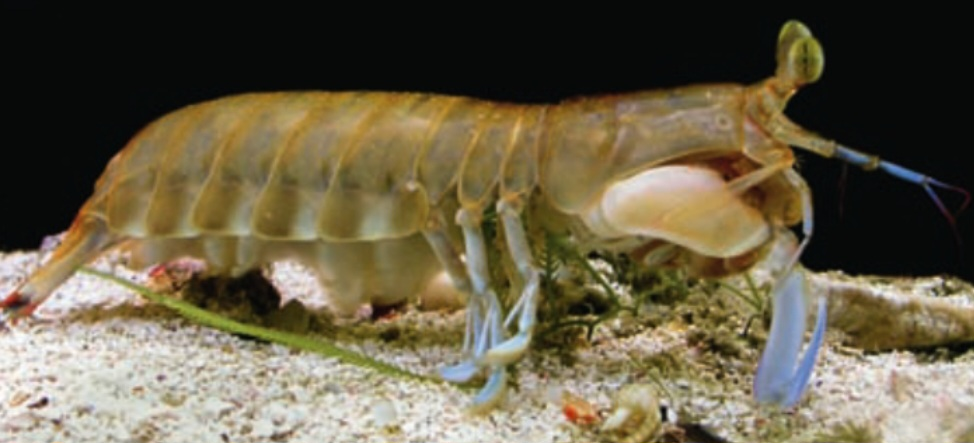

Scientific classification
- Kingdom: Animalia
- Phylum: Arthropoda
- Class: Malacostraca
- Order: Stomatopoda
- Family: Hemisquillidae
- Genus: Hemisquilla
- Species: H. australiensis

Binomial name
- Hemisquilla australiensis Stephenson, 1967

Synonyms
- Hemisquilla ensigera australiensis Stephenson, 1967

= Hemisquilla australiensis =

Species of mantis shrimp

Hemisquilla australiensis is a species of mantis shrimp native to Australia and also found in New Zealand.

== Etymology ==
The genus name Hemisquilla comes from Ancient Greek ἡμι- (hēmi-), meaning 'half', and Latin squilla, meaning 'a kind of shrimp'. The specific epithet australiensis comes from Australia, and -ensis, meaning 'from a place'.
