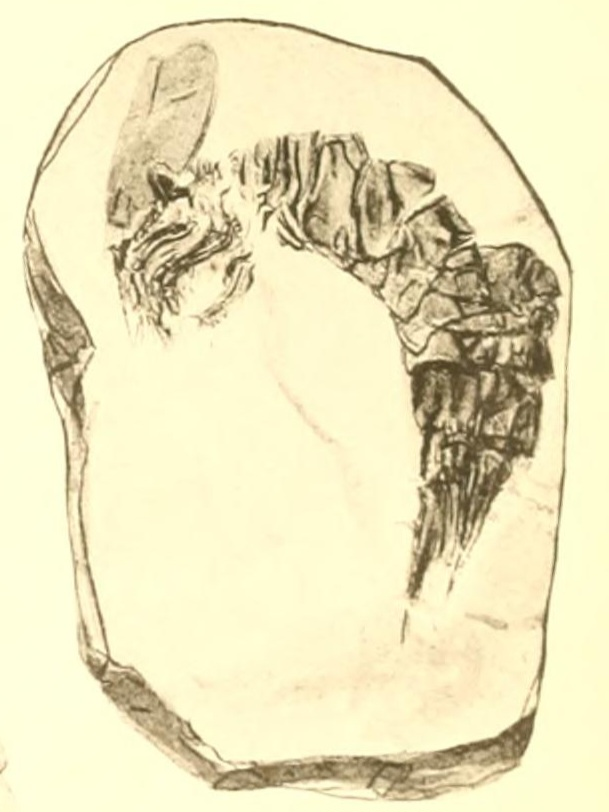
- Illustration of a fossil of B. elegans

Scientific classification
- Kingdom: Animalia
- Phylum: Arthropoda
- Clade: Pancrustacea
- Class: Malacostraca
- Order: Stomatopoda
- Family: †Perimecturidae
- Genus: †Bairdops; Schram, 1979

Type species
- †Perimecturus elegans Peach, 1908

Species
- †B. beargulchensis Schram & Horner, 1978; †B. elegans Peach, 1908

Synonyms
- synonyms of B. elegans: Perimecturus elegans Peach, 1908; Perimecturus ensifer Peach, 1908

= Bairdops =

Bairdops Temporal range: Tournaisian–Serpukhovian

Fossil genus of mantis shrimp

Bairdops is an extinct genus of mantis shrimp that lived during the Early Carboniferous period in what is now Scotland and the United States. Two named species are currently assigned to it. The type species, B. elegans, has been collected from several Dinantian-aged localities in Scotland, and was first described in 1908 by British geologist Ben Peach as a species of Perimecturus. The generic name was coined decades later in 1979 by American paleontologist Frederick Schram, and honors William Baird. A later species, B. beargulchensis, was named in 1978 after the Serpukhovian-aged Bear Gulch Limestone of Montana where it was discovered. The two species were originally deemed close relatives based on their physical similarities, but several cladistic analyses published since 1998 have suggested the genus may be polyphyletic.

A carnivore like all mantis shrimps, Bairdops handled food with its raptorial thoracic appendages and has been proposed to either predominantly be a scavenger or a predator of crustaceans and small fish. Early mantis shrimps like such as this genus would have been unable to capture prey while standing on the seabed like their modern counterparts and instead are believed to have been benthopelagic, perhaps grabbing prey from above while swimming just over the bottom. Members of this genus reached a moderate size, with B. beargulchensis having a carapace length of 1.7–2.6 cm (0.67–1.02 in) and a total abdomen length of 3.19–5.30 cm (1.26–2.09 in), while the slightly smaller B. elegans reached a carapace length of 0.76–2.93 cm (0.30–1.15 in) and a total abdomen length of 1.50–5.03 cm (0.59–1.98 in).

Because the various sites from which B. elegans fossils have been collected represent a wide range of habitats including marine environments, brackish bays and even a lake, this species is believed to have been tolerant of a wide salinity range. Its preferred habitat appears to be marine since most of its specimens originate from such a setting, and it only lived in the aforementioned lake when the water was brackish, disappearing from it after its salinity dropped below the animal's tolerance range. B. beargulchensis is only known to have inhabited the marine bay where the Bear Gulch Limestone was deposited, a location which was 10 to 12 degrees north of the equator and had a monsoon climate.

== Discovery and naming ==
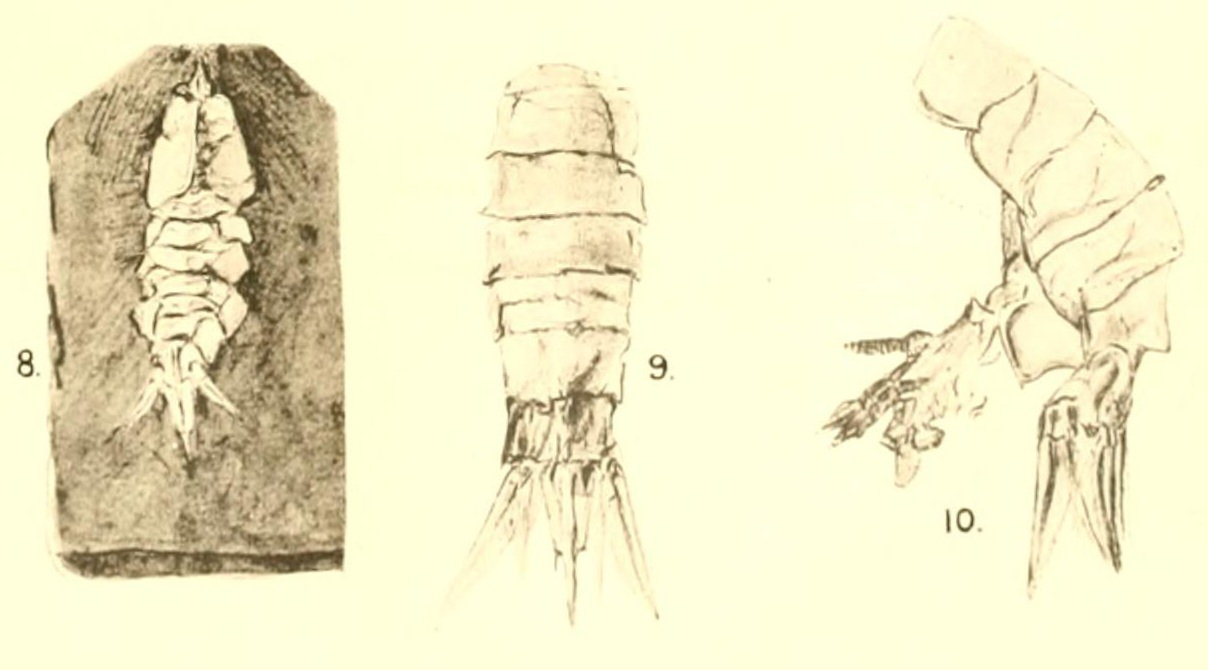
Fossils of Bairdops elegans as illustrated in 1908, originally labelled as Perimecturus ensifer

The fossilized remains of Bairdops have been discovered decades prior to the establishment of the genus. In 1908, Ben Peach became the first to study specimens of this animal, which were collected in Scotland by A. Macconochie. However, Peach believed they represented members of Perimecturus, another genus of early stomatopods. He erected the species Perimecturus elegans based on remains found near the River Esk in Glencartholm. In addition, he also erected the species Perimecturus ensifer from fossils found in Liddel Water, Newcastleton and Glencartholm.

In 1979, Frederick Schram found that P. elegans and P. ensifer were indistinguishable from each other, thus the latter was declared as a junior synonym of the former. He also noted that the tail fan, body shape and size of this species differed significantly from what is seen in other species of Perimecturus. Schram therefore erected the genus Bairdops with P. elegans as the type species, which was subsequently renamed as Bairdops elegans, and the specimen GSE 5879 was designated as the lectotype of this species. The generic name honors William Baird, the Assistant Curator of the fossil invertebrate collection at the Royal Scottish museum.

Additionally, Schram described a second species of Bairdops in 1978 which he named B. beargulchensis. The specific name refers to the Bear Gulch Limestone in Fergus County, Montana, where the holotype (UM 6217) was collected. Factor and Feldman (1985) declared this species to be a junior synonym of Tyrannophontes theridion. However, a later study by Jenner et al. (1997) found that B. beargulchensis is most similar to B. elegans, thus revalidating B. beargulchensis. They also found that some of the fossils in Schram's original sample represent a separate species they named Tyrannophontes acanthocercus (now moved to the genus Daidal), and that this is likely responsible for the earlier study finding B. beargulchensis similar to Tyrannophontes.

== Description ==
Bairdops is a crustacean of moderate size, with B. elegans having a carapace length of 0.76–2.93 cm (0.30–1.15 in) and a total abdomen length of 1.50–5.03 cm (0.59–1.98 in). B. beargulchensis is slightly larger and more robust, with a carapace ranging from 1.7–2.6 cm (0.67–1.02 in) and a total abdomen length of 3.19–5.30 cm (1.26–2.09 in).

The rostrum is about a third the length of the carapace and is spatula-like in shape, with a tapering, pointed tip and a wide base. The antennae are not well preserved, but it is known the scaphocerite (exopod of the antenna) is very large. A pair of large and circular compound eyes are present on the head. The large, elongated carapace covers the entire thorax in B. elegans, whereas in B. beargulchensis it leaves only the top of the eighth thorax segment exposed. The carapace has a subrectangular shape and a furrow on its edges. This furrow is prominent in B. elegans but very slight in B. beargulchensis. The back margin of the carapace is concave at the top, with its sides extending slightly further and reaching the front of the first abdominal segment.

Pairs of raptorial appendages are attached to the thorax, though it is unclear whether there are four or five pairs of these. The coxae, ischiomeri and carpi of these appendages are short, whereas the propodi (penultimate segment) and dactyli (final segment) are longer. The longest segment of a raptorial appendage in Bairdops is the basis. Though Schram and Horner (1978) claimed the propodi of B. beargulchensis possessed two rows of spines, this observation was based on specimens now reassigned to Daidal acanthocercus. Propodus spines are currently believed to only be present in B. elegans.

All thoracic segments are shorter than the abdominal segments. The thoracic segments further front possess narrow sternites and are smaller than the sixth to eighth thoracic segments. The abdominal segments decrease in both height and width down the animal's length, and their side margins are rather straight. Moderate furrows are present on the lower margins of each abdominal segment. In B. beargulchensis, the fifth and sixth abdominal segments may possess one or two backward-pointing ridges extending past the back margin of their respective segments, a feature absent in B. elegans.

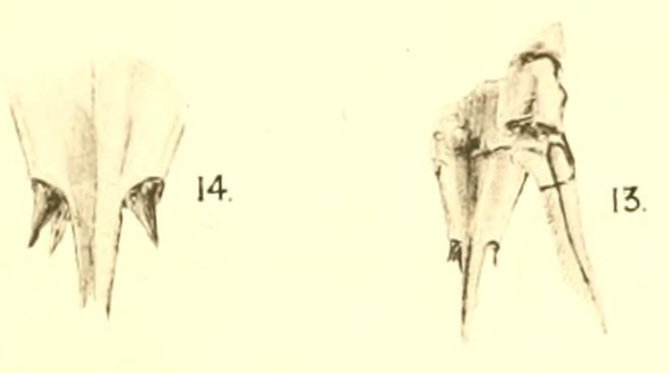
Telson of B. elegans

The somewhat delicate tail fan includes a telson which tapers into a long median spine, while a shorter spine is present on either side of this median spine. Three keels are seen on the telson, with one running down the middle and another on either side of it, which all converge near the end of the telson. The protopod (basal segment) of the uropod has a projection extending over the ramus, while the blade-like exopod is made up of a sclerotised outer part and more membranous inner part.

== Classification ==
Fossil specimens of Bairdops were first assigned to the family Perimecturidae by Ben Peach in 1908, and to this day the genus is still placed within this family. Peach believed Perimecturidae to be intermediate forms between Lophogastridae and Anaspididae, and assigned the family to the currently defunct order Schizopoda. It was not until 1962 that the Perimecturidae family were recognized to be early forms of mantis shrimps, when H. K. Brooks reassigned the family to the order Palaeostomatopoda (currently delisted as a suborder and named Palaeostomatopodea). As cladistic analysis became more widely conducted, the palaeostomatopods were first recovered to be a paraphyletic grouping by Jenner et al. (1998), and this paraphyly was then confirmed by Schram (2007). The paraphyletic use of Palaeostomatopodea is used today for the convenience of referring to the evolutionary grade.

Though B. elegans and B. beargulchensis were initially placed in the same genus due to their overall similarity, the monophyly of the genus has been questioned. Jenner et al. (1998) was the first to propose that Bairdops may be polyphyletic, recovering B. beargulchensis to be closer to Perimecturus than B. elegans. Schram (2007) similarly suggested Bairdops to be polyphyletic, but instead found that B. elegans was the sister taxon to Perimecturus rapax. Haug et al. (2010) recovered B elegans as the second-earliest lineage of mantis shrimps to diverge (with Archaeocaris being the most basal), being a sister taxon to the clade including all other mantis shrimps except Archaeocaris. Smith et al. (2023) conducted a phylogenetic analysis which also supports the idea that Bairdops is polyphyletic, though the family Perimecturidae was found to be monophyletic. Their results are displayed in the cladogram below:

- Stomatopoda
  - †Archaeocaris
    - Archaeocaris vermiformis
    - Archaeocaris graffhami
  - - - †Bairdops elegans
      - †Perimecturus
        - Perimecturus parki
        - Perimecturus rapax
    - †Bairdops beargulchensis
    - - †Daidal pattoni
      - - - - †Daidal schoellmanni
            - †Daidal acanthocercus
          - †Gorgonophontes
            - Gorgonophontes fraiponti
            - Gorgonophontes peleron
        - - †Chabardella spinosa
        - - †Tyrannophontes theridion
          - - †Tyrannophontes gigantion
            - Unipeltata
              - †Triassosculda ahyongi
              - - †Tyrannosculda laurae
                - - †Pseudosculda laevis
                  - - †Archaeosculda phoenicia
                    - - - †Sculda pennata
                        - †Sculda syriaca
                      - - †Ursquilla yehoachi
                        - - †Lysiosquilla nkporoensis
                          - - †Nodosculda fisherorum
                            - Squilla mantis

== Palaeobiology ==
=== Feeding ===
Like all other mantis shrimp species, Bairdops would have been carnivorous, using its raptorial thoracic appendages to handle prey. Clarkson (1985) suggested that small fish and the crustacean Belotelson were among the prey of B. elegans. Unlike modern mantis shrimps of the suborder Unipeltata, the raptorial appendages of palaeostomatopods like Bairdops lack a click-joint mechanism formed by a specialized joint and its associated muscles. Such a mechanism is what allows modern mantis shrimps to quickly extend the second pair of thoracic appendages to capture prey. Lacking this, the appendages of Bairdops are more similar to the smaller, third to fifth pairs of thoracic appendages in unipeltatans used to manipulate prey after capture. Jenner et al. (1998) thus proposed that Bairdops was an opportunistic scavenger and specialized in dead food. In contrast, Haug and Haug (2021) suggested that since their appendage morphology would not allow them to capture prey from the seabed, early mantis shrimps would instead have been benthopelagic predators, possibly capturing prey from above while swimming just above the bottom. This is unlike modern mantis shrimp, which are bottom-dwelling predators as adults, though their larvae are benthopelagic and thus studying them could allow better knowledge of early stomatopods.

=== Salinity tolerance ===
Fossils of Bairdops elegans have been collected from various localities in Scotland representing a wide range of salinities. The species is most abundantly found at Glencartholm, which was a marginal to fully marine environment at the time of deposition, but some specimens are also found at sites representing brackish bays (Newcastleton and the Granton Shrimp Bed). Several remains have even been found at the Foulden Fish Bed, representing an occurrence of the species in a non-marine lake. The range of environments in which B. elegans occurs suggests this species had broad salinity tolerance, though it was most common in marine habitats.

== Palaeoenvironment ==
The geologically oldest known record of Bairdops is represented by remains of B. elegans from the lower part of the Foulden Fish Bed, a site within the Ballagan Formation in Scotland. This locality dates to the Dinantian series, and the lack of definitively marine species in its fossil content suggests the Foulden Fish Bed was a non-marine lake at the time of deposition. This lake would have been near the sea and was susceptible to fluctuations in salinity and water level. As a result, the horizons of the Fish Bed show a reciprocal relationship in the abundance of crustaceans and palaeoniscid fish: the lowest horizon has Bairdops elegans and numerous Belotelson fossils, which abruptly become absent in the horizon directly above while palaeoniscids appear (likely arriving from another lake at a time of higher water levels) and persist to the top of the Bed. In an upper horizon, Belotelson reappears in lower numbers than before. However, Bairdops elegans appears to have only lived in this lake during the deposition of the lowest horizon, when the lake was brackish and had few fish. It was likely extirpated from this area when the water level rose, lowering the salinity beyond its range of tolerance and allowing fish which preyed on it to invade, and failed to recolonize the lake the way Belotelson did.

Fossils of Bairdops elegans are also known from other Dinantian-aged deposits in Scotland. Two localities in which the species occurs, the Granton Shrimp Bed and Newcastleton, represent brackish interdistributary bays. The Granton Shrimp Bed has one of the most diverse Dinantian fossil assemblages of crustaceans in Britain, and has been interpreted to represent periodically exposed mudflats at a low water stand of a lagoon. The sediment was anoxic just under the surface. The most abundant crustacean at the Granton Shrimp Bed is Waterstonella, a small swimming species which has been proposed to be a prey item for Bairdops. Other crustaceans from the site include Crangopsis, Minicaris, Palaemysis, Tealliocaris, Pseudogalathea, Anthracocaris and Eocypridina. Different animal groups such as fish (including Rhadinichthys and a rhizodont), hydrozoans and molluscs are also represented.

The site where the most specimens of B. elegans have been found is the Glencartholm Volcanic Beds, deposited in a nearshore marine environment. This locality has the most marine influence of all sites which have yielded B. elegans remains, and its abundance here may suggests this is the preferred habitat for the species. Bairdops is deemed a common crustacean in this area, as are Belotelson, Anthracocaris, Perimecturus and Anthracophausia, while Crangopsis, Pseudotealliocaris and Sairocaris are even more abundant than the aforementioned taxa. Fish are also well-represented within the Beds, with more than 200 specimens of over 30 species known. Fossils of plants, bivalves, scorpions and xiphosurans have also been found in the area.

The species Bairdops beargulchensis is known only from the Bear Gulch Limestone of Montana, which dates to the Serpukhovian stage of the early Carboniferous period, approximately 324 million years ago. Thus, B. beargulchensis is geologically younger than any known occurrence of B. elegans. During this time, central Montana was located 10 to 12 degrees north of the equator, at the boundary between an arid belt in the north and a tropical belt in the south. The area would have had a monsoonal climate with distinct wet summer and dry winter seasons, comparable to the climate of the modern African Sahel. The Bear Gulch Limestone is interpreted to have been a marine bay oriented from northwest to southeast. An extremely diverse fossil assemblage is known from this site, with numerous types of fish including chondrichthyans (such as petalodonts, holocephalans, symmoriiforms, squatinactids and Thrinacodus), acanthodians, actinopterygians and coelacanths. Invertebrates are also found here, including crustaceans, bivalves, polychaete worms and cephalopods.
