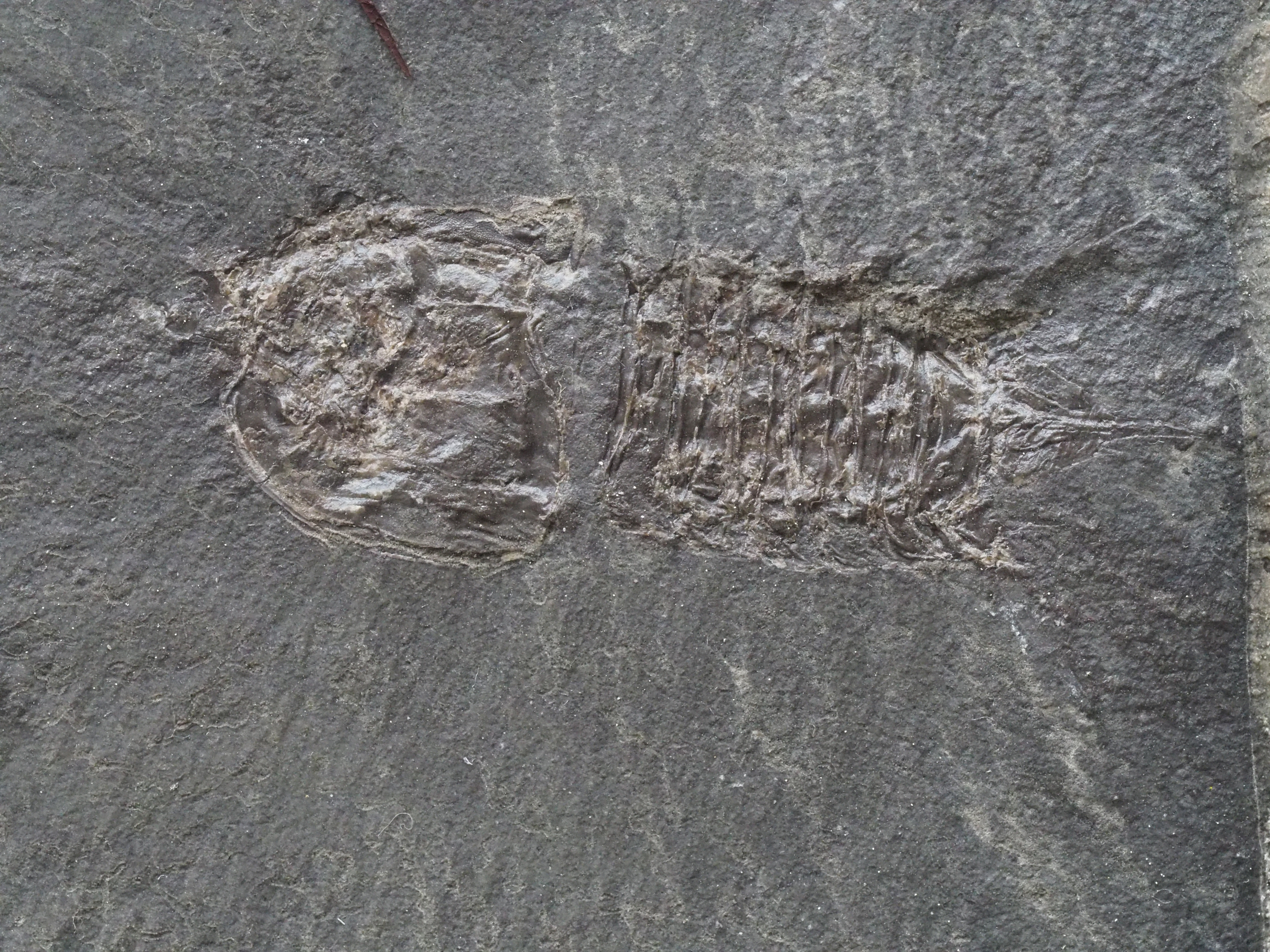
- Fossil of P. rapax from the Bear Gulch Limestone

Scientific classification
- Kingdom: Animalia
- Phylum: Arthropoda
- Clade: Pancrustacea
- Class: Malacostraca
- Order: Stomatopoda
- Family: †Perimecturidae
- Genus: †Perimecturus; Peach, 1908

Type species
- †Anthrapalaemon parki (= †Perimecturus parki) Peach, 1882

Other species
- †P. rapax Schram & Horner, 1978

Synonyms
- Synonyms of Perimecturus: Palaesquilla Peach & Horne, 1903 (nomen nudum); Synonyms of P. parki: Anthrapalaemon parki Peach, 1882; Palaesquilla parki Peach & Horne, 1903 (nomen nudum); Perimecturus communis Peach, 1908; Perimecturus parki duplicicarinatus Peach, 1908; Perimecturus stocki Peach, 1908

= Perimecturus =

Perimecturus Temporal range: Early Carboniferous (Viséan to Serpukhovian), 345–324 Ma

Fossil genus of mantis shrimp

Perimecturus is an extinct genus of mantis shrimp that lived during the Early Carboniferous period in what is now Scotland and the United States. The first known specimens were collected near the River Esk in Glencartholm, Scotland, and the genus was named in 1908 by Ben Peach, making it the second genus of Paleozoic mantis shrimp to be described (only after Archaeocaris). While many species have been classified in the genus since then, taxonomic revisions in the late 20th and 21st centuries have reassigned most of these to different genera, leaving two named species currently assigned to this genus. The type species, P. parki, was first named in 1882 as a species of Anthrapalaemon and is known from the Viséan-aged Glencartholm Volcanic Beds of Scotland. Fossils of a later species, P. rapax, have been found in the Bear Gulch Limestone of Montana and were first described by Frederick Schram.

Unlike other Paleozoic mantis shrimps which had narrow, shrimp-like bodies, Perimecturus had a wide and flattened body more closely resembling that of a lobster. This condition is also seen in modern mantis shrimps, but Perimecturus would have developed this shape separately from them in an example of parallel evolution. Members of this genus had a wide carapace with five ridges, in addition to six other ridges running down the abdomen. The two species differ primarily in the tail fan, with P. rapax having a longer telson spike and lacking the bristles seen in P. parki. In addition, P. parki lacks the serrations on the telson and uropods that P. rapax has. Perimecturus is one of the largest Paleozoic mantis shrimps, with the largest known specimen of P. parki reaching a total length of 15 cm (5.9 in). However, most specimens are notably smaller than this.

Both Perimecturus species lived in fully marine habitats, and are believed to be intolerant of lower salinities. Like all other mantis shrimps, they would have been carnivores that handled prey with their raptorial thoracic appendages. Because the walking appendages are poorly preserved, it remains unclear whether Perimecturus would have been benthopelagic and swam just over the seabed like other early mantis shrimps.

== Discovery and naming ==
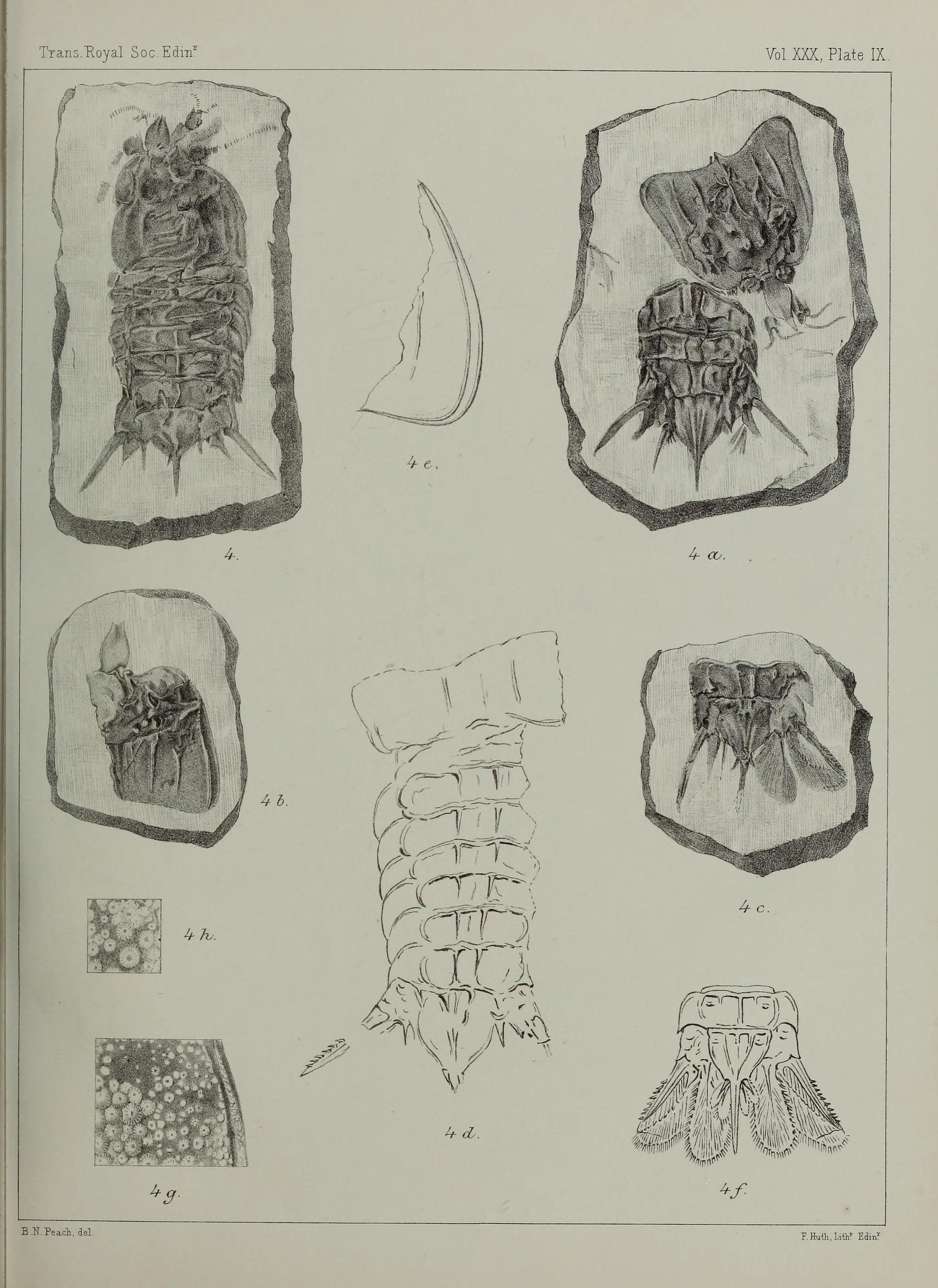
Illustrations of the original Perimecturus parki fossils from Peach's 1882 paper, originally labeled as Anthrapalaemon parki

The first fossil of Perimecturus known to science was discovered by A. Macconochie, with additional specimens found by Walter Park. These specimens were collected near the River Esk in Glencartholm, Scotland, and turned in to the Geological Survey of Scotland. In 1882, British paleontologist Ben Peach became the first person to study these fossils, which he believed represented a new species of Anthrapalaemon, naming it Anthrapalaemon parki after Park. Later, Peach would work alongside J. Horne in 1903 to move this species to a separate genus which they called Palaesquilla, however they did not formally rename it and thus Palaesquilla is deemed a nomen nudum. A formal reassignment would be published by Peach in 1908, in which he erected the new genus Perimecturus with this species (now renamed as Perimecturus parki) as its type species. Furthermore, he also studied several other specimens which he named as a subspecies, P. parki duplicicarinatus, and additional species which he assigned to the genus, including P. stocki and P. communis.

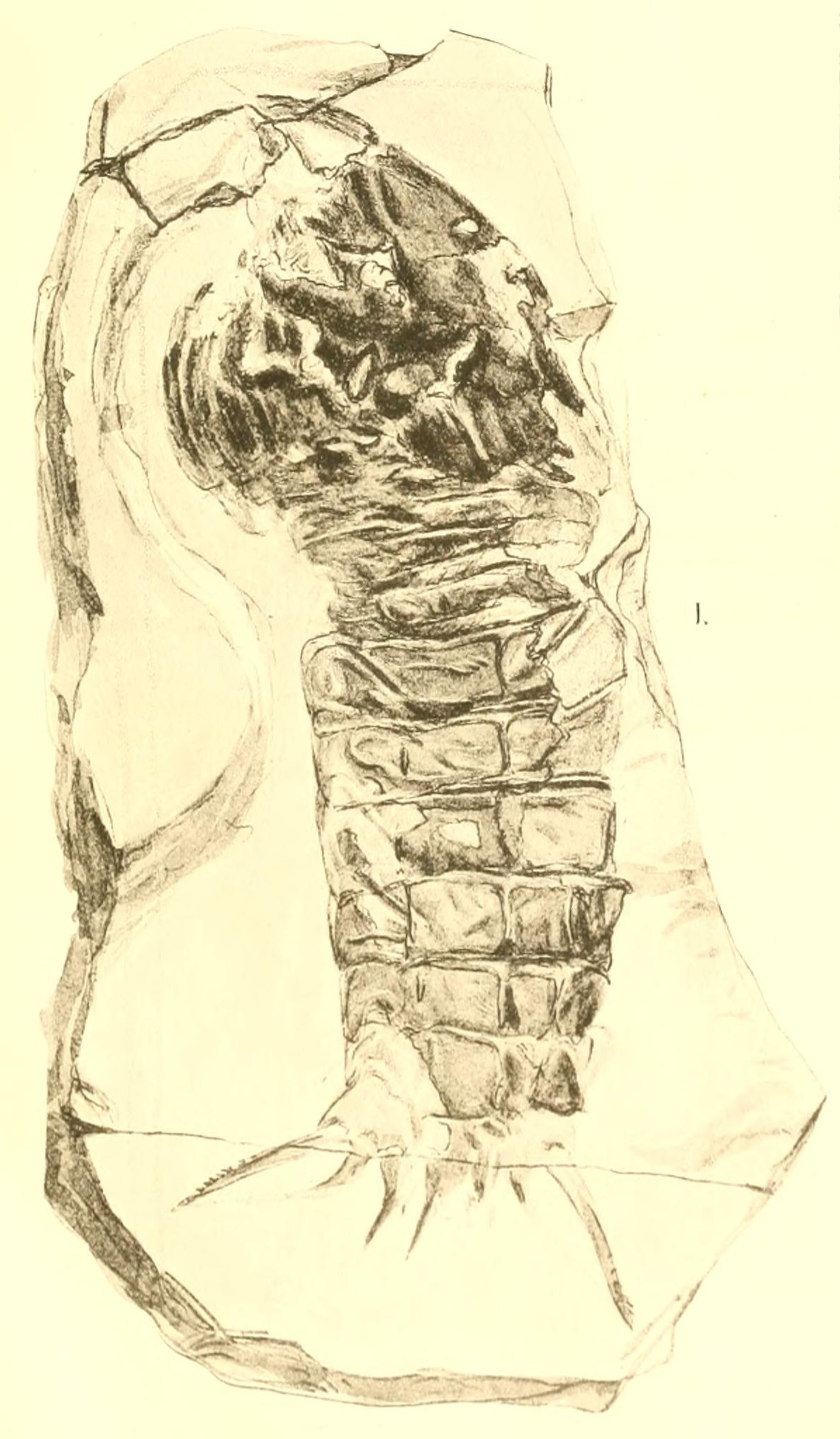
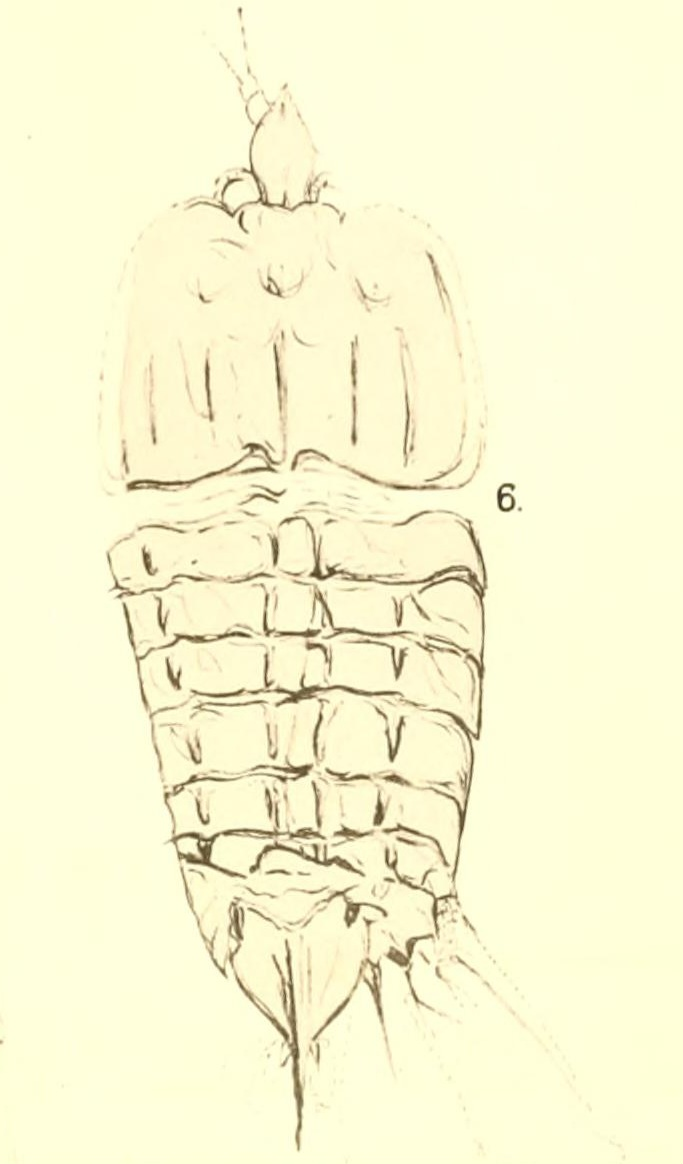
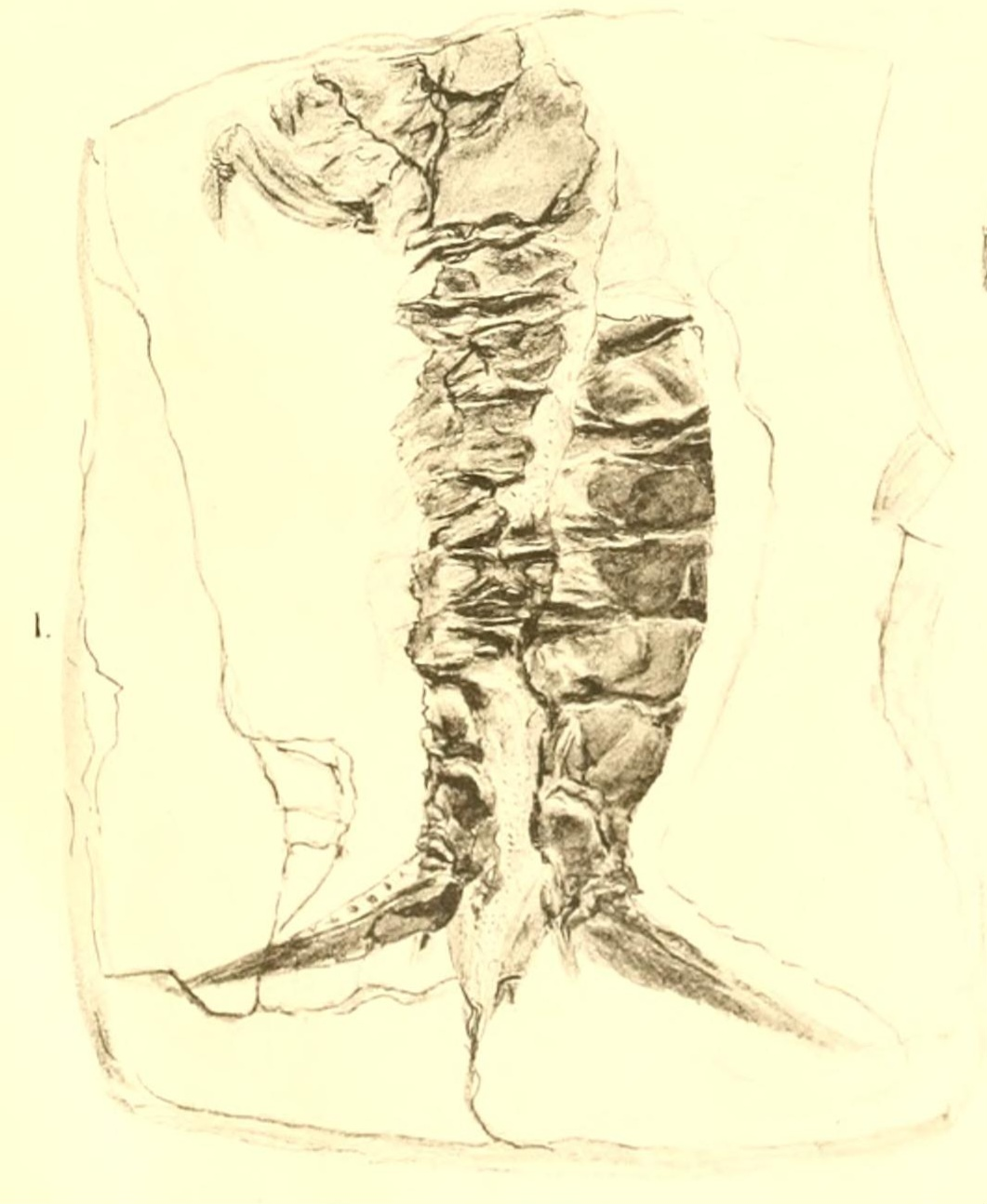
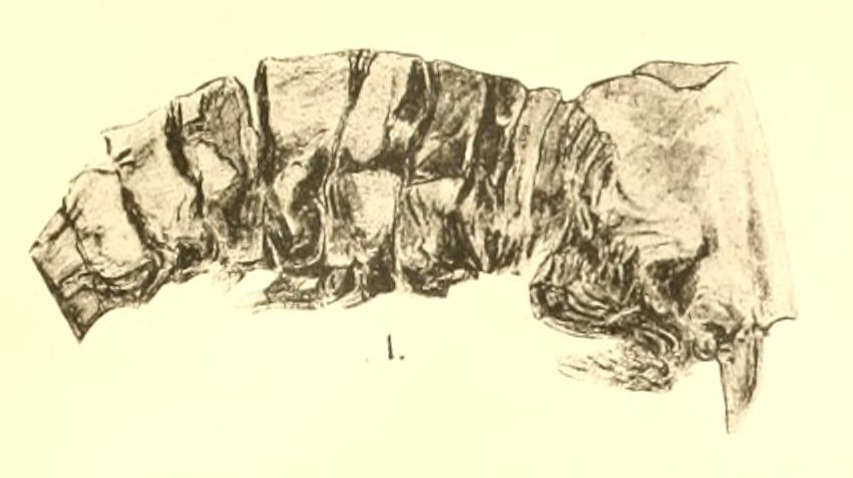
Illustrations of P. parki fossils from Peach's 1908 paper, originally named as (in clockwise order from the top left) P. parki, P. parki duplicicarinatus, P. communis, and P. stocki respectively

In 1979, a review of the Carboniferous-aged malacostracans of Britain written by American paleontologist Frederick Schram was published. The review found that P. parki was the only valid species of Perimecturus named by Peach, and that P. p. duplicicarinatus (which Schram misspelled as duplicarinatus), P. stocki and P. communis were all junior synonyms of it. The specimen GSE 5896 was designated as the lectotype of this species. Schram stated that Peach's idea of the fossils as separate species was due to incorrect interpretation of the fossils preserved in different modes: the original P. parki holotype showed the animal in a top-down view, the P. p. duplicicarinatus specimen clearly preserved the longitudinal ridges, the P. stocki fossil is an individual in a slanted angle and the P. communis remains are displayed from the side.

A second species of Perimecturus was erected by Schram in 1978 and named P. rapax, the specific name being a Latin word meaning "to grasp" (in reference to the animal's predatory lifestyle and raptorial appendages). The holotype for this species, UM 6141, is held in the collection of the University of Montana and was discovered in the Bear Gulch Limestone of Fergus County, Montana. In 1985, David Factor and Rodney Feldmann published a redescription of P. rapax, after a detailed reanalysis of the fossils which found that Schram had misinterpreted some of their features.

=== Reassigned species ===
Because it was the second Paleozoic mantis shrimp genus to be named (after Archaeocaris, which was named in 1872 but only recognized as one in 1962), numerous species have been assigned to Perimecturus before better knowledge of early mantis shrimps was developed. The following species were formerly placed in Perimecturus but have since been moved to other genera:

- P. elegans was erected in 1908 by Peach based on fossils from the River Esk, Scotland. In 1979, Schram established the genus Bairdops to which this species was reassigned and became the type species of.
- P. ensifer was named by Peach in 1908 from remains found in the Scottish localities of Liddel Water, Newcastleton and Glencartholm. Schram declared it to be a junior synonym of Bairdops elegans in 1979.
- P. pattoni was described by Peach in 1908 based on a single fossil from the Top Hosie Limestone of the Lower Limestone Formation near East Kilbride, Scotland. It was first noted by Schram in 1979 to not properly belong to Perimecturus, and in 2007 he moved it to the genus Daidal.
- P. fraiponti was described in 1922 by Belgian carcinologist and paleontologist Victor van Straelen from pyritized remains found near Liège, Belgium. It was moved to the genus Gorgonophontes by German paleontologist Lothar Schöllmann in 2004.

== Description ==
The body of Perimecturus is distinctively flattened, appearing wide and almost rectangular when viewed from above, and its abdomen could be held straight. This makes its body partly lobster-like, differing from other Paleozoic mantis shrimps which have narrower, shrimp-like bodies with curved abdomens. While modern mantis shrimps also have a body shape more comparable to lobsters than to shrimp, Perimecturus would have evolved such an appearance separately from them, representing an example of parallel evolution. With the largest specimen (GSE 5897) measuring 15 cm (5.9 in) in total length, P. parki is among the biggest Paleozoic mantis shrimps, though most specimens measure just 1.28–3.37 cm (0.50–1.33 in) in carapace length and 1.50–4.65 cm (0.59–1.83 in) in abdomen length. P. rapax is a smaller species, reaching only 1.22–2.59 cm (0.48–1.02 in) in carapace length and 1.45–2.83 cm (0.57–1.11 in) in abdomen length.

The rostrum is very broad and blunt, with a rounded tip in P. rapax, though it is slightly more pointed in P. parki. The antennae are short and flagellated, each with an elongated and pointed scaphocerite (exopod of the antenna). The compound eyes are stalked and oval in shape. The large, subrectangular carapace covers the entire thorax and has a marked furrow all around its margins, as well as short keels extending from the base of the antennae. The carapace has five prominent ridges (one down the middle of the carapace and two on either side) stretching across its latter half. Though Schram (1978) claims P. parki has only four such ridges and P. rapax has only three, detailed reanalysis by Factor and Feldmann (1985) and Jenner et al. (1998) confirms both species actually have five.

Like all mantis shrimps, Perimecturus had raptorial appendages attached to the thorax. Because the raptorial appendages of this genus are rather short and often retracted to overlap with each other, study of them has been difficult and their features often cannot be discerned. However, some P. parki specimens have shown that most segments of these appendages are approximately equal in length, except the fourth segment from the distal end which is notably shorter.

Little is known about the thorax as it is completely covered by the carapace, though its hind segments at least are not fused with it. The abdomen is made up of six segments, each approximately the same length. A small backward-pointing spike is present at the edges of every abdominal segment. Schram (1978) wrongly stated that P. parki and P. rapax had four and three abdominal ridges respectively, believing they lined up with the carapace ridges. Reanalysis has found that both species have six keels on each abdominal segment, forming six continuous ridges down the abdomen (two median ridges and four lateral ridges). The ridges run parallel to each other in the first four segments and begin to converge with each other at the fifth segment. Two small wart-like bumps are present on each abdominal segment, one located in each space between the median ridges and innermost lateral ridges.

While both species have biramous (two-branched) uropods, spines near the end of the outer margin of the uropodal exopod (outer branch), a subtriangular telson that tapers into a pointed spike at the end and small furcae (spikes forming the tail fork) flanking the base of this spike, other aspects of the tail fan differs greatly between the two Perimecturus species. In P. parki, this spike is less than half the length of the telson base, with delicate bristles around the edges of the telson and uropods. The exopod of the uropod and the hind part of the telson base are smooth. Meanwhile, the telson spike of P. rapax is over half the length of the telson base, no bristles are present on the tail fan, the outer margin of the uropodal exopod is serrated, and the telson is serrated near the furcae.

== Classification ==
Perimecturus gives its name to the family Perimecturidae, of which it is the type genus. This family was established by Ben Peach in 1908, who placed it within the now defunct order Schizopoda, believing that perimecturids were intermediate forms between Lophogastridae and Anaspididae. In 1962, the Perimecturidae family was first recognized as a group of early mantis shrimps by H. K. Brooks, reassigning it to the order Palaeostomatopoda (now delisted as a suborder and named Palaeostomatopodea). With the advent of cladistic analyses, the palaeostomatopods as traditionally construed were first recovered as a paraphyletic grouping by Jenner et al. (1998), a finding later confirmed by Schram (2007). Currently, Palaeostomatopodea is still used in a paraphyletic sense to refer to the evolutionary grade.

Several studies of conducted phylogenetic analyses on fossil mantis shrimps. While Jenner et al. (1998) found the genus to be monophyletic, some other authors have questioned its monophyly. Schram (2007) and Haug et al. (2010) both recovered Perimecturus to be paraphyletic, the former finding P. rapax to be the sister taxon to Bairdops elegans within a monophyletic family Perimecturidae, while the latter suggests the family is a paraphyletic grade in which P. parki is the sister taxon to all other mantis shrimps except Archaeocaris and Bairdops. On the other hand, Smith et al. (2023) supports the idea that both Perimecturus and Perimecturidae are monophyletic. Their results are displayed in the cladogram below:

- Stomatopoda
  - †Archaeocaris
    - Archaeocaris vermiformis
    - Archaeocaris graffhami
  - - - †Bairdops elegans
      - †Perimecturus
        - Perimecturus parki
        - Perimecturus rapax
    - †Bairdops beargulchensis
    - - †Daidal pattoni
      - - - - †Daidal schoellmanni
            - †Daidal acanthocercus
          - †Gorgonophontes
            - Gorgonophontes fraiponti
            - Gorgonophontes peleron
        - - †Chabardella spinosa
        - - †Tyrannophontes theridion
          - - †Tyrannophontes gigantion
            - Unipeltata
              - †Triassosculda ahyongi
              - - †Tyrannosculda laurae
                - - †Pseudosculda laevis
                  - - †Archaeosculda phoenicia
                    - - - †Sculda pennata
                        - †Sculda syriaca
                      - - †Ursquilla yehoachi
                        - - †Lysiosquilla nkporoensis
                          - - †Nodosculda fisherorum
                            - Squilla mantis

== Paleobiology ==
Possessing raptorial appendages on its thorax for grabbing prey like all other mantis shrimps, Perimecturus is believed to have occupied a low trophic level as an active carnivore in its habitat. It was proposed by Jenner et al. (1998) that palaeostomatopods like Perimecturus were scavengers that handled mostly dead prey since their raptorial appendages are small compared to those of extant mantis shrimps in the order Unipeltata, instead being closer in shape to the third to fifth pairs of thoracic appendages used by unipeltatans to manipulate food after it is caught. In addition, the appendages of palaeostomatopods lack the click-joint mechanism seen in unipeltatans, which is formed by a specialized joint and muscles and allows them to extend quickly and catch prey. Contrary to this, Haug and Haug (2021) suggest that at least some early mantis shrimps (namely Tyrannosculda, Tyrannophontes and Gorgonophontes) had posterior thoracic appendages (i.e. the walking appendages) which were incapable of the wide stance needed to attack prey from the seabed. Therefore, they proposed that these early forms were benthopelagic predators that grabbed prey from above while swimming just over the seabed, unlike modern mantis shrimps which are bottom-dwelling. However, because the walking appendages of Perimecturus are not well-preserved, it remains unclear whether this genus would have also had such a lifestyle.

== Paleoenvironment ==
Based on the fact that both species are known exclusively from marine deposits, Perimecturus is believed to have been a fully marine animal with no adaptation towards lower salinity (unlike the related Bairdops which could tolerate a wider range of salinities). Remains of P. parki have only been collected from the Glencartholm Volcanic Beds, a site in Scotland that dates back to the Viséan stage of the Early Carboniferous period (around 345 million years ago), making it the older of the two known Perimecturus species. The Beds were deposited in a nearshore to fully marine environment, and P. parki is a commonly found crustacean in this locality, as are Bairdops, Anthracocaris, Belotelson and Anthracophausia. The most abundant crustaceans found at this site are Crangopsis, Pseudotealliocaris and Sairocaris, being known from even more specimens than the aforementioned genera. Aside from crustaceans, fossils of other organisms are also known from the Beds. Fish are some of the most numerous, with over 200 specimens representing more than 30 species found in the area. Remains of plants, bivalves, xiphosurans and scorpions are also known from the deposits.

All known specimens of P. rapax originate from the Bear Gulch Limestone in Montana, which was deposited around 324 million years ago during the Serpukhovian stage of the Carboniferous period. This site is believed to have been a marine bay oriented from northwest to southeast, and would have been located 10 to 12 degrees north of the equator. The bay was positioned at the boundary between a tropical belt in the south and an arid belt in the north, and had a monsoonal climate like that of the modern African Sahel with distinct wet summer and dry winter seasons. A very high fossil diversity is recorded from the Bear Gulch Limestone, with some of the most famous fossils being the many types of chondrichthyan fish (including petalodonts, holocephalans, symmoriiforms, Squatinactis and Thrinacodus) that make up close to 60% of the known fish species diversity. Other types of fish like actinopterygians, coelacanths and acanthodians are also known from this site, with the coelacanths being the most abundant. Invertebrates represented in the area include various crustaceans, polychaete worms, cephalopods and bivalves.
