= 1978 in paleontology =

Paleontology, palaeontology or palæontology (from Greek: paleo, "ancient"; ontos, "being"; and logos, "knowledge") is the study of prehistoric life forms on Earth through the examination of plant and animal fossils. This includes the study of body fossils, tracks (ichnites), burrows, cast-off parts, fossilised faeces (coprolites), palynomorphs and chemical residues. Because mankind has encountered fossils for millennia, paleontology has a long history both before and after becoming formalized as a science. This article records significant discoveries and events related to paleontology that occurred in the year 1978.

== Expeditions, field work, and fossil discoveries ==
- A paleoanthropological team led by Mary Leakey found 3.5 million year old human footprints.
- Baby hadrosaurs were discovered in the Two Medicine Formation.

== Cnidarians ==
Maurits Lindström, described the earliest known octocoral in Sweden shifting the first known appearance from the Cretaceous to the Ordovician.

== Arthropods ==
=== Newly named crustaceans ===
Name	Novelty	Status	Authors	Age	Type locality	Location	Notes	Images
Aenigmacaris	Gen et sp nov	Valid	Schram & Horner	Serpukhovian	Bear Gulch Limestone	United States; Montana	An aeschronectid, type species is A. cornigerum	Aenigmacaris
Bairdops beargulchensis	Sp nov	Valid	Schram & Horner	Serpukhovian	Bear Gulch Limestone	United States; Montana	An early mantis shrimp	
Dithyrocaris rolfei	Sp nov	Valid	Schram & Horner	Serpukhovian	Bear Gulch Limestone	United States; Montana	A phyllocarid	
Perimecturus rapax	Sp nov	Valid	Schram & Horner	Serpukhovian	Bear Gulch Limestone	United States; Montana	An early mantis shrimp	Perimecturus rapax
Sairocaris centurion	Sp nov	Valid	Schram & Horner	Serpukhovian	Bear Gulch Limestone	United States; Montana	A sairocaridid	

== Fish ==
=== Newly named Ray-finned fish ===
Name	Novelty	Status	Authors	Age	Type locality	Location	Notes	Images
Eohiodon woodruffi	Sp nov	jr synonym	Wilson	Ypresian	Klondike Mountain Formation	United States; Washington	A mooneye, Moved to Hiodon woodruffi in 2008	Hiodon woodruffi

== Dinosaurs ==
=== Newly named dinosaurs ===
Data courtesy of George Olshevsky's dinosaur genera list.

Name	Novelty	Status	Authors	Age	Type locality	Location	Notes	Images
"Amtosaurus"	Gen nov	Nomen dubium.	Kurzanov		Tumanova			
"Coloradia"	Gen et sp nov	jr homonym	Bonaparte				Preoccupied by Blake 1863. Renamed Coloradisaurus.	
Lesothosaurus	Gen et sp nov	Valid	Galton	Early Jurassic		Lesotho	Possible junior synonym of Fabrosaurus.	Lesothosaurus
Micropachycephalosaurus	Gen nov	Valid	Dong			China	A pachycephalosaur.	Micropachycephalosaurus
Ohmdenosaurus		Valid	Wild			Germany		
"Roccosaurus"		Nomen nudum.	van Heerden vide: Anderson & Cruickshank				Junior synonym of Melanorosaurus.	
Saurornitholestes	Gen et sp nov	Valid	Sues	Campanian	Judith River Formation	Canada (Alberta	A North Polar Dromaeosaur.	Saurornitholestes
Yangchuanosaurus	Gen et sp nov	Valid	Zhiming, Chang, Li, & Zhou			China	A carnosaur	Yangchuanosaurus

=== General research ===
- Peter M. Galton published a paper on Fabrosauridae, including redescribing Fabrosaurus, Echinodon and Nanosaurus along with naming Lesothosaurus.

== Birds ==
Name	Novelty	Status	Authors	Age	Unit	Location	Notes	Images
Aldabranas cabri	Gen. nov. et Sp. nov.	Valid	Colin J. O. Harrison Cyril A. Walker	Late Pleistocene	Aldabra Atoll	Seychelles	An Anatidae, this is the type species of the new genus.	
Anser eldaricus	Sp. nov.	Valid	Nikolaj I. Burchak-Abramovich D. V. Gadzyev	Pliocene	Late Sarmantian	Soviet Union (Now Azerbaijan)	An Anatidae.	
Apus baranensis	Sp. nov.	Valid	Dénes Jánossy	Late Pliocene	MN 16a; MN 17	Hungary; Bulgaria	An Apodidae.	
Chaetura baconica	Sp. nov.	Valid	Dénes Jánossy	Late Miocene	MN 11-12	Hungary	An Apodidae.	
"Gallus" europaeus	Sp. nov.	Valid ?	Colin J. O. Harrison	Middle Pleistocene	MQ 2A	UK	A Phasianidae. The taxonomic status of this species should be reevaluated. There is no evidence, that it belongs to the genus Gallus Brisson.	
Gavia brodkorbi	Sp. nov.	Valid	Hildegarde Howard	Late Miocene	Monterey Formation	USA (California)	A Gaviidae.	
Mergus miscellus	Sp. nov.	Valid	Rafael Alvarez Storrs L. Olson	Late Miocene	Calvert Formation	USA(Virginia and Maryland)	An Anatidae.	
"Milvus" brachypterus	Sp. nov.	Valid	Dénes Jánossy	Early Pleistocene	MQ 1b	Hungary	An Apodidae Incertae Sedis.	
Morus magnus	Sp. nov.	Valid	Hildegarde Howard	Late Miocene	Monterey Formation	USA (California)	A Sulidae.	
Phalacrocorax anatolicus	Sp. nov.	Valid	Cécile Mourer-Chauviré	Middle Miocene	Helvetian	Turkey	A Phalacrocoracidae, transferred to the genus Nectornis Cheneval, 1984 by Mlíkovský, 1998.	
Pterodroma kurodai	Sp. nov.	Valid	Colin J. O. Harrison Cyril A. Walker	Pleistocene	Aldabra Atoll	Seychelles	A Procellariidae.	
Puffinus barnesi	Sp. nov.	Valid	Hildegarde Howard	Late Miocene	Monterey Formation	USA (California)	A Procellariidae.	
Recurvirostra sanctaneboulae	Sp. nov.	Valid	Cécile Mourer-Chauviré	Late Eocene	MP 18	France	A Recurvirostridae, most unlikely it is a Recurvirostra or even a Recurvirostridae.	
Surnia robusta	Sp. nov.	Valid	Dénes Jánossy	Late Pliocene; Early Pleistocene	MN 16, MN 18; MQ 1b	Hungary	A Strigidae.	

== Pterosaurs ==
Name	Status	Authors	Location	Notes
Geosternbergia	Valid	Miller	USA (South Dakota)	Geosternbergia
Peteinosaurus	Valid	Wild	Italy	
Campylognathoides Indicus	Nomen Dubium		India	

== Popular culture ==
- Dinosaur Planet by Anne McAffrey was published. This novel was about a planet called Ireta that was populated by dinosaurs transplanted there by aliens attempting to preserve Earth's Mesozoic biosphere. Paleontologist William A. S. Sarjeant has praised the intelligent pterosaurs descended from Quetzalcoatlus in the novel as plausible.
