= Nodosculda =

Nodosculda Temporal range: Early Cretaceous (late Albian), 105–100 Ma

Scientific classification
- Domain: Eukaryota
- Kingdom: Animalia
- Phylum: Arthropoda
- Class: Malacostraca
- Order: Stomatopoda
- Family: †Sculdidae
- Genus: †Nodosculda; Franţescu, 2012
- Species: †N. fisherorum

Binomial name
- †Nodosculda fisherorum Franţescu, 2012

Extinct genus of mantis shrimp

Nodosculda is an extinct genus of mantis shrimp that lived in North America during the late Albian stage of the Early Cretaceous period, between 105 and 100 million years ago. The only species is Nodosculda fisherorum, known from several specimens uncovered in the Paw Paw Formation of Texas.

== Discovery and naming ==
During the late 20th century, several fossil specimens of mantis shrimp were excavated from outcrops of the Paw Paw Formation in the area around Fort Worth, Texas by amateur paleontologists. These fossils were then collected by paleontologist Robert Reid and housed in the National Museum of Natural History in Washington, D.C.. Over 20 years after their initial discovery, the fossils were studied by paleontologist Ovidiu D. Franţescu, who recognized that they represent a new genus and species which he named Nodosculda fisherorum in 2012. The generic name combines the Latin word "nodus" (meaning knob or swelling) with Sculda (another fossil mantis shrimp), referencing the many knobs and bumps on the animal's carapace and its similarity to Sculda. The specific name honors the Fisher family of Sherman, New York for their support. The specimen USNM 545561 was chosen as the holotype of the species, while several other specimens were designated as paratypes.

== Description ==
With a flattened body, Nodosculda is largely similar in appearance to Sculda, which it is named after. The carapace of Nodosculda is trapezoidal in shape, wider at the back than at the front, and has many knobs and bumps across its surface, giving it an uneven texture. The side margins of the carapace are gently curved and each has a keel running alongside it, while the back margin is concave. A pair of lateral keels run down the length of the carapace, while a pair of transverse keels are present on the front corners of the carapace. At the back of the carapace, there is a short, wide arrow-shaped ridge pointing forwards, with a large knob directly behind its middle.

Like all mantis shrimp, Nodosculda has raptorial appendages attached to its thorax. The propodus (penultimate segment) is ovate in shape and very broad, measuring three times as long as the dactylus (final segment). There is also a groove running down the propodus. The dactylus is short and thin, with no grooves or ornamentation. This is unlike the raptorial appendages of any living mantis shrimp, but does resemble those of Sculda. Similarly, the pleopods (appendages of the abdomen used for swimming) have an ovate shape, wider at the base than at the end. The pleopods are biramous (branched into two lobes), the exopods (outer lobe) of which are composed of six articulated segments, the lower half of which are lined with spines on the margins (15 long spines and at least six much shorter spines). The endopods (inner lobe) are around the size of the exopods and partly exposed, made up of a single segment lined with setae (bristles).

The first four segments of the thorax are covered by the carapace. The fifth thoracic segment (the first to be exposed) is short and only weakly ornamented, unlike the sixth to eighth segments. The sixth thoracic segment has over 10 smooth ridges running down its length, the seventh has over 17 spines arranged in two rows, and the eighth has a distinct row of at least 32 ridges which terminate as spines. Each of the six segments of the abdomen has two rows of small spines, with the number of spines on each segment decreasing along the animal's length (the first abdominal segment has 24 spines while the sixth has only 12). Lateral and marginal keels on each abdominal segment form continuous ridges running down the length of the abdomen. Two sharp, backward-pointed spines are located at each side margin of each abdominal sclerite (hardened part).

Part of the telson is preserved, showing spines of various sizes pointing backwards and arranged in rows, as well as distinct keels running down its length. The uropods are biramous, with the endopod having a thin keel on the outer margin and a coarse dentition-like inner margin, while the exopod has a groove along its outer margin.

== Classification ==
Due to its flattened shape giving it an overall similarity to Sculda, Nodosculda was placed in the family Sculdidae by Franţescu (2012), making it the third known genus in the family (after Sculda and Spinosculda). This family was established by Dames (1886) and belongs to the suborder Unipeltata, which includes all living species of mantis shrimp and extinct forms that lived during the Mesozoic and Cenozoic eras.

The monophyly of Sculdidae was questioned by Smith et al. (2023), who conducted a phylogenetic analysis to determine the relations between fossil mantis shrimp. Their analysis recovered Nodosculda to be a closer relative of the extant Squilla mantis than of Sculda, at a sister taxon position with the modern species. However, the authors note that the incomplete knowledge of Nodosculda, Ursquilla and Lysiosquilla nkporoensis may be responsible for such a result, and that more material is needed to resolve their relationships. The results of their analysis are displayed in the cladogram below:

- Stomatopoda
  - †Archaeocaris
    - Archaeocaris vermiformis
    - Archaeocaris graffhami
  - - - †Bairdops elegans
      - †Perimecturus
        - Perimecturus parki
        - Perimecturus rapax
    - †Bairdops beargulchensis
    - - †Daidal pattoni
      - - - - †Daidal schoellmanni
            - †Daidal acanthocercus
          - †Gorgonophontes
            - Gorgonophontes fraiponti
            - Gorgonophontes peleron
        - - †Chabardella spinosa
        - - †Tyrannophontes theridion
          - - †Tyrannophontes gigantion
            - Unipeltata
              - †Triassosculda ahyongi
              - - †Tyrannosculda laurae
                - - †Pseudosculda laevis
                  - - †Archaeosculda phoenicia
                    - - - †Sculda pennata
                        - †Sculda syriaca
                      - - †Ursquilla yehoachi
                        - - †Lysiosquilla nkporoensis
                          - - †Nodosculda fisherorum
                            - Squilla mantis
