= Cheirodopsis =

Cheirodopsis Temporal range: Viséan

Scientific classification
- Kingdom: Animalia
- Phylum: Chordata
- Class: Actinopterygii
- Order: †Eurynotiformes
- Family: †Amphicentridae
- Genus: †Cheirodopsis; Traquair, 1881
- Species: †C. geikiei

Binomial name
- †Cheirodopsis geikiei Traquair, 1881

Extinct genus of ray-finned fishes

Cheirodopsis is an extinct genus of marine ray-finned fish that lived during the Viséan stage of the Mississippian epoch. It contains a single species, C. geikiei from what is now Glencartholm, Scotland.
