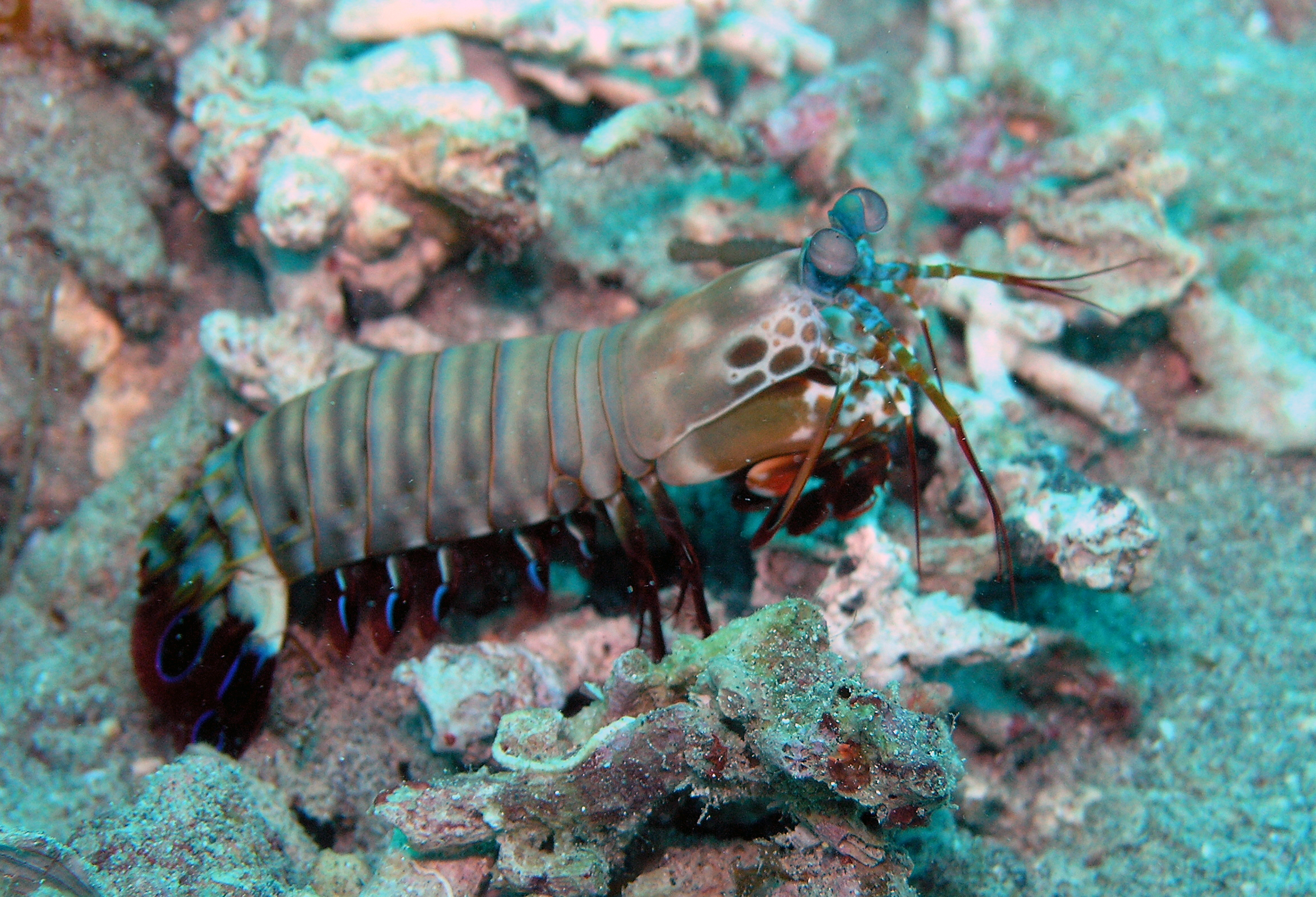
- Odontodactylus scyllarus (Stomatopoda: Odontodactylidae)
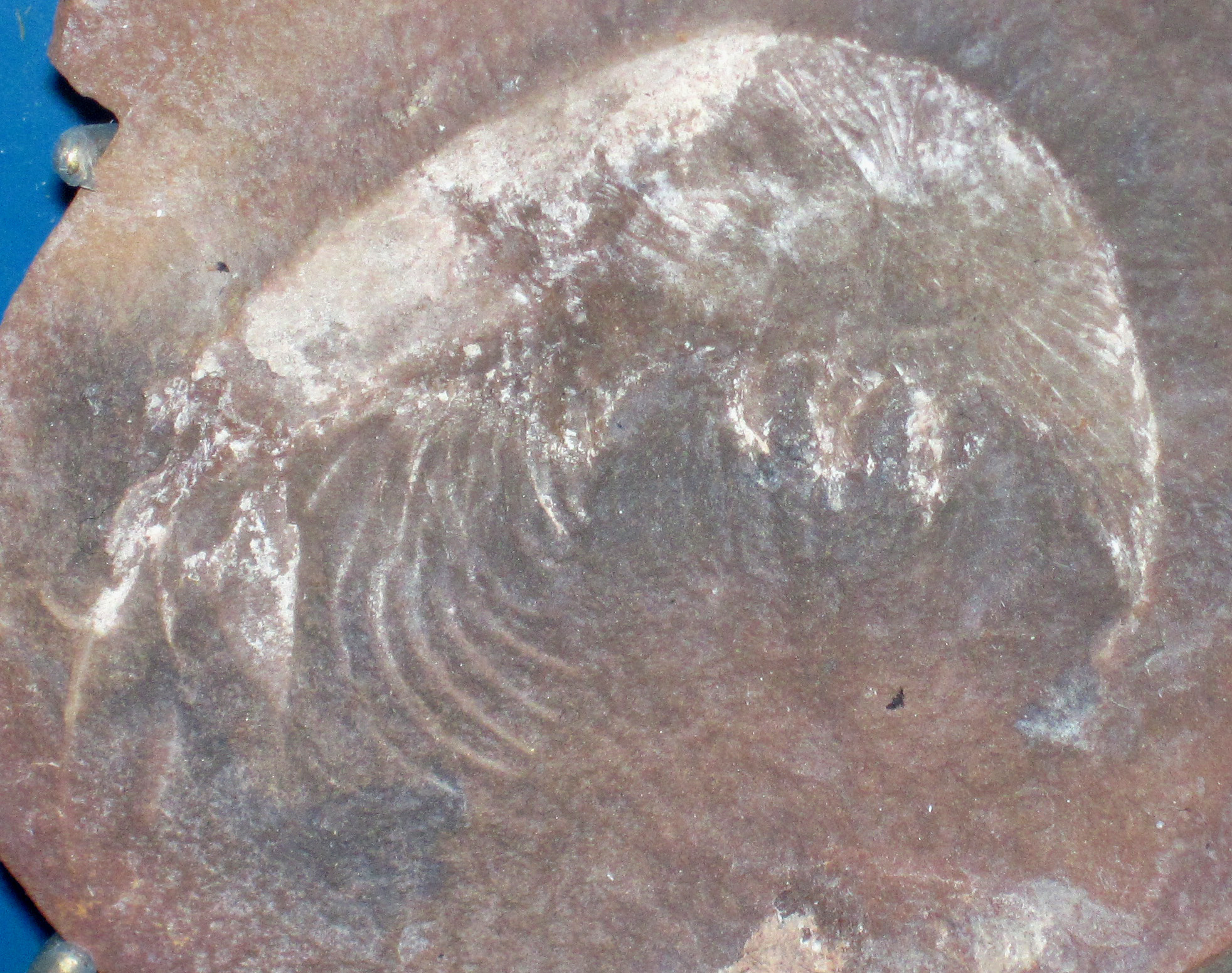
- Fossil of Kallidecthes richardsoni (Aeschronectida: Kallidecthidae)

Scientific classification
- Kingdom: Animalia
- Phylum: Arthropoda
- Clade: Pancrustacea
- Class: Malacostraca
- Subclass: Hoplocarida; Calman, 1904

Orders
- Stomatopoda; Aeschronectida †; Palaeostomatopoda †

= Hoplocarida =

Hoplocarida Temporal range: Upper Devonian–Recent

Subclass of crustaceans

Hoplocarida is a subclass of crustaceans. The only extant members are the mantis shrimp (Stomatopoda), but two other orders existed in the Palaeozoic: Aeschronectida and Palaeostomatopoda.
