= William Thomas Calman =

Scottish zoologist

William Thomas Calman CB FRSE FRS FLS (29 December 1871 – 29 September 1952) was a Scottish zoologist, specialising in the Crustacea. From 1927 to 1936 he was Keeper of Zoology at the British Museum (Natural History) (now the Natural History Museum).

== Life ==
He was born in Dundee, the son of Thomas Calman, a music teacher, and Agnes Beatts Maclean.

He studied at the High School of Dundee.

In the scientific societies in Dundee, he met D'Arcy Thompson. He later became Thompson's lab boy, which allowed him to attend lectures at University College, Dundee for free. A. D. Peacock, one of Thompson's successors to the chair of Natural history at Dundee, believed this appointment came about following a letter sent by Calman in 1891 asking Thompson's advice as to applying for a post in Edinburgh. After his graduation with distinction in 1895, he took on a lecturership at the university, where he remained for eight years. When Thompson died, Calman, along with Douglas Young, wrote his obituary notice in the Royal Society of Edinburgh Yearbook.

He later worked at the Natural History Museum, where he was appointed assistant curator of Arachnida in 1904 (replacing Pocock), became assistant curator of Crustacea and Pycnogonida and Keeper of Zoology. In 1909, he wrote the Crustacea section in Lankester's Treatise on Zoology, where he introduced the superorders Eucarida, Peracarida and Hoplocarida as well as the concept of the caridoid facies, a hypothetical ancestral malacostracan. He wrote several of the entries about crustacea for the Encyclopædia Britannica Eleventh Edition. He also established the current division of the Branchiopoda into the four orders Anostraca, Notostraca, Conchostraca and Cladocera. He was elected a Fellow of the Royal Society in 1921, being the first graduate of the University of Dundee to be so. Calman retired to Tayport in 1936, but returned to teaching during the Second World War at Queen's College, Dundee and St Andrews. He was president of the Quekett Microscopical Club from 1926 to 1928, president of the Linnean Society from 1934 to 1937, and was awarded the Linnean Medal in 1946.

He was awarded CB in 1935. St Andrews University awarded him an honorary doctorate (LLD) in 1937.

He died in Coulsdon in Surrey on 29 September 1952.

== Publications ==
- The Life of Crustacae (1911)
- The Classification of Animals (1949)

== Taxa named by Calman ==
Taxa named by W. T. Calman include:

- Acanthephyra faxoni Calman, 1939
- Anaspidacea Calman, 1904
- Anchicolurus occidentalis (Calman, 1912)
- Anoplodactylus cribellatus Calman, 1923
- Anthracocaris Calman, 1933
- Aristaeomorpha woodmasoni Calman, 1925
- Ascorhynchus extenuata (Calman, 1938)
- Atyella brevirostris Calman, 1906a
- Atyella longirostris Calman, 1906a
- Atyella Calman, 1906a
- Austropallene tibicina Calman, 1915
- Austroraptus juvenilis Calman, 1915
- Austroraptus praecox Calman, 1915
- Bankia australis (Calman, 1920)
- Bathycuma longicaudatum Calman, 1912
- Bathycuma longirostre Calman, 1905
- Bathypallenopsis annandalei (Calman, 1923)
- Bathyzetes extenuata (Calman, 1938)
- Bodotria parva Calman, 1907
- Bodotria similis Calman, 1907
- Bodotria sublevis Calman, 1907
- Bresilia atlantica Calman, 1896
- Bresilia Calman, 1896
- Bresiliidae Calman, 1896
- Bresilioidea Calman, 1896
- Brevitalitrus hotulanus (Calman, 1912)
- Callipallene pectinata (Calman, 1923)
- Calocarcinus africanus Calman, 1909
- Calocarcinus Calman, 1909
- Campylaspis antarctica Calman, 1907
- Campylaspis orientalis Calman, 1911
- Campylaspis platyuropus Calman, 1911
- Campylaspis rostrata Calman, 1905
- Campylaspis spinosa Calman, 1906
- Campylaspis vitrea Calman, 1906
- Caridella cunningtoni Calman, 1906a
- Caridella minuta Calman, 1906a
- Caridella paski Calman, 1928
- Caridella Calman, 1906a
- Caridina indistincta indistincta Calman, 1926
- Caridinides wilkinsi Calman, 1926
- Caridinides Calman, 1926
- Ceratocuma horridum Calman, 1905
- Ceratocuma Calman, 1905
- Ceratocumatidae Calman, 1905
- Cilunculus sewelli Calman, 1938
- Colossendeis drakei Calman, 1915
- Colossendeis scotti Calman, 1915
- Colossendeis wilsoni Calman, 1915
- Colurostylis lemurum Calman, 1917
- Colurostylis pseudocuma Calman, 1911
- Colurostylis Calman, 1911
- Cryptocnemus haddoni Calman, 1900
- Cumella australis Calman, 1907
- Cumella clavicauda Calman, 1911
- Cumella forficula Calman, 1911
- Cumella gracilima Calman, 1905
- Cumella hispida Calman, 1911
- Cumella laevis Calman, 1911
- Cumella leptopus Calman, 1911
- Cumella serrata Calman, 1911
- Cumellopsis helgae Calman, 1905
- Cumellopsis puritani Calman, 1906
- Cumellopsis Calman, 1905
- Cyclaspis cingulata Calman, 1907
- Cyclaspis coelebs Calman, 1917
- Cyclaspis costata Calman, 1904
- Cyclaspis elegans Calman, 1907
- Cyclaspis herdmani Calman, 1904
- Cyclaspis hornelli Calman, 1904
- Cyclaspis longipes Calman, 1907
- Cyclaspis persculpta Calman, 1905
- Cyclaspis picta Calman, 1904
- Cyclaspis sibogae Calman, 1905
- Cyclaspis similis Calman, 1907
- Cyclaspis thomsoni Calman, 1907
- Cyclaspis triplicata Calman, 1907
- Cyclaspis unicornis Calman, 1907
- Cyclaspis uniplicata Calman, 1907
- Cyclaspis varians Calman, 1912
- Diastylis alaskensis Calman, 1912
- Diastylis argentata Calman, 1912
- Diastylis aspera Calman, 1912
- Diastylis bidentata Calman, 1912
- Diastylis dalli Calman, 1912
- Diastylis insularum (Calman, 1908)
- Diastylis koreana Calman, 1911
- Diastylis mawsoni Calman, 1918
- Diastylis nucella Calman, 1912
- Diastylis planifrons Calman, 1912
- Diastylis sulcata Calman, 1912
- Diastylopsis crassior Calman, 1911
- Diastylopsis elongata Calman, 1911
- Dipteropeltis hirundo Calman, 1912
- Dodecolopoda mawsoni Calman & Gordon, 1933
- Dodecolopoda Calman & Gordon, 1933
- Ekleptostylis walkeri (Calman, 1907)
- Endeis flaccida Calman, 1923
- Eocuma affine Calman, 1904
- Eocuma dollfusi Calman, 1907
- Eocuma latum Calman, 1907
- Eocuma longicorne Calman, 1907
- Eocuma stelliferum Calman, 1907
- Eocuma taprobanicum Calman, 1904
- Eucarida Calman, 1904
- Eudorella monodon Calman, 1912
- Eudorella similis Calman, 1907
- Eudorellopsis biplicata Calman, 1912
- Eudorellopsis resima Calman, 1907
- Gennadas capensis Calman, 1925
- Gennadas gilchristi Calman, 1925
- Gennadas gilchristi Calman, 1925
- Glyphocrangon mabahissae Calman, 1939
- Glyptelasma hamatum (Calman, 1919)
- Gynodiastylis bicristata Calman, 1911
- Gynodiastylis carinata Calman, 1911
- Gynodiastylis costata Calman, 1911
- Gynodiastylis Calman, 1911
- Hemileucon comes Calman, 1907
- Hemileucon uniplicatus Calman, 1907
- Hemileucon Calman, 1907
- Heteroleucon akaroensis Calman, 1907
- Heteroleucon Calman, 1907
- Heteromysoides cotti (Calman, 1932)
- Holthuisana wollastoni (Calman, 1914)
- Hoplocarida Calman, 1904
- Hyastenus uncifer Calman, 1900
- Lamprops beringi Calman, 1912
- Leucon heterostylis Calman, 1907
- Leucon siphonatus Calman, 1905
- Lioxanthodes alcocki Calman, 1909
- Lioxanthodes Calman, 1909
- Litogynodiastylis laevis (Calman, 1911)
- Litoscalpellum juddi (Calman, 1918)
- Lophopilumnus cristipes (Calman, 1900)
- Makrokylindrus cingulatus (Calman, 1905)
- Makrokylindrus fistularis (Calman), 1911
- Makrokylindrus tubulicauda (Calman, 1905)
- Namlacium crepidatum (Calman, 1925)
- Nannastacus agnatus Calman, 1911
- Nannastacus brevicaudatus Calman, 1905
- Nannastacus gibbosus Calman, 1911
- Nannastacus gurneyi Calman, 1927
- Nannastacus minor Calman, 1911
- Nannastacus pardus Calman, 1905
- Nannastacus reptans Calman, 1911
- Nannastacus stebbingi Calman, 1904
- Nannastacus tardus Calman, 1911
- Nannastacus zimmeri Calman, 1911
- Nebaliacea Calman, 1904
- Nematobrachion boopis (Calman, 1905)
- Nematobrachion Calman, 1905
- Nymphon andamanense Calman, 1923
- Nymphon arabicum Calman, 1938
- Nymphon foxi Calman, 1927
- Nymphon proximum Calman, 1915
- Oxyurostylis smithi Calman, 1912
- Oxyurostylis Calman, 1912
- Pallenopsis alcocki Calman, 1923
- Pandalina Calman, 1899
- Paradiastylis brachyura Calman, 1904
- Paradiastylis longipes Calman, 1905
- Paradiastylis Calman, 1904
- Paralamprops orbicularis (Calman, 1905)
- Paraleucon suteri Calman, 1907
- Paraleucon Calman, 1907
- Paralimnoria andrewsi (Calman, 1910)
- Parapallene challengeri Calman, 1937
- Parapallene longipes Calman, 1938
- Parapotamon spinescens (Calman, 1905)
- Peracarida Calman, 1904
- Periclimenaeus arabicus (Calman, 1939)
- Periclimenaeus crassipes (Calman, 1939)
- Pigrogromitus timsanus Calman, 1927
- Pigrogromitus Calman, 1927
- Platycuma holti Calman, 1905
- Platycuma Calman, 1905
- Plesionika minor Calman, 1939
- Polycheria osborni Calman, 1898
- Pontonides unciger Calman, 1939
- Potamonautes warreni (Calman, 1918)
- Procampylaspis bonnieri Calman, 1906
- Propallene kempi (Calman, 1923)
- Pseudione giardi Calman, 1898
- Pseudodiastylis ferox Calman, 1905
- Pseudodiastylis Calman, 1905
- Pseudolambrus confragosus (Calman, 1900)
- Pseudoleptocuma minus (Calman, 1912)
- Pycnogonum africanum Calman, 1938
- Rouxana ingrami (Calman, 1908)
- Rouxana plana (Calman, 1914)
- Scherocumella brachydactyla (Calman, 1905)
- Scherocumella gurneyi (Calman, 1927)
- Scherocumella lepturus Calman, 1911
- Schizotrema bifrons Calman, 1911
- Schizotrema depressum Calman, 1911
- Schizotrema sordidum Calman, 1911
- Schizotrema Calman, 1911
- Seguapallene echinata (Calman, 1938)
- Sesarma boulengeri Calman, 1920
- Spinoserolis beddardi (Calman, 1920)
- Squilla brasiliensis Calman, 1917
- Styloptocuma gracillimum (Calman, 1905)
- Sympodomma diomedeae (Calman), 1912
- Sympodomma weberi (Calman, 1905)
- Teloscalpellum ecaudatum (Calman, 1918)
- Thaumastocheles japonicus Calman, 1913
- Trachycaris Calman, 1906b
- Trianguloscalpellum annandalei (Calman, 1918)
- Tropichelura insulae (Calman, 1910)
- Typhlocaris Calman, 1909
- Typhlocaris galilea Calman, 1909
- Vaunthompsonia arabica Calman, 1907
- Zanclopus cephalodisci Calman, 1908
- Zanclopus Calman, 1908
- Zygosiphon mortenseni Calman, 1907
- Zygosiphon Calman, 1907
