= Pseudocheles =

Scientific classification
- Domain: Eukaryota
- Kingdom: Animalia
- Phylum: Arthropoda
- Class: Malacostraca
- Order: Decapoda
- Suborder: Pleocyemata
- Infraorder: Caridea
- Superfamily: Bresilioidea
- Family: Pseudochelidae
- Genus: Pseudocheles; Chace & Brown, 1978

Genus of crustaceans

Pseudocheles is a genus of crustaceans belonging to the monotypic family Pseudochelidae.

The species of this genus are found in Central and Southern America.

Species:

- Pseudocheles chacei Kensley, 1983
- Pseudocheles enigma Chace & Brown, 1978
- Pseudocheles falsapinca Anker, 2012
- Pseudocheles neutra De Grave & Moosa, 2004
