= Disciadidae =

Scientific classification
- Domain: Eukaryota
- Kingdom: Animalia
- Phylum: Arthropoda
- Class: Malacostraca
- Order: Decapoda
- Suborder: Pleocyemata
- Infraorder: Caridea
- Superfamily: Bresilioidea
- Family: Disciadidae

Family of crustaceans

Disciadidae is a family of crustaceans belonging to the order Decapoda.

Genera:

- Discias Rathbun, 1902
- Kirnasia Burukovsky, 1988
- Lucaya Chace, 1939
- Tridiscias Kensley, 1983
