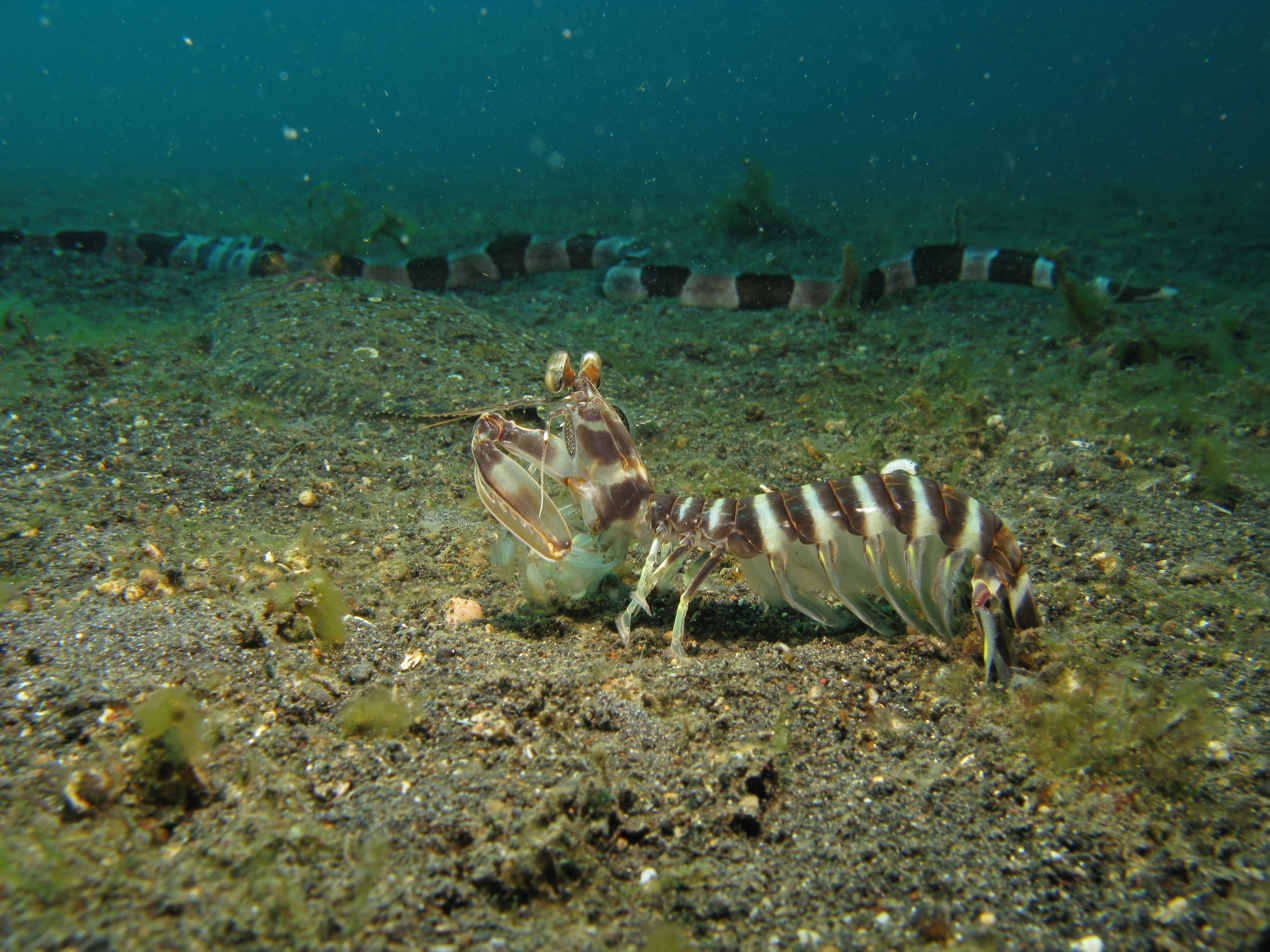
- Lysiosquillina maculata, with an eel in the background.

Scientific classification
- Kingdom: Animalia
- Phylum: Arthropoda
- Clade: Pancrustacea
- Class: Malacostraca
- Order: Stomatopoda
- Superfamily: Lysiosquilloidea
- Family: Lysiosquillidae; Giesbrecht, 1910

Genera
- See text

= Lysiosquillidae =

Family of crustaceans

The Lysiosquillidae or banded mantis shrimps are a family of mantis shrimp, comprising some of the largest known mantis shrimp species. The most common and best known species is Lysiosquillina maculata, the zebra mantis shrimp.

== Natural history ==
Like all mantis shrimps, banded mantis shrimps dig burrows in the sea floor. Their burrows are relatively deep, descending vertically into soft substrate. Unlike other clades, however, they rarely leave their burrows, preferring to ambush their prey from the safety of their homes.

== Genera ==
These are genera in Lysiosquillidae family:

- Lysiosquilla Dana, 1852
- Lysiosquilloides Manning, 1977

== Interactions with humans ==
If banded mantis shrimp leave their burrows, they may be at risk to be caught by artisnal fishers, trawls, or night lights.
