= Agostocaris =

Scientific classification
- Domain: Eukaryota
- Kingdom: Animalia
- Phylum: Arthropoda
- Class: Malacostraca
- Order: Decapoda
- Suborder: Pleocyemata
- Infraorder: Caridea
- Superfamily: Bresilioidea
- Family: Agostocarididae
- Genus: Agostocaris; Hart & Manning, 1986

Genus of crustaceans

Agostocaris is a genus of crustaceans belonging to the monotypic family Agostocarididae.

The species of this genus are found in the Caribbean.

Species:

- Agostocaris acklinsensis Alvarez, Villalobos & Iliffe, 2004
- Agostocaris bozanici Kensley, 1988
- Agostocaris williamsi Hart & Manning, 1986
- Agostocaris zabaletai Mejía-Ortíz, Yañez & López-Mejía, 2017
