= Lioxanthodes =

Scientific classification
- Domain: Eukaryota
- Kingdom: Animalia
- Phylum: Arthropoda
- Class: Malacostraca
- Order: Decapoda
- Suborder: Pleocyemata
- Infraorder: Brachyura
- Family: Xanthidae
- Genus: Lioxanthodes; Calman, 1909

Genus of crabs

Lioxanthodes is a genus of crabs in the family Xanthidae, containing the following species:

- Lioxanthodes alcocki Calman, 1909
- Lioxanthodes madagascariensis Serene, 1984
- Lioxanthodes pacificus Edmondson, 1935
