= Joanellia =

Joanellia Temporal range: Visean–Upper Mississippian

Scientific classification
- Kingdom: Animalia
- Phylum: Arthropoda
- Class: Malacostraca
- Order: †Aeschronectida
- Family: †Aenigmacarididae
- Genus: †Joanellia; Schram & Schram, 1979

Species
- Joanellia lundi Schram, 1979; Joanellia elegans (Peach, 1883)

Extinct genus of crustaceans

Joanellia is an extinct genus of Carboniferous crustaceans. It contains the species Joanellia lundi from lagoons in what is now Montana, and Joanellia elegans from near-shore marine deposits in northern England and southern Scotland.
