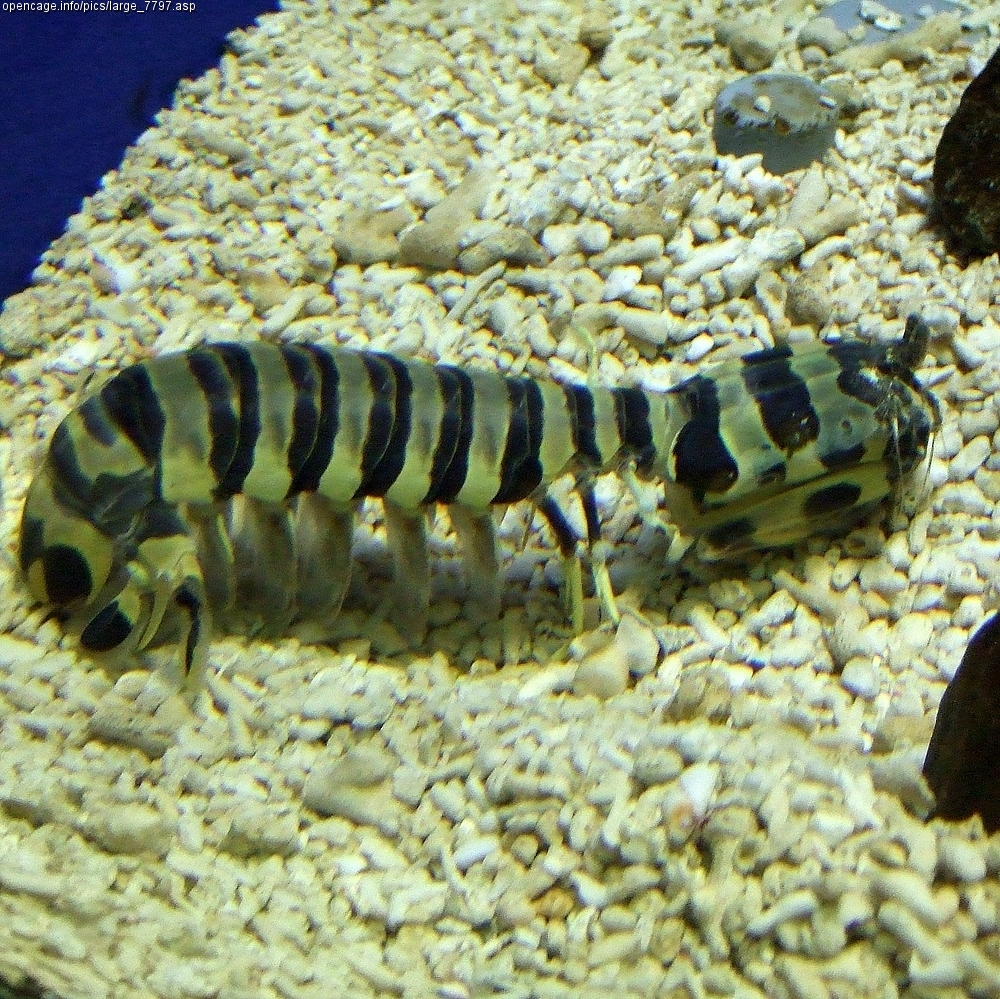

Scientific classification
- Kingdom: Animalia
- Phylum: Arthropoda
- Clade: Pancrustacea
- Class: Malacostraca
- Order: Stomatopoda
- Family: Lysiosquillidae
- Genus: Lysiosquilla
- Species: L. maculata

Binomial name
- Lysiosquilla maculata (Fabricius, 1793)

Synonyms
- Cancer caroli Curtiss, 1938; Lysiosquilla miersi de Vis, 1883; Lysiosquillina maculata (Fabricius, 1793); Squilla maculata Fabricius, 1793

= Lysiosquilla maculata =

Species of mantis shrimp

Lysiosquilla maculata, the zebra mantis shrimp, striped mantis shrimp, or razor mantis, is a species of mantis shrimp found across the Indo-Pacific region from East Africa to the Galápagos and Hawaiian Islands. At a length up to 40 cm, L. maculata is the largest mantis shrimp in the world. L. maculata may be distinguished from its congener L. sulcata by the greater number of teeth on the last segment of its raptorial claw, and by the colouration of the uropodal endopod, the distal half of which is dark in L. maculata but not in L. sulcata. A small artisanal fishery exists for this species.

== Hunting strategies ==
Stomatopods are distinguished by their unique hunting adaptations, the most obvious being their second maxilliped modified into a powerful raptorial claw. Whether a mantis shrimp is classified as a smasher or a spearer is distinguished based on the form of the raptorial claw and the way in which the mantis shrimp uses it. Spearers have unfolded dactyls that are lined with sharp spines and are especially elongated to reach prey. Smashers, though, have folded dactyls that are modified for smashing through their heavily calcified shell. The zebra mantis shrimp is an example of a "spearing" mantis shrimp.

== Predation ==
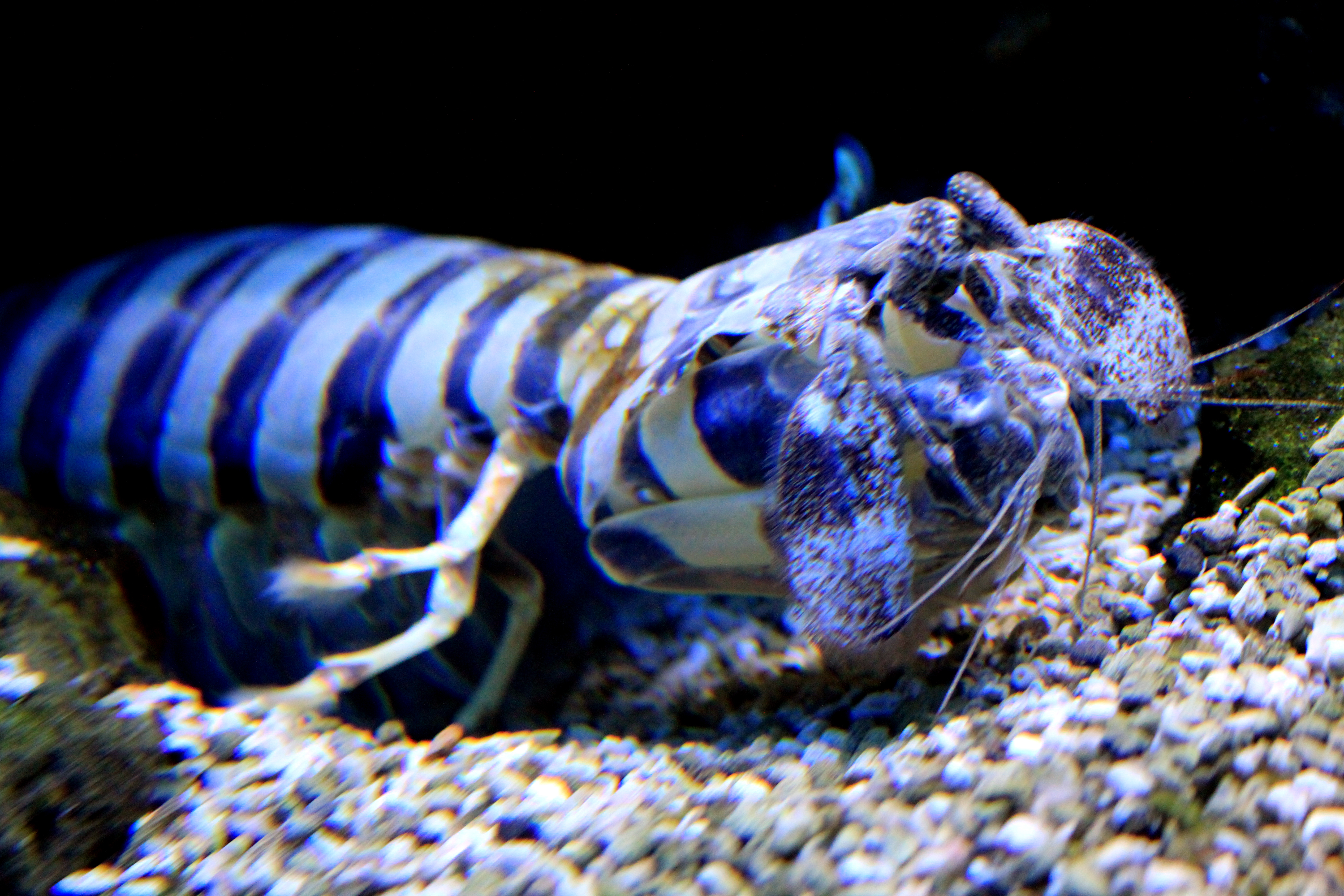
In Prague sea aquarium

By hiding in sandy burrows, L. maculata strikes soft-bodied evasive prey that swim by, such as small fish and malacostracans. To create high attack speeds, it has a spring-and-latch structure at the base of its raptorial appendages that allows it to create a spring-loaded strike. This strike system consists of a four-bar linkage mechanism and a coupled lever. By storing energy in this spring-like system, a faster strike is created than would be possible solely from muscle action.

Prior to attacking prey, L. maculata only peeks its eyes above the entrance to the burrow. As soon as the prey moves within striking distance of the burrow, the mantis shrimp lunges out and snares the prey with both of its raptorial appendages.

Zebra mantis shrimp attack with a mean peak speed of 2.3 m/s and with a mean duration of 24.98 ms. This speed is significantly slower than those generated by the smashing mantis shrimp, whose strikes can reach 14–23 m/s, but it is similar to those of other aquatic predators attacking evasive prey. This discrepancy is because spearing mantis shrimp display displacement amplification, whereas smashing mantis shrimp display force amplification. This makes sense given their hunting strategies. "Smashers" need to apply a large amount of force, but easily get close to their sessile, hard-shelled prey. For "spearers" such as the zebra mantis shrimp, having greater reach when targeting prey with their ambush attack strategy is more advantageous. In addition, larger mantis shrimp species are shown to strike more slowly, resulting in the slower speeds displayed by L. maculata.

== Eyesight ==
The class of crustaceans called stomatopods, which includes L. maculata, has the most complex visual receptors in the animal kingdom. Many species are thought to be able to express up to 16 different visual pigments. In addition, stomatopods have a tripartite cornea, which contains upper and lower halves, separated by a middle band made up of ommatidia. These photoreceptors include specialized receptors that can detect a wide range of visible and ultraviolet light, and are able to detect linearly and circularly polarized light, which is used by many insects for navigation; in other invertebrates such as cephalopods and crustaceans, it is used primarily to increase visual contrast and for visual signaling.

When searching for prey, each eye moves independently from the other, but when prey enters the visual field of one of the eyes, they lock into place focused on the prey.

== Behavior ==
L. maculata displays social monogamy with maternal egg care; the females take care of the eggs. Social monogamy is usually attributed to the large and costly effort to construct burrows of these species, which are used for protection and as a place to hide and wait for prey. In addition, a large risk is associated with finding mates. L. maculata also displays sexual dimorphism, with males having larger raptorial appendages, although males and females have similar overall body sizes.

== Evolution ==
L. maculata belongs to the crustacean order Stomatopoda, made up of three distinct suborders, Palaeostomatopodea, Archaeostomatopodea, and Unipeltata. All living stomatopods belong to the suborder Unipeltata, which contains seven distinct superfamilies of mantis shrimp, made up of almost 500 species. Using molecular clocks, research has shown that around 340 million years ago, stomatopods branched off from their closest crustacean relatives, and the specialized smashing appendage developed around 126 million years ago, after the spearing appendage, which arose around 155 million years ago.
