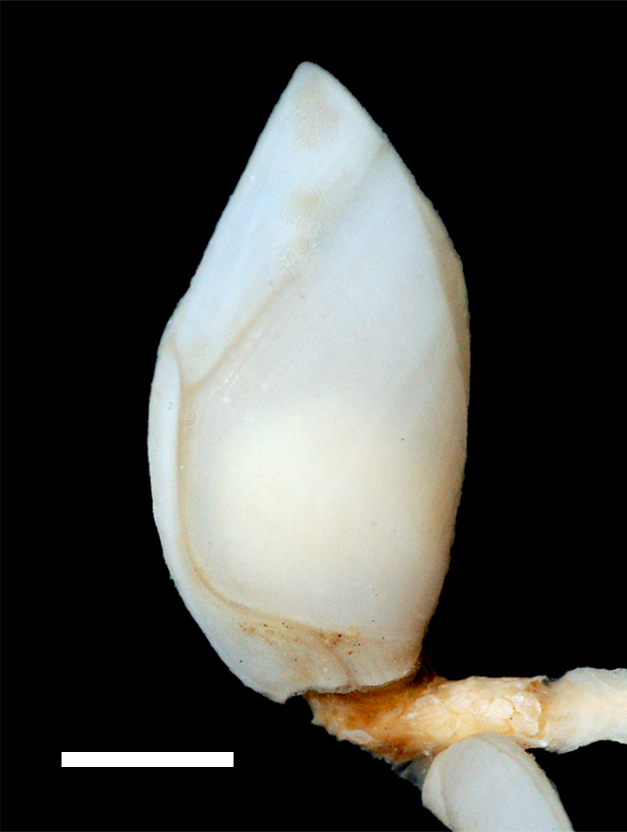

Scientific classification
- Kingdom: Animalia
- Phylum: Arthropoda
- Class: Thecostraca
- Subclass: Cirripedia
- Order: Scalpellomorpha
- Family: Poecilasmatidae
- Genus: Glyptelasma
- Species: G. hamatum

Binomial name
- Glyptelasma hamatum Calman, 1919

= Glyptelasma hamatum =

Species of barnacle

Glyptelasma hamatum is a species of goose barnacle in the family Poecilasmatidae.

== Description ==
G. hamatum is a small stalked barnacle, with a body reaching a length of about 24 mm and a width of about 12.5 mm. The body is covered by 5 smooth white valves which form a keel with a wide base. The stalk (peduncle) that anchors the animal to the substrate is about 5 mm long. In South Africa, it is frequently found attached to the stems of hydrozoans.

== Distribution ==
The species has a cosmopolitan distribution and has been reported worldwide from depths of 366-3,660 m.
