= Aratidecthes =

Scientific classification
- Kingdom: Animalia
- Phylum: Arthropoda
- Class: Malacostraca
- Order: †Aeschronectida
- Family: †Aratidecthidae
- Genus: †Aratidecthes; Schram, 1969

Type species
- Aratidecthes johnsoni Schram 1969

Extinct genus of crustaceans

Aratidecthes is an extinct genus of crustaceans.
