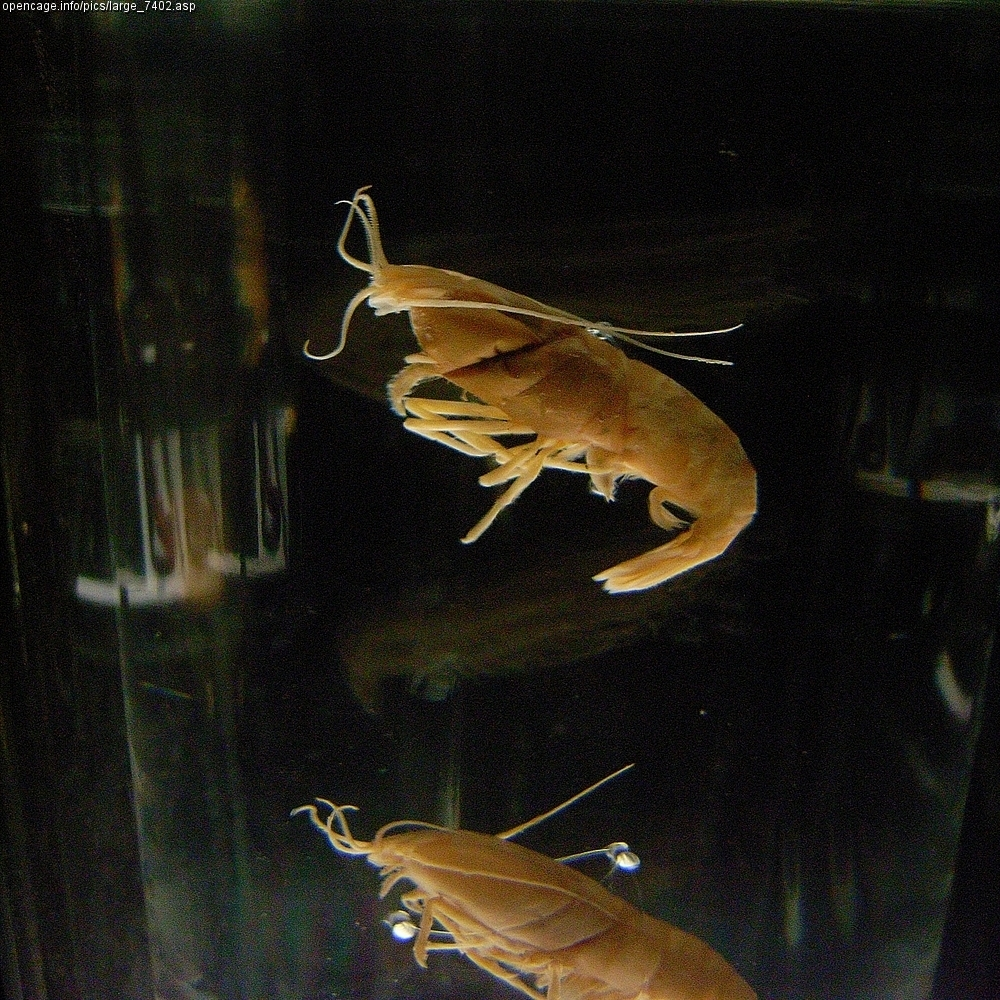
- Rimicaris kairei

Scientific classification
- Kingdom: Animalia
- Phylum: Arthropoda
- Clade: Pancrustacea
- Class: Malacostraca
- Order: Decapoda
- Suborder: Pleocyemata
- Infraorder: Caridea
- Superfamily: Bresilioidea; Calman, 1896

Families
- Agostocarididae Hart & Manning, 1986; Alvinocarididae Christoffersen, 1986; Bresiliidae Calman, 1896; Disciadidae Rathbun, 1902; Pseudochelidae De Grave & Moosa, 2004; Genus Occultocaris

= Bresilioidea =

Superfamily of crustaceans

Bresilioidea is a superfamily of shrimp. It is likely to be an artificial group, containing five families which may or may not be related.
