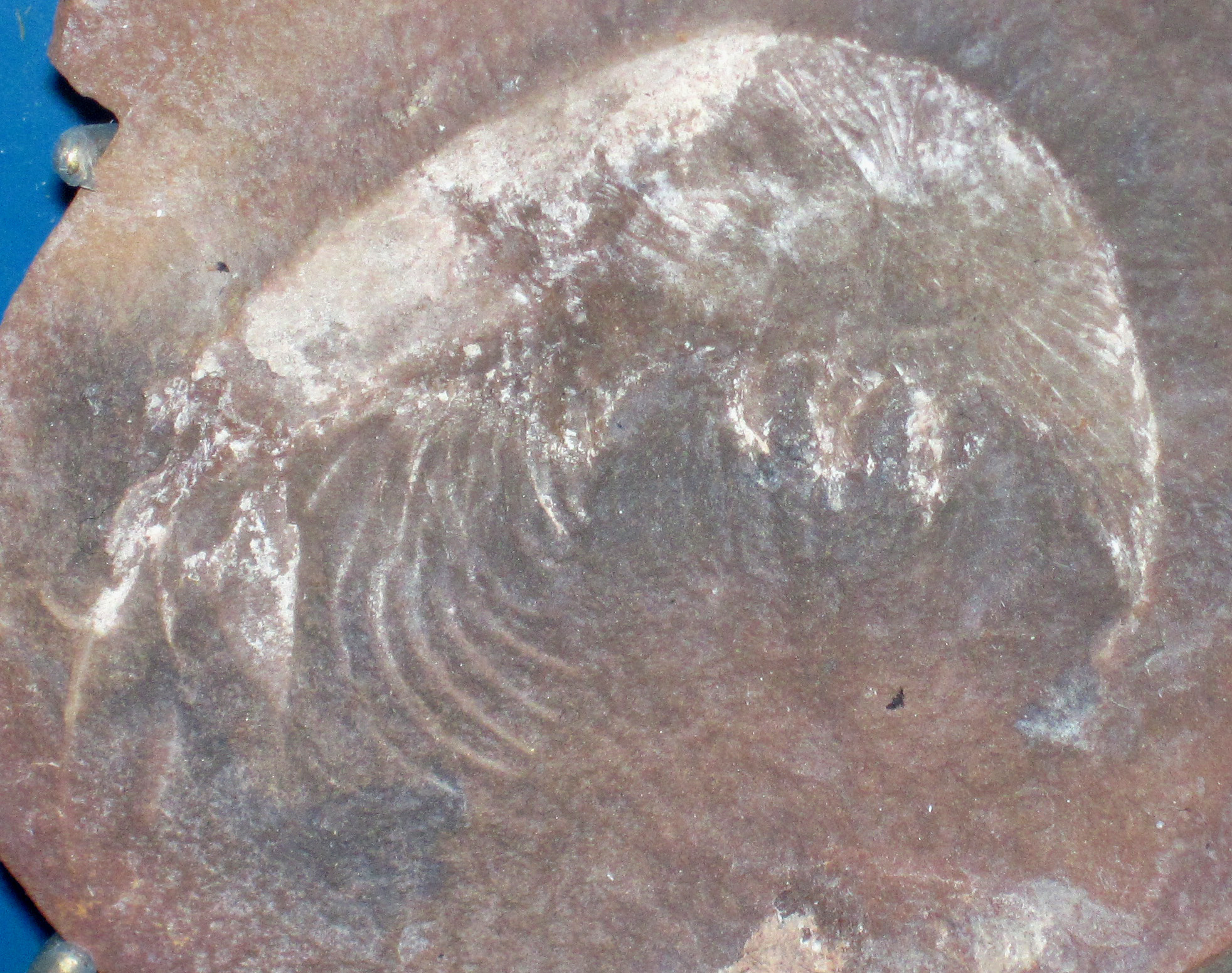
- Fossil Kallidecthes richardsoni, a species of Aeschronectida

Scientific classification
- Kingdom: Animalia
- Phylum: Arthropoda
- Clade: Pancrustacea
- Class: Malacostraca
- Subclass: Hoplocarida
- Order: †Aeschronectida; Schram, 1969

Families and genera
- Aenigmacarididae: Aenigmacaris; Joanellia; Aratidecthidae: Aratidecthes; Crangopsis; Kallidecthidae: Kallidecthes

= Aeschronectida =

Extinct order of crustaceans

Aeschronectida is an extinct order of mantis shrimp-like crustaceans which lived in the Mississippian subperiod in what is now Montana. They exclusively lived in the Carboniferous, or the age of amphibians. They have been found mostly in the U.S. and in the British Isles, in 1979 species were found in the Madera Formation in New Mexico. Aeschronectida was first identified appearing in Continental Europe in around 2014. While sharing similar characteristics to Stomatopoda, they lack certain physical characteristics of that taxon. The first species of Aeschronectida is accredited to Frederick R. Schram. They diverge substantially from typical hoplocaridan morphology by having more unmodified thoracopods. It's theorized that these thoracopods evolved to become more specialized, making them potential ancestors to Stomatopoda.

== Morphology ==
Aeschronectida have typical characteristics of hoplocarids including 3-flagellate first antenna, an enlarged abdomen, a shortened thorax, 3-segmented thoracic protopods, cephalic kinesis, pleopodal epipodite gills, and an articulated rostrum. The bodies of Aeschronectids are divided into four tagmata: the food-processing unit, the pleon plus tailfan, the walking-appendage area, and the sensorial unit. They differ from typical hoplocarids by having their carapace covering the entire thorax and the unspecialized thoracopods acting as natatory appendages Like the mantis shrimp, their eyes are stalked and elevated on the anterior cephalon. Unlike Stomatopods, their functional morphology is poorly understood. This limited understanding of their morphology and the presence of damaged fossils makes them much more difficult to not only identify, but to specify species as well.

== Taxonomy ==
Class: Malacostraca

Subclass: Hoplocarida

Families & genera

- Aenigmacarididae
  - Aenigmacaris
    - Aenigmacaris minima
    - Aenigmacaris cornigerum
  - Joanellia
    - Joanellia lundi
    - Joanellia elegans
- Aratidecthidae
  - Aratidecthes
    - Aratidecthes johnsoni
  - Crangopsis
- Kallidecthidae
  - Kallidecthes
    - Kallidecthes richardsoni

== Identification/studies ==
Aeschronectids are particularly hard to identify due to their fossils being damaged or half-digested. A preserved structure of a tail fan and attached abdomens are generally used to distinguish Aeschronectids from their modern counterparts. Due to the damage many fossils have sustained, many of them are identified as being part of Aeschronectida and not distinguished to a singular species of genus. Many studies involving Aeschronectids generally try and distinguish new families and Genera or try and connect them as potential predecessors to Stomatopoda.
