= Waterstonella =

Waterstonella Temporal range: Lower Carboniferous

Scientific classification
- Kingdom: Animalia
- Phylum: Arthropoda
- Subphylum: Crustacea
- Order: Waterstonellidea Schram, 1981
- Family: Waterstonellidae Schram, 1979
- Genus: Waterstonella Schram, 1979
- Species: W. grantonensis

Binomial name
- Waterstonella grantonensis Schram, 1979

Extinct genus of crustaceans

Waterstonella grantonensis is a species of fossil crustacean so distinct from other crustaceans that it has been placed in its own genus, Waterstonella, family, Waterstonellidae, and order, Waterstonellidea. It is named after Charles Waterstone, keeper of geology at the Royal Scottish Museum, while the specific epithet commemorates the location where the fossil was found, the Granton shrimp beds, near Edinburgh.
