= Granton Shrimp Bed =

Fossil-bearing deposit in Scotland

Coordinates: 55.98056°N 3.26005°W

The Granton Shrimp Bed is a fossil-bearing deposit exposed on the southern shore of the Firth of Forth near Edinburgh, in Scotland. It is classified as a Konservat-Lagerstätten because of the exceptional quality of preservation of the fossils and is dominated by crustaceans; the deposit dates back to the Lower Carboniferous, some 359 to 323 million years ago.

== Location and geological setting ==
The Granton Shrimp Bed is located on the south shore of the Firth of Forth about 3 km (2 mi) from the centre of Edinburgh. It consists of a layer of dolomitic limestone surrounded by Dinantian mud shales which were formed as a result of the deposit of material in either a delta plain setting or in an inter-distributary bay, where sedimentation occurred because of flood-generated incursions.

The shrimp bed resulted from the periodic inundations of marine water into stagnant lagoons, each incursion leaving a lamina of limestone rich in the fossils of soft-bodied marine invertebrates and other animals. These conditions of fluctuating salinity seem to have created a suitable habitat for an assemblage of shrimp-like crustaceans, fish, bellerophonts, conchostracans and ostracods. The sudden changes in salinity caused mass mortalities of this fauna, and also brought marine species such as orthocone cephalopods, polychaete worms and conodonts, which are also found fossilised here.

== Fauna ==
The Granton Shrimp Bed was first brought to the attention of the scientific community by D. Tait in 1923. He stated that a common crustacean fossilised in the bed was Tealliocaris, but that there were other species there new to science. One of these, the commonest shrimp in this community, was subsequently described by F.R. Schram in 1979 as Waterstonella grantonensis, named for Dr. Charles Waterstone, keeper of geology at the Royal Scottish Museum, and the location where it was found. The shrimp bed is also important because it was the first place to provide evidence of the structure of conodonts; this is because these animals were soft-bodied, and only their teeth were suited for preservation under normal conditions. Other unique soft-bodied animals were also found in the bed. The small number of fossils with shells were not decalcified, and the lack of bioturbation suggests that the sediment was largely lacking in oxygen. The exceptional state of preservation suggests that the assemblage of fossils is likely to represent the original community and not just some elements of it.
