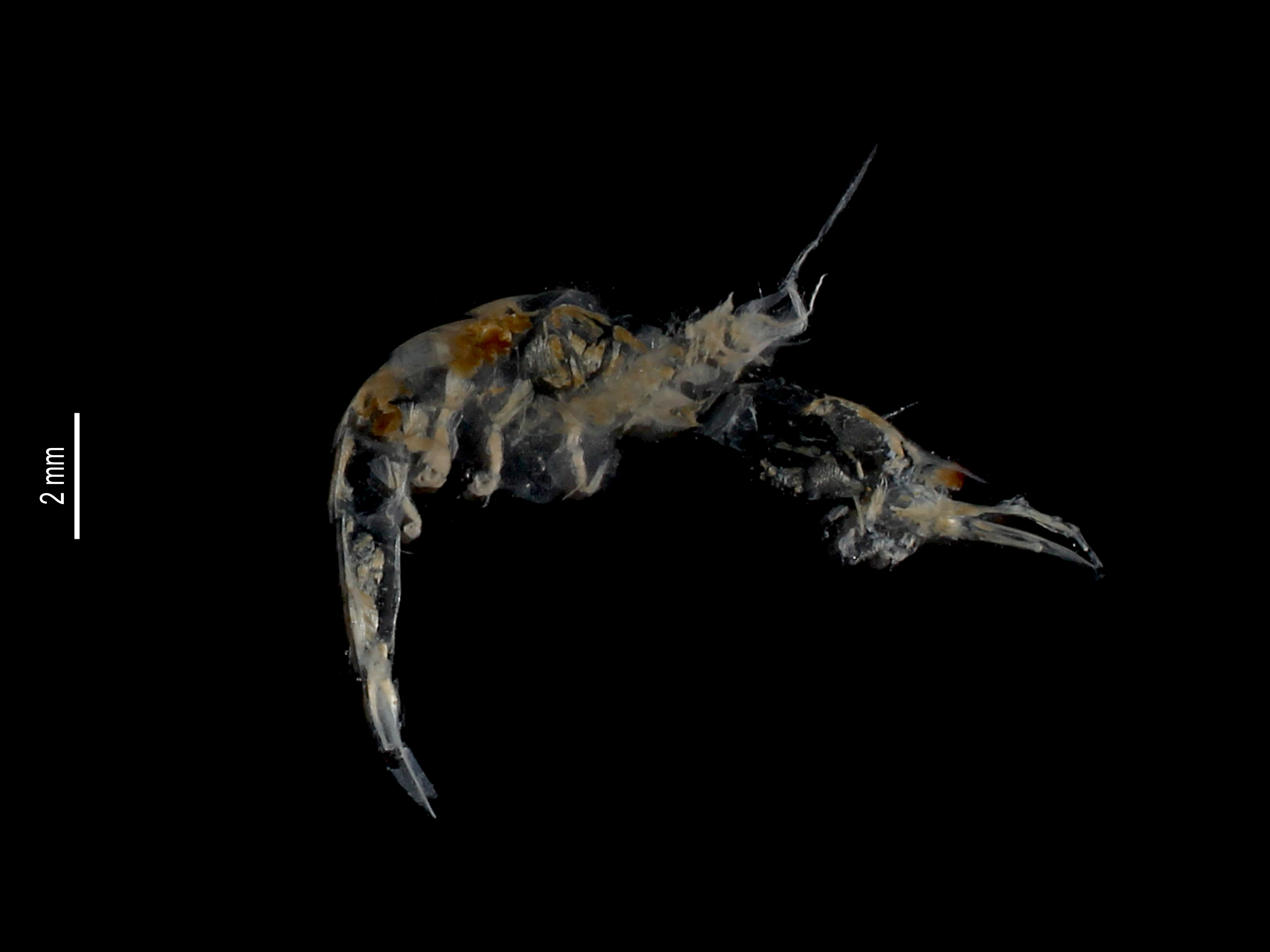

Scientific classification
- Domain: Eukaryota
- Kingdom: Animalia
- Phylum: Arthropoda
- Class: Malacostraca
- Order: Decapoda
- Suborder: Pleocyemata
- Infraorder: Caridea
- Superfamily: Bresilioidea
- Family: Bresiliidae

= Bresiliidae =

Family of crustaceans

Bresiliidae is a family of crustaceans belonging to the order Decapoda.

Genera:

- Bresilia Calman, 1896
- Encantada Wicksten, 1989
