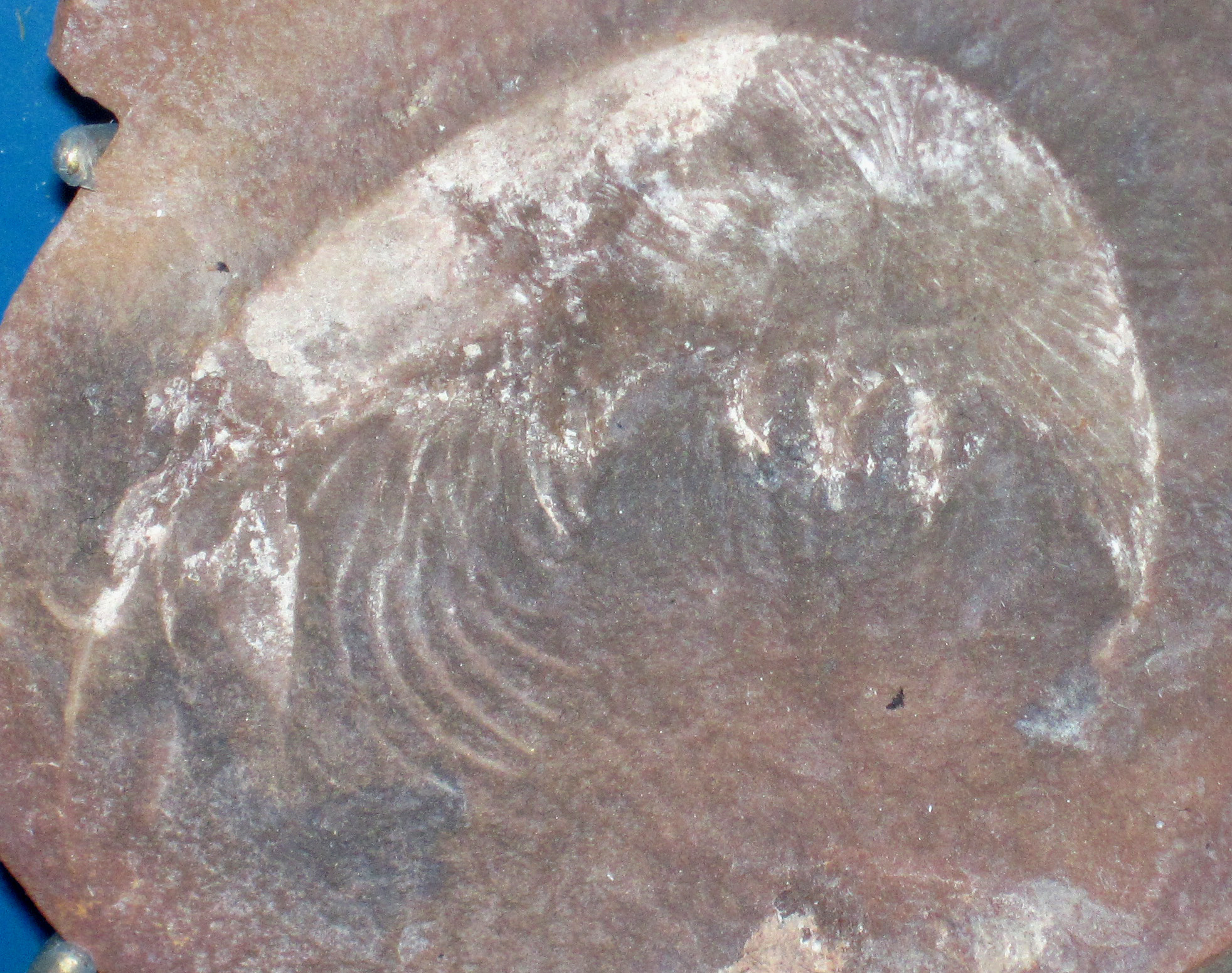

Scientific classification
- Kingdom: Animalia
- Phylum: Arthropoda
- Clade: Pancrustacea
- Class: Malacostraca
- Order: †Aeschronectida
- Family: †Kallidecthidae; Schram, 1969
- Genus: †Kallidecthes; Schram, 1969
- Species: †K. richardsoni

Binomial name
- †Kallidecthes richardsoni Schram, 1969

= Kallidecthes =

Kallidecthes Temporal range: Middle Pennsylvanian

Extinct genus of crustaceans

Kallidecthes is an extinct genus of crustaceans.
