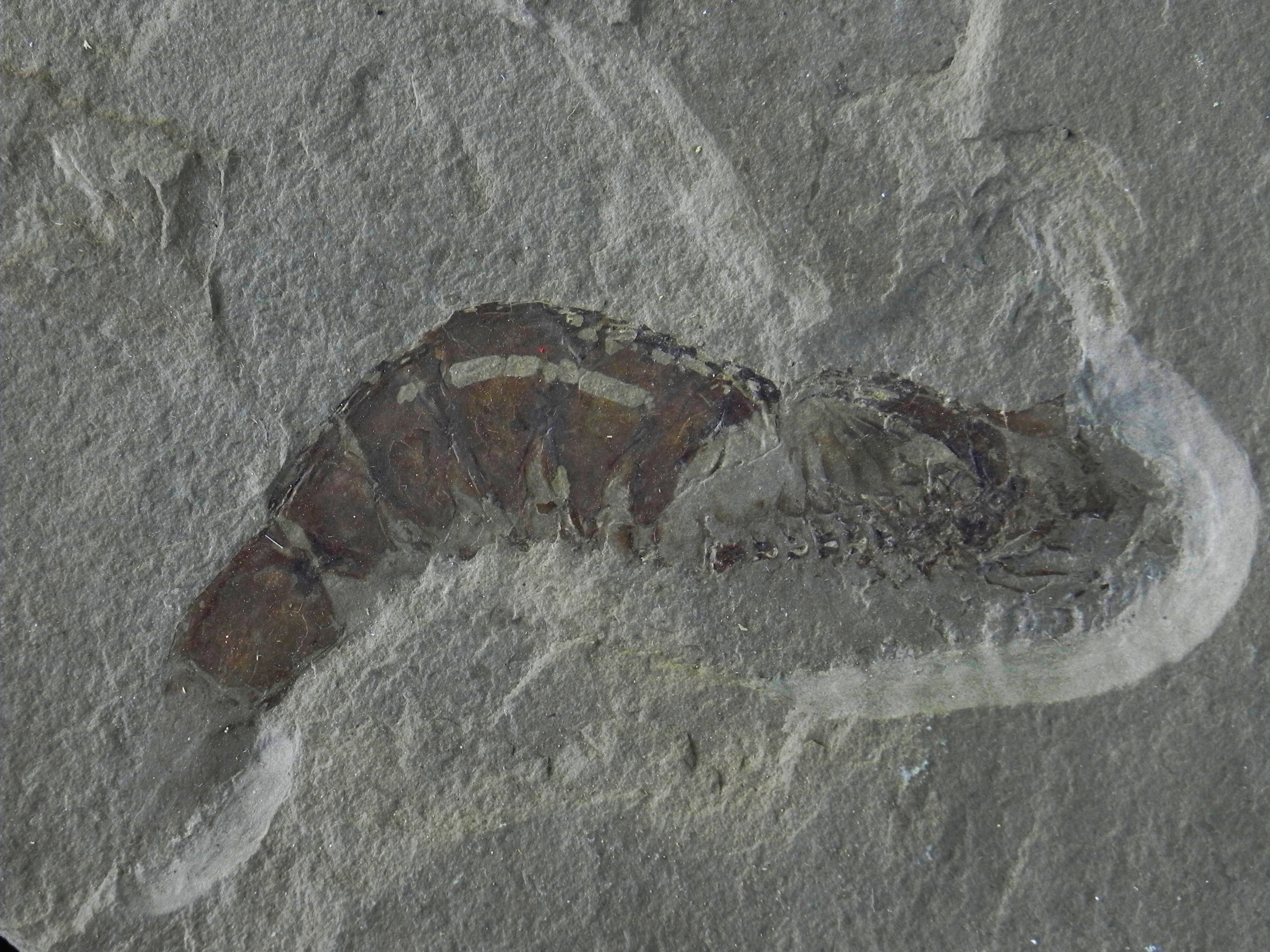
- †Aenigmacaris cornigerum SCHRAM & HORNER 1979 from the Mississippian (Serpukhovian) Heath Formation of Bear Gulch, Montana.

Scientific classification
- Kingdom: Animalia
- Phylum: Arthropoda
- Class: Malacostraca
- Order: †Aeschronectida
- Family: †Aenigmacarididae
- Genus: †Aenigmacaris; Schram and Horner, 1978

= Aenigmacaris =

Extinct genus of crustaceans

Aenigmacaris is an extinct genus of malacostracan crustacean, which includes the species Aenigmacaris cornigerum and Aenigmacaris minima. Their closest extant relatives are the mantis shrimp.
