= Schizopoda =

Class of crustaceans

Schizopoda is a former taxonomical classification of a division of the class Malacostraca. Although it was split in 1883 by Johan Erik Vesti Boas into the two distinct orders Mysidacea and Euphausiacea, the order Schizopoda continued to be in use until the 1930s.
