= Crangopsis =

Scientific classification
- Kingdom: Animalia
- Phylum: Arthropoda
- Class: Malacostraca
- Order: †Aeschronectida
- Family: †Aratidecthidae
- Genus: †Crangopsis; Salter, 1863

Extinct genus of crustaceans

Crangopsis is an extinct genus of crustacean.
