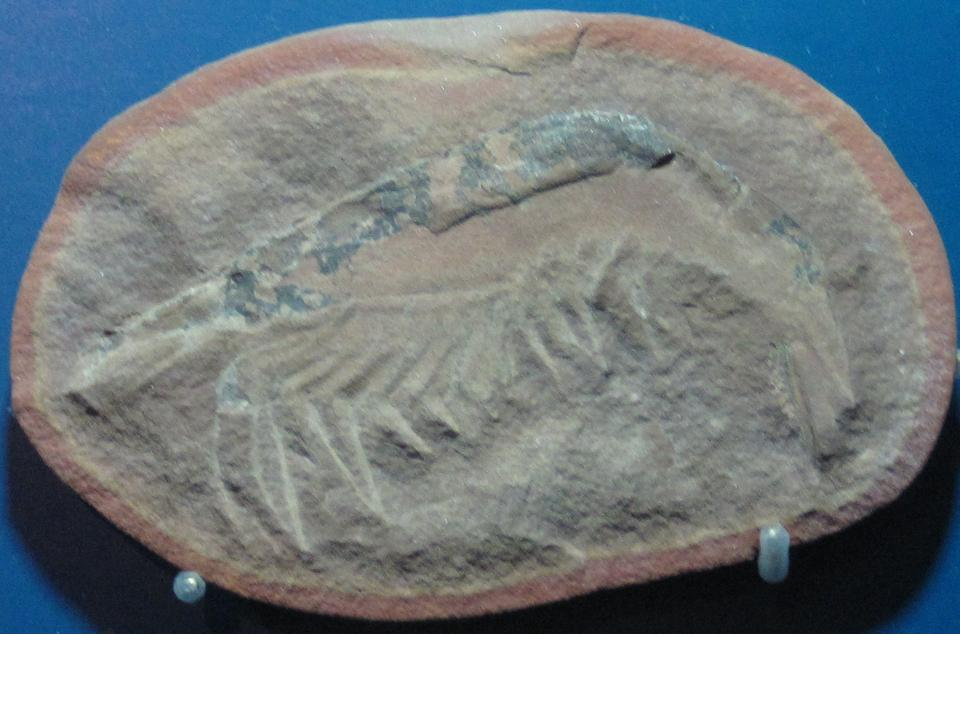

Scientific classification
- Kingdom: Animalia
- Phylum: Arthropoda
- Clade: Pancrustacea
- Class: Malacostraca
- Order: †Belotelsonidea
- Family: †Belotelsonidae
- Genus: †Belotelson; Packard, 1886

Species
- Belotelson magister Packard, 1886; Belotelson traquairi (Peach, 1882)

= Belotelson =

Belotelson Temporal range: Pennsylvanian

Extinct genus of crustaceans

Belotelson is a genus of crustaceans, in the extinct order Belotelsonidea, containing at least two species. It was first named by Packard in 1886 from material found in the Mazon Creek lagerstätte in Illinois. Its fossils have been found in Pennsylvanian age rocks.
