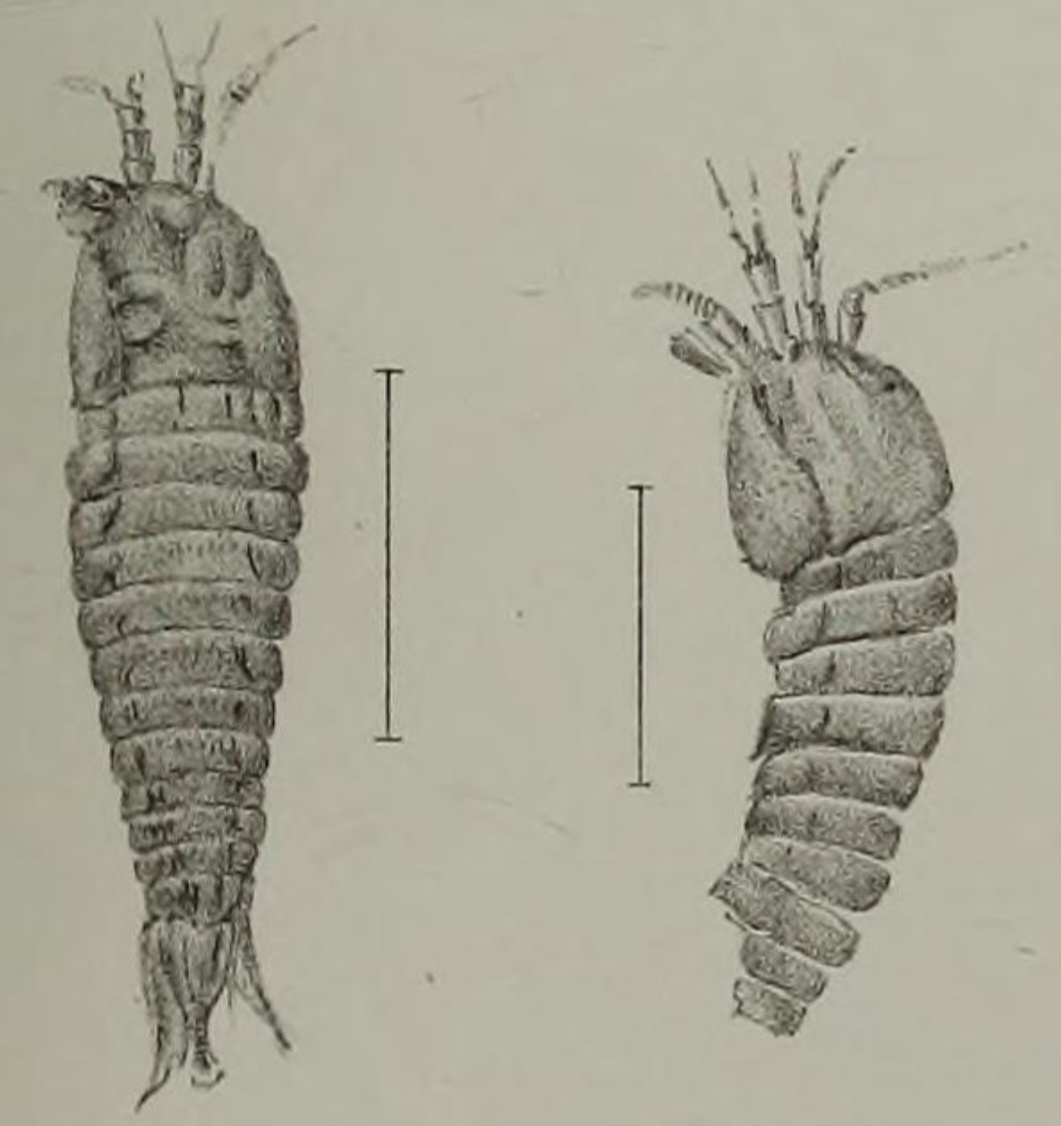
- Illustration of two fossils of A. scotica

Scientific classification
- Kingdom: Animalia
- Phylum: Arthropoda
- Clade: Pancrustacea
- Class: Malacostraca
- Order: Tanaidacea
- Suborder: †Anthracocaridomorpha
- Family: †Anthracocarididae; Brooks, 1962
- Genus: †Anthracocaris; Calman, 1933
- Species: †A. scotica

Binomial name
- †Anthracocaris scotica (Peach, 1882)

Synonyms
- Palaeocaris scoticus Peach, 1882; Palaeocaris scotica Peach, 1908

= Anthracocaris =

Anthracocaris Temporal range: Early Carboniferous

Fossil genus of crustaceans

Anthracocaris, from Ancient Greek ἄνθραξ (ánthrax), meaning "coal", and καρίς (karís), meaning "shrimp", is an extinct genus of crustaceans which lived during the Early Carboniferous period in Scotland. It is the only genus in the family Anthracocarididae. The genus contains a single species, A. scotica, which was first named as a species of Palaeocaris in 1882, but later recognized to belong in a separate genus.

== Discovery and naming ==
Fossil remains of Anthracocaris were first studied by British geologist Ben Peach, who analyzed around 30 specimens of this animal which were collected by A. Macconochie in Eskdale, Scotland. Recognizing that these fossils represent a new species, Peach named this species Palaeocaris scoticus in 1882, believing it was the first species of Palaeocaris to be discovered in Britain. In 1908, Peach published a monograph on the Carboniferous crustaceans of Scotland in which he once again described this species, noting that there exist many additional specimens of it aside from those he studied for its initial publication, and the spelling of its specific name was changed to scotica.

This species was first realized to belong in a separate genus in 1933, when Scottish Zoologist William Thomas Calman reexamined nine fossils of this crustacean (seven of which were figured by Peach in the original description) and found that it did not belong in the same genus or even the same order as the type species of Palaeocaris. He therefore erected the monotypic genus Anthracocaris to contain this species, renamed as A. scotica, which became the type species of this genus.
