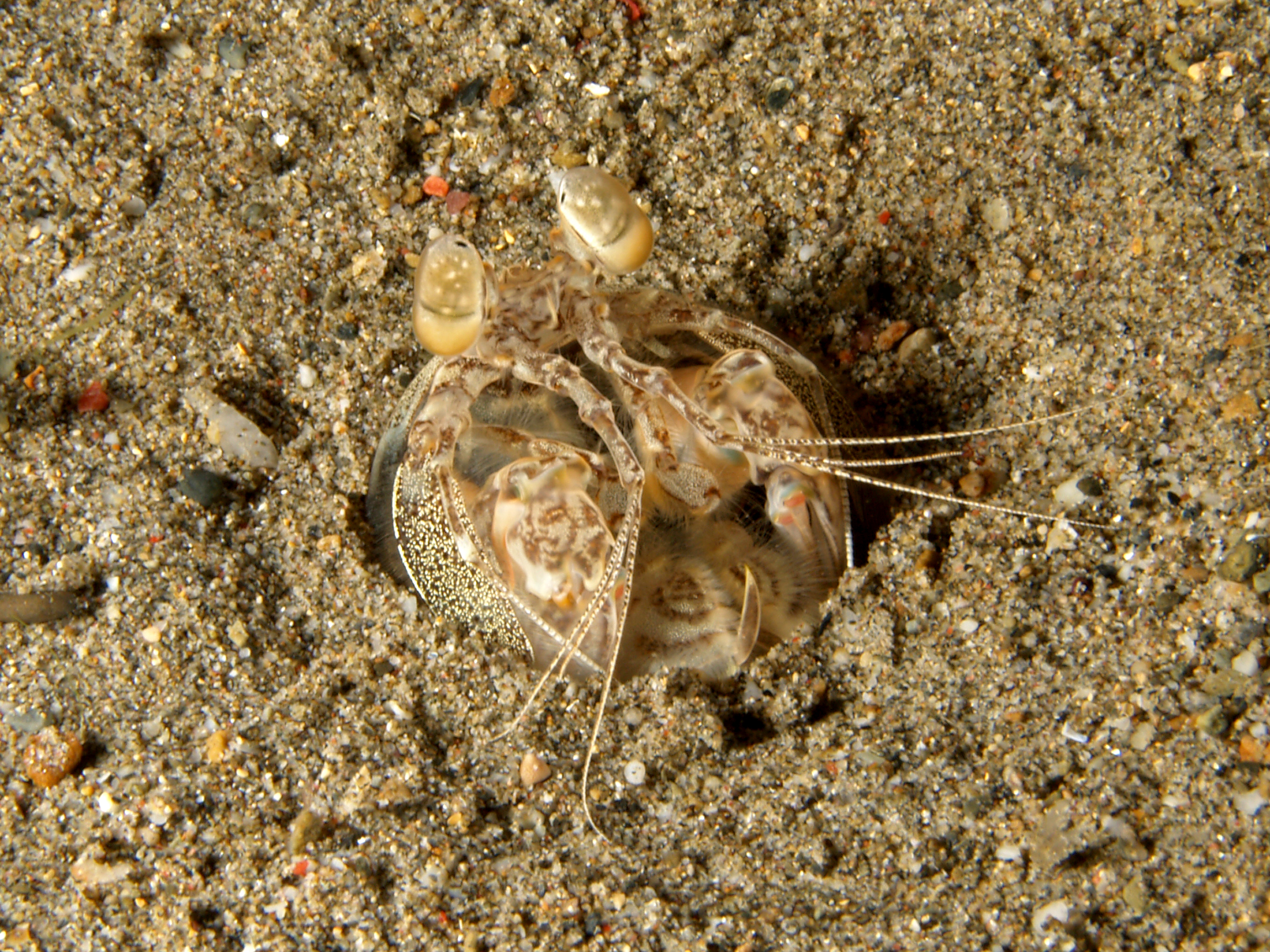
- L. tredecimdentata

Scientific classification
- Kingdom: Animalia
- Phylum: Arthropoda
- Clade: Pancrustacea
- Class: Malacostraca
- Order: Stomatopoda
- Family: Lysiosquillidae
- Genus: Lysiosquilla; Dana, 1852

Species
- See text.

Synonyms
- Lysioerichthus Brooks, 1886; Lysiosquillina Manning, 1995

= Lysiosquilla =

Genus of mantis shrimps

Lysiosquilla is a genus of mantis shrimp of the family Lysiosquillidae, containing these species:

- Lysiosquilla campechiensis Manning, 1962
- Lysiosquilla capensis Hansen, 1895
- Lysiosquilla colemani Ahyong, 2001
- Lysiosquilla glabriuscula (Lamarck, 1818)
- Lysiosquilla hoevenii (Herklots, 1851)
- Lysiosquilla isos Ahyong, 2004
- Lysiosquilla lisa (Ahyong & Randall, 2001)
- Lysiosquilla maculata (Fabricius, 1793)
- Lysiosquilla manningi Boyko, 2000
- Lysiosquilla monodi Manning, 1977
- Lysiosquilla panamica Manning, 1971
- Lysiosquilla scabricauda (Lamarck, 1818)
- Lysiosquilla sulcata Manning, 1978
- Lysiosquilla sulcirostris Kemp, 1913
- Lysiosquilla suthersi Ahyong, 2001
- Lysiosquilla tredecimdentata Holthuis, 1941
