= Sairocaris =

Sairocaris Temporal range: Mississippian

Scientific classification
- Kingdom: Animalia
- Phylum: Arthropoda
- Clade: Pancrustacea
- Class: Malacostraca
- Order: †Hoplostraca
- Family: †Sairocarididae
- Genus: †Sairocaris; Rolfe, 1963

Extinct genus of crustaceans

Sairocaris is an extinct genus of crustaceans, in the order Hoplostraca, that lived in the Mississippian age.
