= Glencartholm =

Place and building in Dumfries and Galloway, Scotland

Coordinates: 55.1036°N 2.9751°W

Glencartholm is a location in Dumfries and Galloway, southern Scotland, along the River Esk.

The Glencartholm Volcanic Beds contain a Palaeozoic (specifically Carboniferous) fossil fish site of international importance. Discovered in 1879, most of the fossils were removed during the 1930s, but in the 1990s a further site 50 m (160 ft) east, named Mumbie, was excavated. This led to the identification of further fish beds, where over 200 specimens of ray-finned fish were collected, including one possible new species

There is also a farmhouse known as Glencartholm, or Glencartholm Farmhouse, which is a listed building in the parish of Canonbie, not far from the border with England, and near Glencartholm Wood. The farm has an inscription celebrating the defeat of Napoleon at the Battle of Waterloo.
