= 2007 in paleontology =

Paleontology or palaeontology is the study of prehistoric life forms on Earth through the examination of plant and animal fossils. This includes the study of body fossils, tracks (ichnites), burrows, cast-off parts, fossilised feces (coprolites), palynomorphs and chemical residues. Because humans have encountered fossils for millennia, paleontology has a long history both before and after becoming formalized as a science. This article records significant discoveries and events related to paleontology that occurred or were published in the year 2007.

== Plants ==
=== Angiosperms ===
Name	Novelty	Status	Authors	Age	Unit	Location	Notes	Images
Orontium mackii	sp nov	Valid	Bogner, Johnson, Kvacek, & Upchurch	Cretaceous; Maastrichtian?	McRae Formation	USA; Texas	An Orontium species	
Orontium wolfei	sp nov	Valid	Bogner, Johnson, Kvacek, & Upchurch	Eocene; Ypresian	Okanagan Highlands; Klondike Mountain Formation	US; Washington	An Orontium species Also reported from the Allenby Formation	Orontium wolfei
Saururus tuckerae	sp nov	Valid	Smith & Stockey	Eocene; Ypresian	Okanagan Highlands; Princeton	Canada; British Columbia	A Saururus species	
Tetracentron hopkinsii	sp nov	Valid	Pigg, Dillhoff, DeVore, & Wehr	Eocene; Ypresian	Okanagan Highlands; Allenby Formation	Canada; British Columbia	A Tetracentron species	Tetracentron hopkinsii
Trochodendron drachukii	sp nov	Valid	Pigg, Dillhoff, DeVore, & Wehr	Eocene; Ypresian	Okanagan Highlands unnamed formation, Kamloops Group	Canada; British Columbia	A Trochodendron species	

=== General paleobotanical research ===
- An approximately 1,000 ha (3.9 mi^{2}) Pennsylvanian (Desmoinesian) age rainforest is reported from the Herrin #6 coal mine in Illinois by DiMichele et al.

== Fungi ==
=== newly named ===
Name	Novelty	Status	Authors	Age	Unit	Location	Notes	Images
Margaretbarromyces	Gen et sp nov	Valid	Mindell, Stockey, Beard & Currah	Eocene	Appian Way Flora	Canada	Extinct ascomycete fungus	
Palaeoagaracites	Gen et sp nov.	Valid	Poinar & Buckley	Late Albian (Cretaceous)	Burmese amber	Myanmar	oldest mushroom genus described from the fossil record.	

== Arthropoda ==
=== Crustaceans ===
==== Research ====
- Schram (2007) publishes a revision of Paleozoic stomatopods, erecting the families Gorgonophontidae and Daidalidae.

==== New taxa ====
Name	Novelty	Status	Authors	Age	Unit	Location	Notes	Images
Daidal	Gen. et. comb. nov./ Gen. et. sp. nov	Valid	Schram	Carboniferous	Bear Gulch Limestone; Lower Limestone Formation	USA; Montana Scotland Germany	A mantis shrimp, type species is D. acanthocercus (originally described in 1998 as Tyrannophontes acanthocercus), genus also includes the species D. pattoni and D. schoellmanni	Daidal acanthocercus
Tyrannophontes gigantion	Sp. nov	Valid	Schram	Serpukhovian	Mazon Creek fossil beds	USA; Illinois	A mantis shrimp	

=== Insects ===
==== New taxa ====
Name	Novelty	Status	Authors	Age	Unit	Location	Notes	Images
Apterostigma electropilosum	Sp nov	Valid	Schultz	Burdigalian	Dominican amber	Dominican Republic	A myrmicin fungus farming ant	
Apterostigma eowilsoni	Sp nov	Valid	Schultz	Burdigalian	Dominican amber	Dominican Republic	A myrmicin fungus farming ant	
Cretadiamesa	Gen. et sp nov	Valid	Veltz, Azar & Nel	Early Cretaceous		Lebanon	A member of the family Chironomidae belonging to the subfamily Prodiamesinae. The type species is C. arieli.	
Cretapelopia	Gen. et sp nov	Valid	Veltz, Azar & Nel	Early Cretaceous		Lebanon	A member of the family Chironomidae belonging to the subfamily Tanypodinae and the tribe Pentaneurini. The type species is C. salomea.	
Dicromantispa electromexicana	Sp nov	Valid	Engel & Grimaldi	Late Oligocene - Early Miocene	Mexican Amber	Mexico	A mantidfly.	
Dicromantispa moronei	Sp nov	Valid	Engel & Grimaldi	Burdigalian	Dominican Amber	Dominican Republic	A mantidfly.	
Eophyllium	Gen et sp nov	Valid	Wedmann, Bradler, Rust	Eocene	Messel Pit fossil site	Germany	First leaf insect from the fossil record.	
Glisachaemus	Gen et sp nov	Valid	Szwedo	Early Eocene	Baltic amber	Europe	New planthopper genus.	
Lebanorthocladius	Gen. et sp nov	Valid	Veltz, Azar & Nel	Early Cretaceous		Lebanon	A member of the family Chironomidae belonging to the subfamily Orthocladiinae. The type species is L. furcatus.	
Libanodiamesa	Gen. et sp nov	Valid	Veltz, Azar & Nel	Early Cretaceous		Lebanon	A member of the family Chironomidae belonging to the subfamily Prodiamesinae. The type species is L. deploegi.	
Libanopelopia	Gen. et sp nov	Valid	Veltz, Azar & Nel	Early Cretaceous		Lebanon	A member of the family Chironomidae belonging to the subfamily Tanypodinae and the tribe Pentaneurini or Macropelopiini. The type species is L. cretacica.	
Mongolbittacus	Gen et sp nov	Valid	Petrulevicius, Huang & Ren	Middle Jurassic	Jiulongshan Formation	China	A bittacid	
Principiala	Gen et sp nov	Valid	Makarkin & Menon	Crato Formation	late Aptian	Brazil	An Ithonidae lacewing, type species P. incerta	
Sialis (Protosialis) casca	Sp nov	Jr synonym of Protosialis casca	Engel & Grimaldi	Burdigalian	Dominican Amber	Dominican Republic	The only alderfly from the West Indies fossil record.	
Schwenckfeldina archoica	Sp nov	Valid	Mohrig & Solórzano Kraemer	Late Oligocene - early Miocene	Mexican amber	Mexico	A Sciarid fly	
Wadelius	Gen. et sp nov	Valid	Veltz, Azar & Nel	Early Cretaceous		Lebanon	A member of the family Chironomidae belonging to the subfamily Tanypodinae and the tribe Anatopyniini. The type species is W. libanicus.	

== Fish ==
=== Bony fish ===
- Everhart, M. J. (2007). "Remains of a pycnodont fish (Actinopterygii: Pycnodontiformes) in a coprolite; An upper record of Micropycnodon kansasensis in the Smoky Hill Chalk, western Kansas". Transactions of the Kansas Academy of Science. 110 (1/2): 35–43. doi:10.1660/0022-8443(2007)110[35:ROAPFA]2.0.CO;2. S2CID 84547644.
- Cavin, L.; Suteethorn, V.; Buffetaut, E.; Claude, J.; Cuny, G.; Loeuff, J. Le; Tong, H. (2007). "The first sinamiid fish (Holostei, Halecomorpha) from Southeast Asia (Early Cretaceous of Thailand)". Journal of Vertebrate Paleontology. 27 (4): 827–837. doi:10.1671/0272-4634(2007)27[827:TFSFHH]2.0.CO;2. S2CID 85325978.
- Cavin, L.; Suteethorn, V.; Buffetaut, E.; Tong, H. (2007). "A new Thai Mesozoic lungfish (Sarcopterygii, Dipnoi) with an insight into post-Palaeozoic dipnoan evolution". Zoological Journal of the Linnean Society. 149 (2): 141–177. doi:10.1111/j.1096-3642.2007.00238.x.

=== Cartilaginous fish ===
- Everhart, M. J. (2007). "New stratigraphic records (Albian-Campanian) of the guitarfish, Rhinobatos sp. (Chondrichthyes; Rajiformes), from the Cretaceous of Kansas". Transactions of the Kansas Academy of Science. 110 (3–4): 225–235. doi:10.1660/0022-8443(2007)110[225:nsraor]2.0.co;2. S2CID 84920949.

== Archosauromorphs ==
=== Pseudosuchians ===
Name	Novelty	Status	Authors	Age	Unit	Location	Notes	Images
Adamanasuchus	Gen. et sp. nov	Valid	Lucas; Hunt; Spielmann	Late Triassic	Petrified Forest Formation	United States	An aetosaur.	
Arganasuchus	Gen. et sp. nov	Valid	Jalil; Karin	Late Triassic	Timezgadiouine Formation	Morocco	A rauisuchian.	
Barinasuchus	Gen. et sp. nov	Valid	Paolillo; Linares	Late Eocene/Middle Miocene	Parángula Formation, Ipururo Formation & Divisadero Largo Formation	Venezuela; Peru; Argentina	A sebecid.	Barinasuchus.
Dollosuchoides	Gen. et sp. nov	Valid	Brochu	Middle Eocene		Belgium	A member of Tomistominae.	
Langstonia	Gen. nov	Valid	Paolillo; Linares	Middle Miocene	Villavieja Formation	Colombia	A sebecid; a new name for Sebecus huilensis.	Langstonia.
Montealtosuchus	Gen. et sp. nov	Valid	Carvalho; Vasconcellos; Tavares	Late Cretaceous	Adamantina Formation	Brazil	A member of Peirosauridae.	Montealtosuchus.
Neuquensuchus	Gen. et sp. nov	Valid	Fiorelli; Calvo	Late Cretaceous (Santonian)	Bajo de la Carpa Formation	Argentina	A member of Crocodyliformes of uncertain phylogenetic placement.	
Oceanosuchus	Gen. et sp. nov	Valid	Hua et al.	Late Cretaceous (Cenomanian)		France	A member of Pholidosauridae.	Oceanosuchus.
Voay	Gen. et comb. nov	Valid	Brochu	Pleistocene — Holocene		Madagascar	A new genus for "Crocodylus" robustus Grandidier & Vaillant (1872).	Voay.
Zulmasuchus	Gen. nov	Valid	Paolillo; Linares	Early Paleocene	Santa Lucia Formation	Bolivia	A sebecid; a new genus name for Sebecus querejazus.	

=== Pterosaurs ===
Name	Novelty	Status	Authors	Age	Unit	Location	Notes	Images
Aralazhdarcho	Gen et sp nov	Valid	Averianov	Santonian-early Campanian	Bostobe Svita	Kazakhstan	An azhdarchid	
Gegepterus	Gen et sp nov	Valid	Wang et al	Barremian–Aptian	Yixian Formation	China	A ctenochasmatid	
Tupandactylus	Gen et sp nov	Valid	Kellner & Campos	Early Cretaceous	Crato Formation	Brazil	A tapejarid	Tupandactylus.

=== Newly named non-dinosaurian dinosauromorphs ===
Name	Novelty	Status	Authors	Age	Unit	Location	Notes	Images
Dromomeron	Gen et sp nov	Valid	Irmis et al	Norian	Chinle Formation	Argentina; USA (Arizona, New Mexico and Texas)	A Lagerpetonidae dinosauromorph reptile	Dromomeron

=== Newly named non-avian dinosauromorphs ===
Data courtesy of George Olshevky's dinosaur genera list.

Name	Novelty	Status	Authors	Age	Unit	Location	Notes	Images
Achillesaurus	Gen et sp nov	Valid	Martinelli & Vera	Santonian	Bajo de la Carpa Formation	Argentina	An alvarezsaurid	Achillesaurus
Albertaceratops	Gen et sp nov	Valid	Ryan	Campanian	Oldman Formation	Canada	A Centrosaurine. the Ceratopsian from Alberta.	Albertaceratops
Amargatitanis	Gen et sp nov	Valid	Apesteguía	Barremian	La Amarga Formation	Argentina	A titanosaur	
Asylosaurus	Gen et sp nov	Valid	Galton	Rhaetian		England	A basal sauropodomorph	
Australodocus	Gen et sp nov	Valid	Remes	Late Jurassic	Tendaguru Beds	Tanzania	A diplodocid	
Berberosaurus	Gen et sp nov	Valid	Allain et al	Pliensbachian-Toarcian	Toundoute Continental Series	Morocco	A ceratosaur	
Cedrorestes	Gen et sp nov	Valid	Gilpin, DiCroce, & Carpenter	Barremian	Cedar Mountain Formation	USA (Utah)	A hadrosaur	
Cerasinops	Gen et sp nov	Valid	Chinnery & Horner	Campanian	Two Medicine Formation	USA (Montana)	A ceratopsian	Cerasinops
Dongbeititan	Gen et sp nov	Valid	Wang et al	Early Cretaceous	Yixian Formation	China	A sauropod	
Eocursor	Gen et sp nov	Valid	Butler, Smith, & Norman	Norian	Lower Elliot Formation	South Africa	An Early ornithischian	Eocursor
Eotriceratops	Gen et sp nov	Valid	Wu, Brinkman, Eberth, & Braman	Maastrichtian	Horseshoe Canyon Formation	Canada (Alberta)	A Ceratopsian	Eotriceratops
Futalognkosaurus	Gen et sp nov	Valid	Calvo, Porfiri, González-Riga, & Kellner	Coniacian	Portezuelo Formation	Argentina	A titanosaurian	Futalognkosaurus
Gigantoraptor	Gen et sp nov	Valid	Xu, et al	Campanian-Maastrichtian	Iren Dabasu Formation	China	A Giantoviraptorosaurian	Gigantoraptor
Jiangjunosaurus	Gen et sp nov	Valid	Jia, Forster, Xing, and Clark	Oxfordian	Shishugou Formation	China	A stegosaurian	
Lamplughsaura	Gen et sp nov	Valid	Kutty, Chatterjee, Galton, & Upchurch	Sinemurian	Dharmaram Formation	India	An Early Sauropodomorph.	Lamplughsaura
Lophostropheus	Gen et sp nov	Valid	Ezcurra & Cuny	Rhaetian-Hettangian	Moon-Airel Formation	France	A coelophysoid	
Luanchuanraptor	Gen et sp nov	Valid	Lü et al	Late Cretaceous	Qiupa Formation	China		
Mahakala	Gen et sp nov	Valid	Turner et al	Campanian	Djadokhta Formation	Mongolia	A Deinonychosaur.	Mahakala
Muyelensaurus	Gen et sp nov	Valid	Calvo, González-Riga, & Porfiri	Late Cretaceous		Argentina	A titanosaurian	
Nanningosaurus	Gen et sp nov	Valid	Mo, Zhao, Wang, & Xu	Late Cretaceous	Nalong Basin	China	A hadrosaurid	
Nopcsaspondylus	Gen et sp nov	Valid	Apesteguía	Coniacian	Candeleros Formation	Argentina	A rebbachisaurid	Nopcsaspondylus
Oryctodromeus	Gen et sp nov	Valid	David J. Varricchio, Anthony J. Martin, & Yoshihiro Katsura	Cenomanian	Blackleaf Formation	USA (Montana)	An ornithopod	Oryctodromeus
Paluxysaurus	Gen et sp nov	jr synonym	Rose	Albian	Twin Mountains Formation		Jr synonym of Sauroposeidon	
Pantydraco	Gen et sp nov	Valid	Galton, Yates, & Kermack	Late Triassic		Wales	A basal sauropodomorph	Pantydraco
Pradhania	Gen et sp nov	Valid	Kutty, Chatterjee, Galton, & Upchurch	Sinemurian	Upper Dharmaram Formation	India	A massospondylid	
Shanag	Gen et sp nov	Valid	Turner, Hwang, & Norell	Berriasian-Barremian	Öösh Formation	Mongolia	A dromaeosaurid	
Sinocalliopteryx	Gen et sp nov	Valid	Ji et al	Barremian–Aptian	Yixian Formation	China	A compsognathid	Sinocalliopteryx
Suzhousaurus	Gen et sp nov	Valid	Li et al	Albian	Xinminpu Group	China	A therizinosauroid	Suzhousaurus
Urbacodon	Gen et sp nov	Valid	Averianov & Sues	Cenomanian	Dzharakuduk Formation	Uzbekistan	A troodontid	
‘’Velafrons’’	Gen et sp nov	Valid			Cerro del Pueblo Formation	Mexico	a hadrosaur	
Zhejiangosaurus	Gen et sp nov	Valid	Lü et al	Cenomanian	Chaochuan Formation	China	A nodosaurid	
Zhongyuansaurus	Gen et sp nov	Valid	Xu et al	Cretaceous		China	An ankylosaurid	
Zhuchengosaurus	Gen et sp nov	Jr synonym	Zhao et al	Late Cretaceous	Wangshi Formation		Junior synonym of Shantungosaurus	

=== Newly named birds ===
Name	Novelty	Status	Authors	Age	Unit	Location	Notes	Images
Alethoalaornis agitornis	Gen. nov. et Sp. nov.	Valid	Li Li Hu Dong-yu Duan Ye Gong En-pu Hou Lianhai	Early Cretaceous	Jiufotang Formation	China	An Alethoalaornithidae Li, Hu, Duan, Gong et Hou, 2007, Enantiornithes Walker, 1981.	
Baptornis varneri	Sp. nov.	Valid	James E. Martin Amanda Cordes-Person	Late Cretaceous	Early-Middle Campanian	USA (South Dakota)	Described in Baptornithidae, Hesperornithiformes, transferred to Brodavis Martin, Kurochkin et Tokaryk, 2012, Brodavidae, Hesperornithiformes.	
Belonopterus lilloi	Sp. nov.	Valid	Marcos M. Cenizo Federico L. Agnolin	Late Pliocene-Early Pleistocene	Miramar Formation	Argentina	A Charadriidae, lapwing, a relative of the southern lapwing.	
Berruornis halbedeli	Sp. nov.	Valid	Gerald Mayr	Paleocene		Germany	A Sophiornithidae, Strigiformes.	
?Borvocarbo stoeffelensis	Sp. nov.	Valid	Gerald Mayr	Late Oligocene	MP 28	: Germany	First described as ?Oligocorax sp. Mayr, 2001, than as ?Borvocarbo stoeffelensis Mayr, 2007. In 2014 Mayr transferred the species back as ?Oligocorax stoeffelensis (Mayr, 2007).	
Dunstanetta johnstoneorum	Gen. nov. et Sp. nov.	Valid	Trevor H. Worthy Alan J. D. Tennyson C. Jones J. A. McNamara J. Douglas	Early-Middle Miocene	Bannockburn Formation	New Zealand	An Anatidae.	
Elsornis keni	Gen. nov. et Sp. nov.	Valid	Luis M. Chiappe Shigeru Suzuki Gareth J. Dyke Mahito Watabe K. Tsogtbaatar Rinchen Barsbold	Late Cretaceous	Campanian, Djadokhta Formation	Mongolia	An Enantiornithes Walker, 1981.	
Euroceros bulgaricus	Gen. nov. et Sp. nov.	Valid	Zlatozar N. Boev Dimitar Kovachev	Late Miocene	Turolian-Meotian, MN 11-12	Bulgaria	A Bucorvidae.	
Fissuravis weigelti	Gen. nov. et Sp. nov.	Valid	Gerald Mayr	?Upper Middle Paleocene	?MP 5	Germany	Described in cf. Lithornithidae, Lithornithiformes, Palaeognathae.	
Gallirallus epulare	Sp. nov.	Valid	Jeremy J. Kirchman David W. Steadman	Subrecent	Nuku Hiva	French Polynesia	A Rallidae.	
Gallirallus gracilitibia	Sp. nov.	Valid	Jeremy J. Kirchman David W. Steadman	Subrecent	Ua Huka	French Polynesia	A Rallidae.	
Gallirallus roletti	Sp. nov.	Valid	Jeremy J. Kirchman David W. Steadman	Subrecent	Tahuata	French Polynesia	A Rallidae.	
Gradiornis walbeckensis	Gen. nov et Sp. nov.	Valid	Gerald Mayr	Upper Middle Paleocene	?MP 5	Germany	Described in cf. Cariamae sensu Olson, 1985.	
Icadyptes salasi	Gen. nov et Sp. nov.	Valid	Julia A. Clarke Daniel T. Ksepka Marcello Stucchi Mario Urbina Norberto Giannini Sara Bertelli Yanina Narvaez Clint A. Boyd	Late Eocene	Otuma Formation	Peru	A Spheniscidae from Peru.	
Kelenken guillermoi	Gen. nov. et Sp. nov.	Valid	Sara Bertelli Luis M. Chiappe Claudia Tambussi	Middle Miocene	Collón Cura Formation	Argentina	A Phorusrhacidae.	Kelenken guillermoi
Madryornis mirandus	Gen. nov et Sp. nov.	Valid	Carolina Acosta Hospitaleche Claudia Tambussi Mariano Donato Mario Cozzuol	Early Late Miocene	Puerto Madryn Formation	Argentina	A Spheniscidae from Chubut Province.	
Manuherikia lacustrina	Gen. nov. et Sp. nov.	Valid	Trevor H. Worthy Alan J. D. Tennyson C. Jones J. A. McNamara J. Douglas	Early-Middle Miocene	Bannockburn Formation	New Zealand	An Anatidae.	
Manuherikia minuta	Gen. nov. et Sp. nov.	Valid	Trevor H. Worthy Alan J. D. Tennyson C. Jones J. A. McNamara J. Douglas	Early-Middle Miocene	Bannockburn Formation	New Zealand	An Anatidae.	
Martinavis cruzyensis	Gen. nov. et Sp. nov.	Valid	Cyril A. Walker Eric Buffetaut Gareth J. Dyke	Late Cretaceous, Late Campanian-Early Maastrichtian	Grès à Reptiles Formation	France	An Enantiornithes Walker, 1981, this is the type species of the new genus.	
Martinavis vincei	Sp. nov.	Valid	Cyril A. Walker Eric Buffetaut Gareth J. Dyke	Late Cretaceous, Late Maastrichtian	Lecho Formation	Argentina	An Enantiornithes Walker, 1981.	
Matanas enrighti	Gen. nov. et Sp. nov.	Valid	Trevor H. Worthy Alan J. D. Tennyson C. Jones J. A. McNamara J. Douglas	Early-Middle Miocene	Bannockburn Formation	New Zealand	A possible Anatidae.	
Miotadorna sanctibathansi	Gen. nov. et Sp. nov.	Valid	Trevor H. Worthy Alan J. D. Tennyson C. Jones J. A. McNamara J. Douglas	Early-Middle Miocene	Bannockburn Formation	New Zealand	A possible Anatidae.	
Pampaemberiza olrogii	Gen. nov. et Sp. nov.	Valid	Federico L. Agnolin	Middle Pleistocene		Argentina	An Emberizidae Passeriformes. This is the type species of the new genus.	
Paraprotopteryx gracilis	Gen. nov. et Sp. nov.	Valid	Zheng Xiaoting Zhang Zihui Hou Lianhan	Early Cretaceous	Yixian Formation	China	An Enantiornithes Walker, 1981.	
Pelecanoides miokuaka	Gen. nov. et Sp. nov.	Valid	Trevor H. Worthy Alan J. D. Tennyson C. Jones J. A. McNamara J. Douglas	Early-Middle Miocene	Bannockburn Formation	New Zealand	A Pelecanoididae.	
Perudyptes devriesi	Gen. nov et Sp. nov.	Valid	Julia A. Clarke Daniel T. Ksepka Marcello Stucchi Mario Urbina Norberto Giannini Sara Bertelli Yanina Narváez Clint A. Boyd	Middle Eocene	Paracas Formation	Peru	Another Spheniscidae from Peru.	
Spheniscus muizoni	Sp. nov.	Valid	Ursula B. Göhlich	Late Middle-Early Late Miocene	Pisco Formation	Peru	Another Spheniscidae from Peru.	
Turnipax oechslerorum	Sp. nov.	Valid	Gerald Mayr Charles W. Knopf	Early Oligocene	Rupelian	Germany	A stem Turnicidae.	
Vastanavis eocaena	Gen. Nov. et Sp. nov.	Valid	Gerald Mayr Rajendra S. Rana Ashok Sahni Thierry Smith	Early Eocene, Ypresian	Cambay Formation	India	A stem Psittaciformes, Vastanavidae G. Mayr, Rana, Rose, Sahni, Kumar, Sing et T. Smith, 2010.	
Walbeckornis creber	Sp. nov.	Valid	Gerald Mayr	Paleocene		Germany	Infraorder Cariamides.	

== Lepidosauromorpha ==
=== Plesiosaurs ===
- Everhart, M. J. (2007). "Historical note on the 1884 discovery of Brachauchenius lucasi (Plesiosauria; Pliosauridae) in Ottawa County, Kansas". Transactions of the Kansas Academy of Science. 110 (3–4): 255–258. doi:10.1660/0022-8443(2007)110[255:hnotdo]2.0.co;2. S2CID 86180150.
- Everhart, M. J. (2007). "Use of archival photographs to rediscover the locality of the Holyrood elasmosaur (Ellsworth County, Kansas)". Transactions of the Kansas Academy of Science. 110 (1/2): 135–143. doi:10.1660/0022-8443(2007)110[135:uoaptr]2.0.co;2. S2CID 86051586.

Name	Status	Location	Authors	Notes
Eopolycotylus	Valid	USA	Albright; Gillette; Titus	
Pahasapasaurus	Valid	USA	Schumacher	
Palmula	Renamed Palmulasaurus, as preoccupied by a genus of foraminifera.	USA	Albright; Gillette; Titus	
Palmulasaurus	Valid	USA	Albright; Gillette; Titus	

== Synapsids ==
=== Non-mammalian ===
Name	Status	Authors	Age	Location	Notes	Images
Charassognathus	Valid	Botha; Abdala; Smith	257 million years ago	South Africa		Charassognathus
Deccanodon	Valid	Narth; Yadagiri	231 million years ago	India		
Katumbia	Valid	Angielczyk	256 million years ago	Tanzania; Zambia	New genus for "Cryptocynodon" parringtoni	
Lophorhinus	Valid	Sidor; Smith	256 million years ago	South Africa		Lophorhinus

=== Mammals ===
Name	Status	Authors	Age	Unit	Location	Notes	Images
Africanacetus	Valid	Bianucci et al.	Miocene	Banzare Bank, south	South Africa; Eritrea; Mozambique		
Junggaroperadectes	Valid	Ni; Meng; Wu; Ye	Early Oligocene	Keziletuogayi Formation	China	A peradectine marsupial	
Nakalipithecus	Valid	Kunimatsu; Nakatsukasa; et al. (Note: Kunimatsu, Nakatsukasa, Sawada, Sakai, Hyodo, Hyodo, Itaya, Nakaya, Saegusa, Mazurier, Saneyoshi, Tsujikawa, Yamamoto, Mbua.)	Tortonian	Nakali Formation	Kenya		
Vulpes riffautae	Valid	De Bonis et al.	Late Miocene		Chad		

== Footnotes ==
=== Complete author list ===
As science becomes more collaborative, papers with large numbers of authors are becoming more common. To prevent the deformation of the tables, these footnotes list the contributors to papers that erect new genera and have many authors.
