= Sialis koreana =

Scientific classification
- Domain: Eukaryota
- Kingdom: Animalia
- Phylum: Arthropoda
- Class: Insecta
- Order: Megaloptera
- Family: Sialidae
- Genus: Sialis
- Species: S. koreana

Binomial name
- Sialis koreana Jung & Bae, 2012

Species of insect

Sialis koreana is a species of alderfly belonging to the order Megaloptera family Sialidae.

The species was first described in 2012 by Sang Woo Jung and Yeon Jae Bae.

The larvae are carnivorous. The adults do not feed and appear from late March to early June.

== Distribution ==
The species is endemic to the Korean Peninsula

== Habitat ==
This alderfly is found in the province of Gangwon-do, on the high moor, Yongneup of Mt. Daeam, in high-altitude wetlands, in cold, still waters, at over 1,000 m above sea level.
