= Protosialis casca =

Protosialis casca Temporal range: Burdigalian

Scientific classification
- Domain: Eukaryota
- Kingdom: Animalia
- Phylum: Arthropoda
- Class: Insecta
- Order: Megaloptera
- Family: Sialidae
- Genus: Protosialis
- Species: †P. casca

Binomial name
- †Protosialis casca Engel & Grimaldi, 2007

Synonyms
- Sialis (Protosialis) casca

Extinct species of insect

Protosialis casca is an extinct species of alderfly in the Sialidae subfamily Sialinae. The species is solely known from the early Miocene, Burdigalian stage, Dominican amber deposits on the island of Hispaniola. Protosialis casca is one of only two known alderfly species present in the West Indies, the only other species is the living Protosialis bifasciata native to Cuba.

== History and classification ==
The species is known only from the holotype, number "Mact 2090", which is a single male specimen currently residing in the private collection owned by Ettore Morone of Turin, Italy, and was first studied by Michael Engel and David Grimaldi. Engel and Grimaldi's 2007 type description paper was published in the journal American Museum Novitates. The specific epithet "casca" was derived by the authors from the Latin cascus, which translates to "old" in reference to the age of the specimen.

When first described P. casca was named Sialis (Protosialis) casca by Engel and Grimaldi. They used the alderfly classification system put forth by Dr. Michael Whiting in his 1994 paper on the phylogeny of North American alderflies which treated Protosialis as a subgenus of Sialis. Currently most taxonomists treat Protosialis as a separate genus from Sialis making this species Protosialis casca and Sialis (Protosialis) casca a synonym.

== Description ==
The holotype of Protosialis casca is 7.6 millimetres (0.30 in) in length with a forewing length of between 7.7–8.4 millimetres (0.30–0.33 in). The forewing length cannot be determined more precisely due to the apical portions of the wings being missing. The orange and black coloration of the head and pronotum combined with the reduced number of crossveins in the costal region of the forewing are unique to the genus Protosialis. The legs display black and white color patterning, with the area of the protibia and mesotibia white and the rest of the leg is black. The wing membranes are overall a dusky brownish gray, with veins a darker brow to black. The abdomen, light brown in color, is bent downwards near the midpoint and slightly distended.
