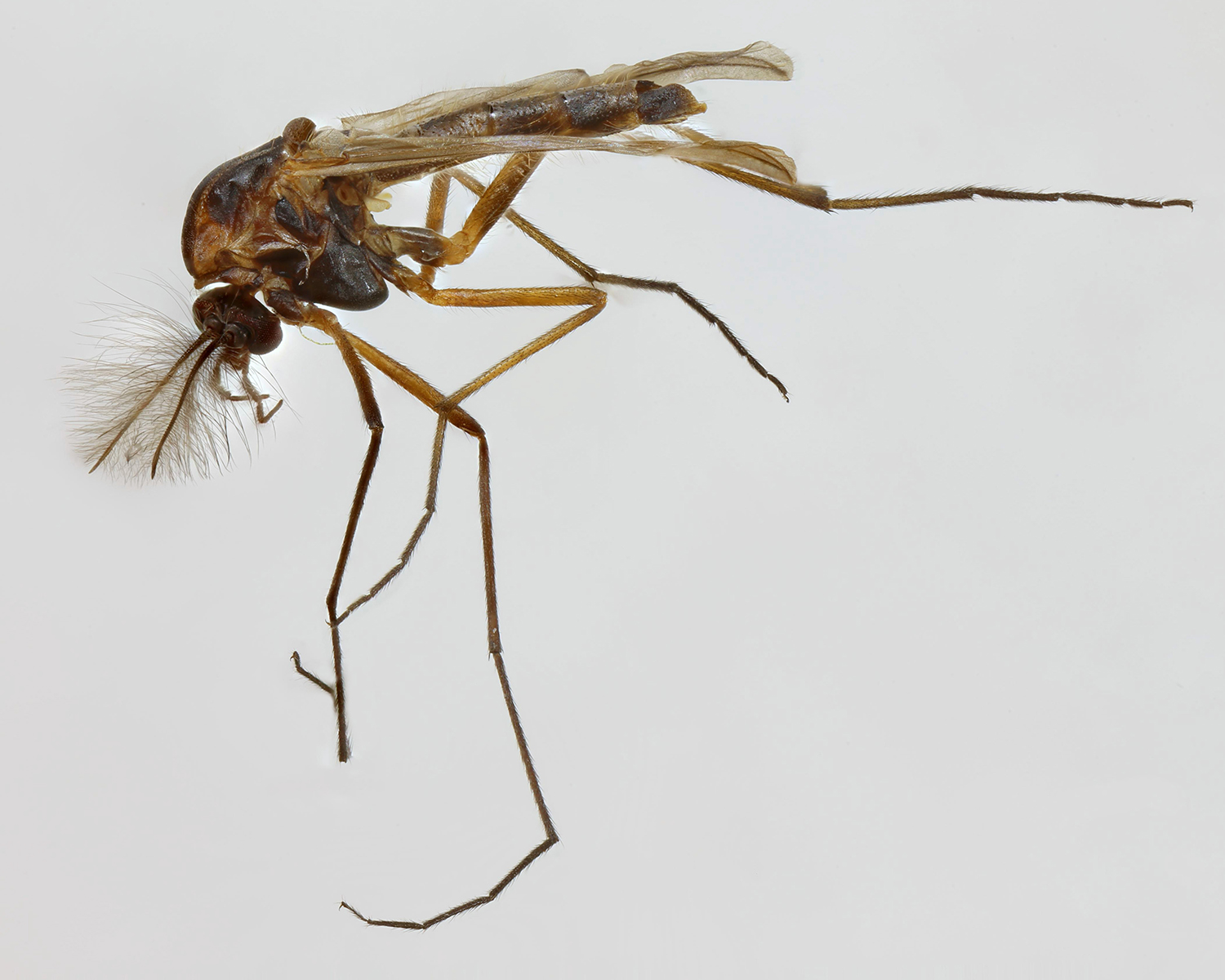
- Prodiamesa olivacea

Scientific classification
- Kingdom: Animalia
- Phylum: Arthropoda
- Clade: Pancrustacea
- Class: Insecta
- Order: Diptera
- Family: Chironomidae
- Subfamily: Prodiamesinae

Genera
- See text

= Prodiamesinae =

Prodiamesinae Temporal range: Barremian–Holocene

Subfamily of midges

Prodiamesinae is a subfamily of midges in the non-biting midge family (Chironomidae).

== Extant genera & species ==
- Genus Compteromesa Saether, 1981

- C. oconeensis Saether, 1981

- Genus Monodiamesa Kieffer, 1922

- M. bathyphila (Kieffer, 1918)
- M. depectinata Saether, 1973
- M. ekmani (Brundin, 1949)
- M. prolilobata Saether, 1973
- M. tuberculata Saether, 1973

- Genus Odontomesa Pagast, 1947

- O. ferringtoni Saether, 1985
- O. fulva (Kieffer, 1919)
- O. lutosopra (Garrett, 1925)

- Genus Prodiamesa Kieffer, 1906

- P. cubita Garrett, 1925
- P. olivacea (Meigen, 1818)
- P. rufovittata Goetghebuer, 1932

== Extinct genera ==
- †Cretadiamesa Veltz et al, 2007
  - C. arieli (Lebanese amber, Barremian)
- †Libanodiamesa Veltz et al, 2007
  - L. deploegi Veltz et al, 2007 (Lebanese amber, Barremian)
  - L. simpsoni Baranov et al. 2018 (Wealden amber, Wessex Formation, Barremian)
- †Paicheleria Azar and Nel 2010
  - P. magnifica (Lebanese amber, Barremian)
