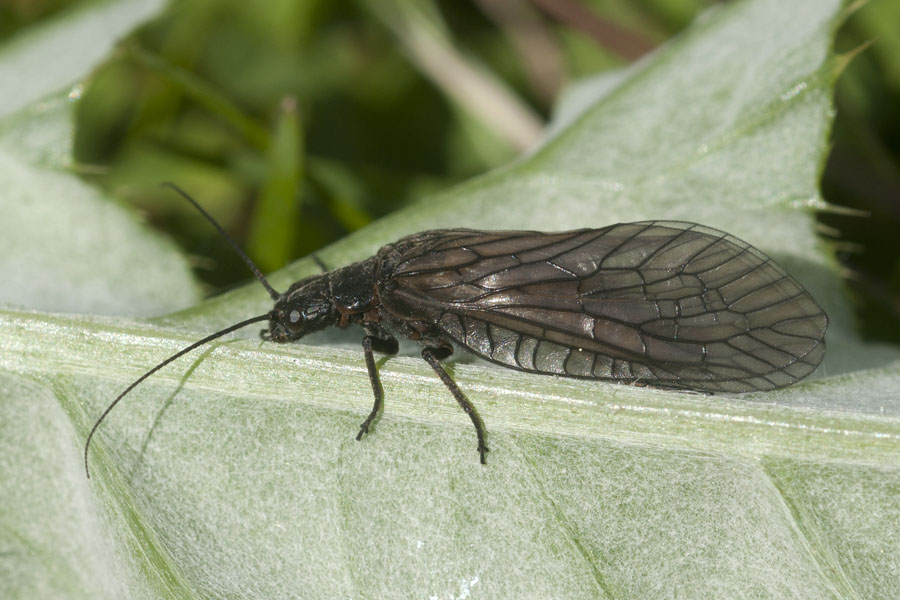

Scientific classification
- Domain: Eukaryota
- Kingdom: Animalia
- Phylum: Arthropoda
- Class: Insecta
- Order: Megaloptera
- Family: Sialidae
- Genus: Sialis
- Species: S. fuliginosa

Binomial name
- Sialis fuliginosa Pictet, 1836

= Sialis fuliginosa =

Species of alderfly

Sialis fuliginosa is a species of alderfly found in Europe and the United Kingdom.
