= Odontomesa =

Scientific classification
- Kingdom: Animalia
- Phylum: Arthropoda
- Clade: Pancrustacea
- Class: Insecta
- Order: Diptera
- Family: Chironomidae
- Subfamily: Prodiamesinae
- Genus: Odontomesa; Pagast, 1947

Species
- See text

Genus of flies

Odontomesa is a genus of midges in the non-biting midge family (Chironomidae).

== Species ==
- O. ferringtoni Sæther, 1985
- O. fulva (Kieffer, 1919)
- O. lutosopra (Garrett, 1925)
