= Prodiamesa =

Scientific classification
- Kingdom: Animalia
- Phylum: Arthropoda
- Clade: Pancrustacea
- Class: Insecta
- Order: Diptera
- Family: Chironomidae
- Subfamily: Prodiamesinae
- Genus: Prodiamesa; Kieffer, 1906

Species
- See text

Genus of flies

Prodiamesa is a genus of midges in the non-biting midge family (Chironomidae).

== Species ==
- Prodiamesa cubita Garrett, 1925
- Prodiamesa olivacea (Meigen, 1818)
- Prodiamesa rufovittata Goetghebuer, 1932
