= Orontium mackii =

Orontium mackii Temporal range: Late Cretaceous (Maastrichtian?)

Scientific classification
- Kingdom: Plantae
- Clade: Tracheophytes
- Clade: Angiosperms
- Clade: Monocots
- Order: Alismatales
- Family: Araceae
- Genus: Orontium
- Species: †O. mackii

Binomial name
- †Orontium mackii Bogner, Johnson, Kvaček & Upchurch

Extinct species of flowering plant

Orontium mackii is an extinct golden club species in the family Araceae described from a series of isolated fossil leaves. The species is known from Late Cretaceous sediments exposed in the state of New Mexico in the United States of America. It is one of several extinct species placed in the living golden-club genus Orontium.

== History and classification ==
Orontium mackii has been identified from a series of three exposures in the Jose Creek member of the McRae Formation. These outcrops, near Truth or Consequences, New Mexico, are all from the same horizon of a volcanic ash fall and are separated by a distance of 50–100 metres (160–330 ft), preserving a warm to subtropical environment in and along a river system. The Jose Creek member is dated as probable Maastrichtian, based on the conformable contact between the Jose Creek member and the overlying Hall Creek member. In addition the site hosts a grouping of conifer megafossils which is comparable to that found in other southern and central North American fossil sites of Maastrichtian age. Of the three sites from which O. mackii is known, two preserve a typical wet environment which had standing water and wet soil conditions, as is seen in modern O. aquaticum habitats. The third site for O. mackii differs, being found in a paleo-flood plain, which was made up of well-drained soils and no obligate aquatic plants. If this is a correct interpretation, it has been suggested that, unlike the other two species in the genus, O. mackii was not dependent on wetland or aquatic conditions for survival.

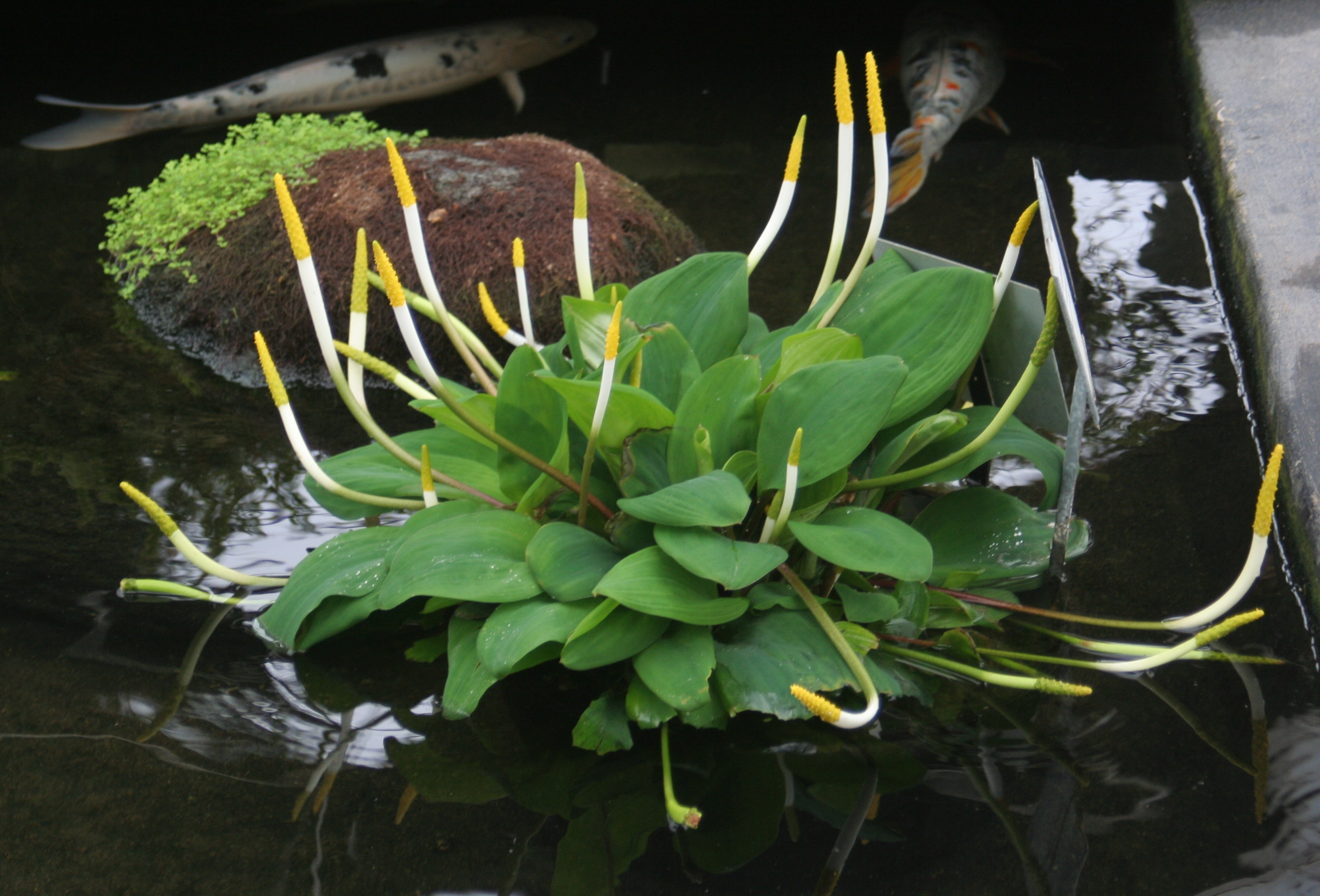
A living relative, O. aquaticum

The species was described from a type specimen, the holotype TXSTATE-1001, and a group of five paratypes, all of which are currently preserved in the paleobotanical collections housed at the Texas State University, in San Marcos, Texas. The specimens were studied by a group of paleobotanists led by Josef Bogner, with the team publishing their 2007 type description for O. mackii in the Journal Zitteliana. The etymology of the chosen specific name mackii is in recognition of Gregory H. Mack, in honor of his longtime contributions to New Mexico geology, and for discovering the site which produced O. mackii.

== Description ==
The leaves of O. mackii are an elliptical oblong shape overall, being over 275 millimetres (10.8 in) long, though the full length is unknown. The leaves range from 60–90 millimetres (2.4–3.5 in) in width, with a leaf petiole that is over 100 millimetres (3.9 in) long. The leaf tips are not known, due to the incomplete nature of the fossils found. As such, it is not certain whether O. mackii had leaf tips which were hooded in shape as are the leaves of both O. wolfei and O. aquaticum. The lateral veins of the leaves are composed of only two orders and are connected by a single order of crossveins while the midrib of the leaves is most distinct towards the leaf base. In the fossils the midrib is noted for a tendency to accumulate iron oxides.
