= Daeamsan =

Mountain in South Korea

Coordinates: 38°12′40″N 128°08′06″E

Highest point
- Elevation: 1,304 m (4,278 ft)

Geography
- Location: South Korea

Korean name
- Hangul: 대암산
- Hanja: 大岩山
- RR: Daeamsan
- MR: Taeamsan

Daeamsan (Korean: 대암산) is a mountain in Gangwon Province, South Korea. It sits on the boundary between the counties of Inje and Yanggu. Daeamsan has an elevation of 1,304 m (4,278 ft).

== See also ==
- List of mountains in Korea
- The High Moor, Yongneup of Mt. Daeam
