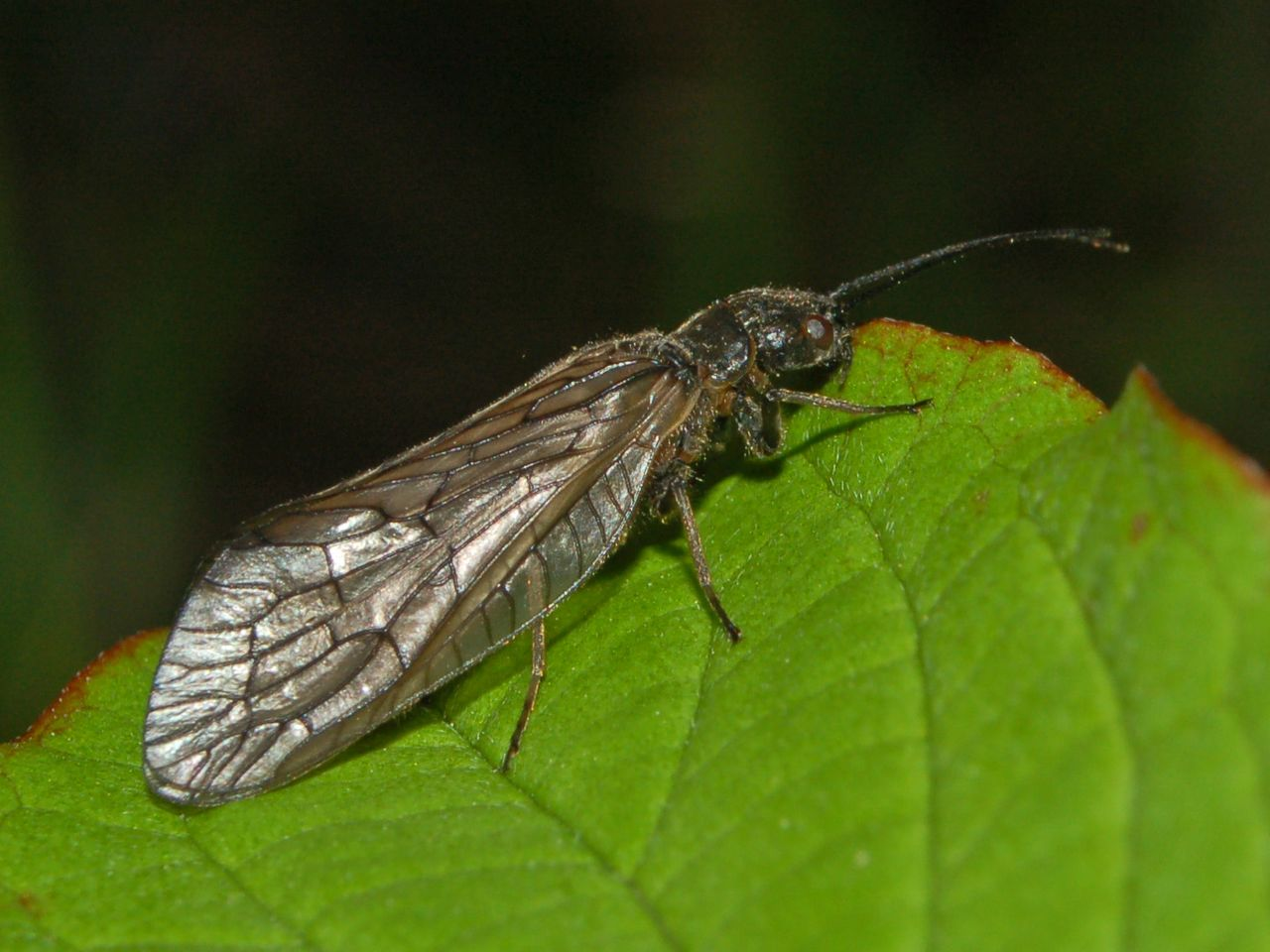
- Sialis lutaria. Side view

Scientific classification
- Kingdom: Animalia
- Phylum: Arthropoda
- Class: Insecta
- Order: Megaloptera
- Family: Sialidae
- Genus: Sialis
- Species: S. lutaria

Binomial name
- Sialis lutaria (Linnaeus, 1758)

Synonyms
- Hemerobius lutarius Linnaeus, 1758

= Sialis lutaria =

Species of insect

Sialis lutaria, common name alderfly, is a species of alderfly belonging to the order Megaloptera family Sialidae.

== Distribution ==
This species is mainly present in Austria, Belgium, United Kingdom, Czech Republic, France, Germany, Italy, the Netherlands, Spain, Poland, Romania and Switzerland.

== Habitat ==
Adults of this species usually inhabits ponds and slow-flowing streams, while the larvae live in mud and detritus under water.

== Description ==
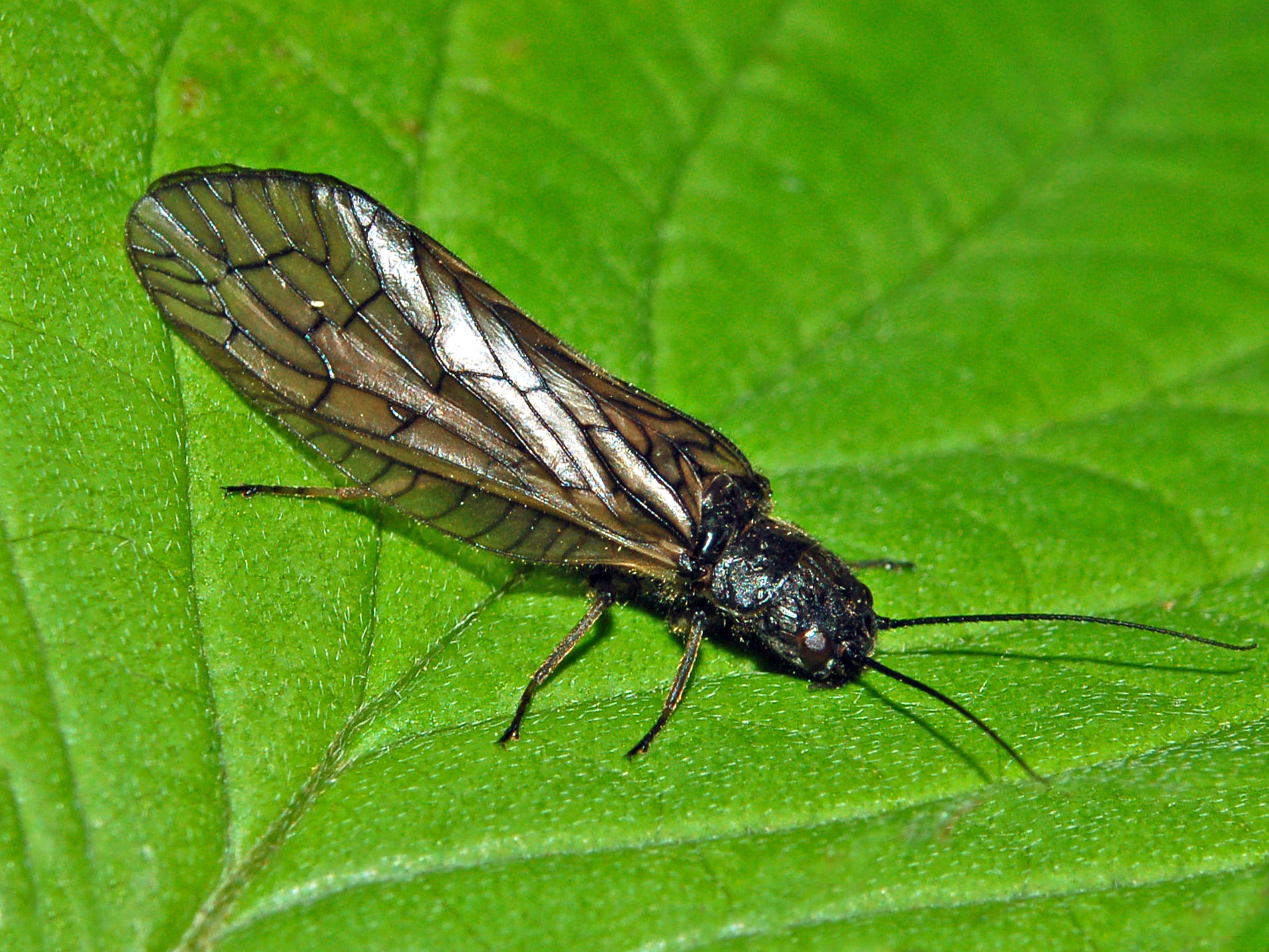
Dorsal view

Adults can reach 20 millimetres (0.79 in) of length, with a wingspan of 22–34 millimetres (0.87–1.34 in). They have a stocky body with a black or dark brown basic coloration, including head and legs. The wings are greyish, membranous and translucent, with pronounced dark venation. At rest they are held roof-like over their body.

The flat larvae reach approximately 17 millimetres (0.67 in). They have large heads, powerful jaws and three pairs of legs. Furthermore, they show feathery gills on the abdominal segments. The abdomen terminates with a long gill.

== Biology ==
Adults are most often encountered from May through June on vegetation near slow-flowing streams or close to ponds. They are bad fliers and never leave the waters where the larvae have developed.

Females lay a large quantity of eggs on plants overhanging the waters, where larvae will fall after hatching. Larvae are aquatic predators of small invertebrates and usually wait for their prey in silt or under stones just emerging from the water. The life cycle in this species lasts about one-two years, but the adults live two-three days only, without feeding.

== Gallery ==
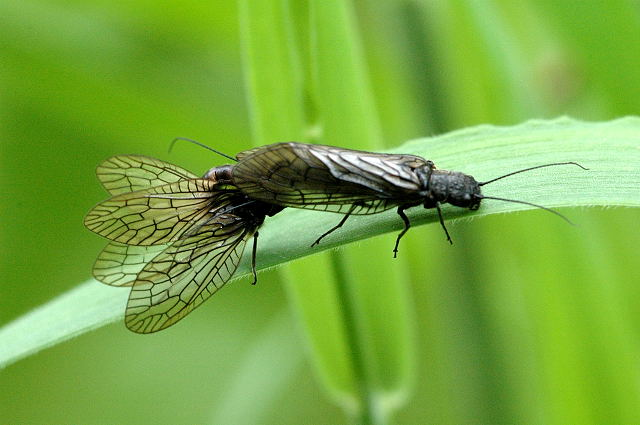
Mating

Oviposition on Juncus

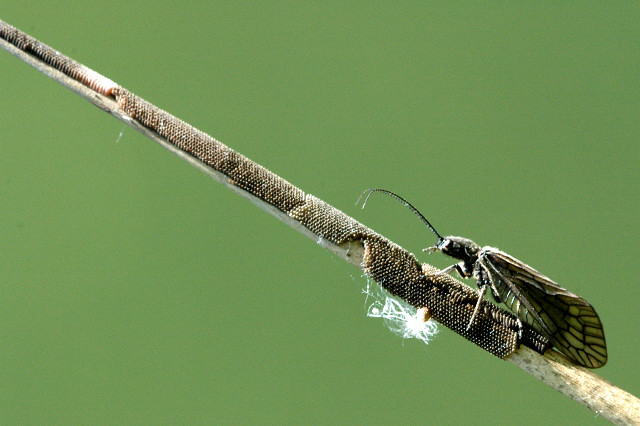
Female laying eggs

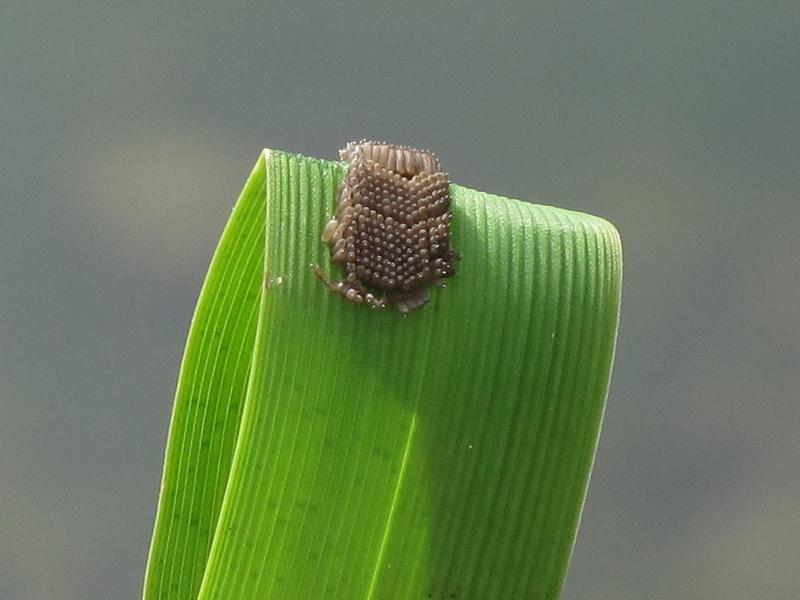
Eggs

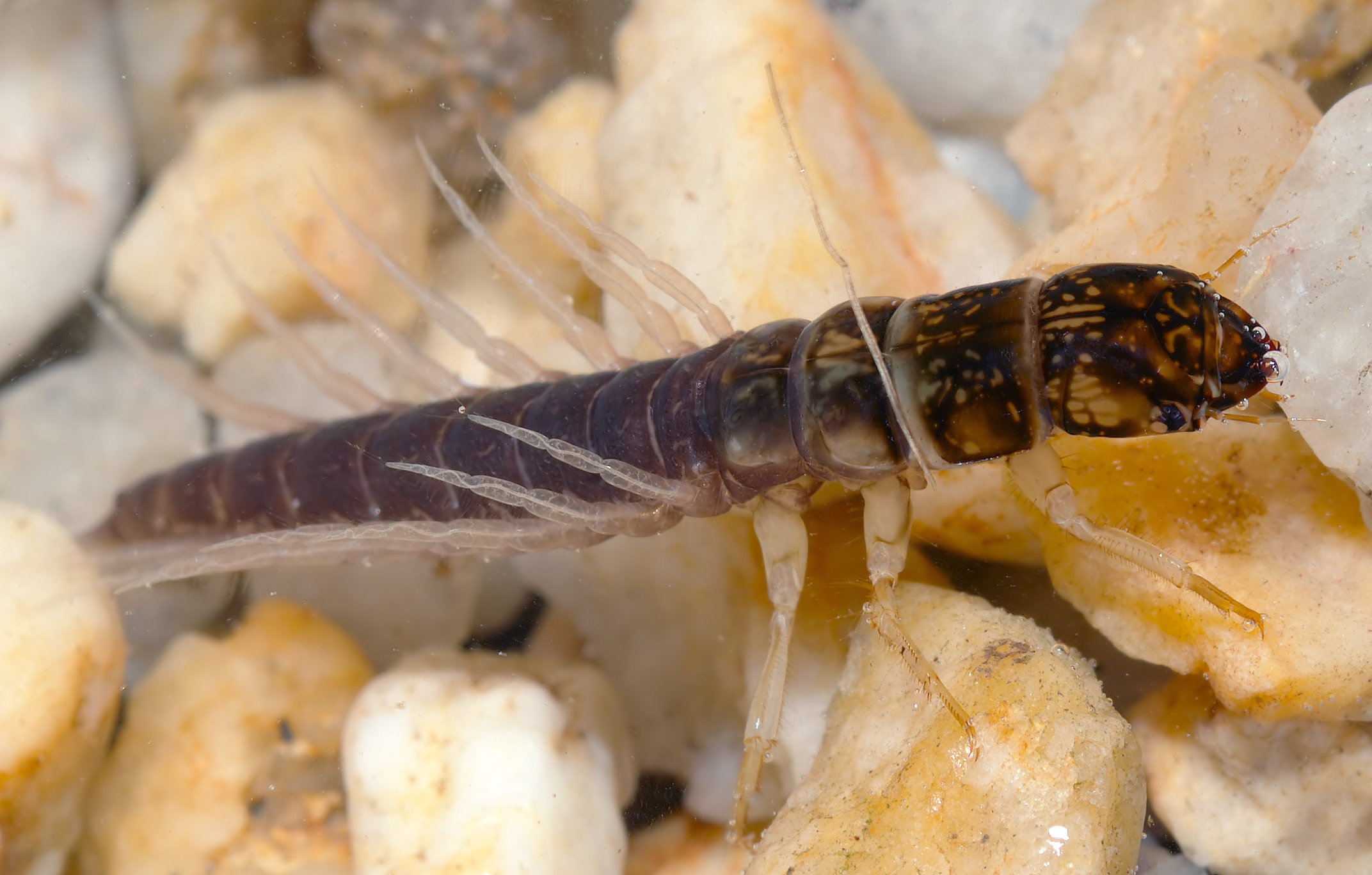
Larva
