= Compteromesa =

Scientific classification
- Kingdom: Animalia
- Phylum: Arthropoda
- Clade: Pancrustacea
- Class: Insecta
- Order: Diptera
- Family: Chironomidae
- Subfamily: Prodiamesinae
- Genus: Compteromesa; Sæther, 1981

Type species
- C. oconeensis Sæther, 1981

Species
- See text

Genus of flies

Compteromesa is a genus of midges in the non-biting midge family (Chironomidae).

== Species ==
- C. oconeensis Sæther, 1981
