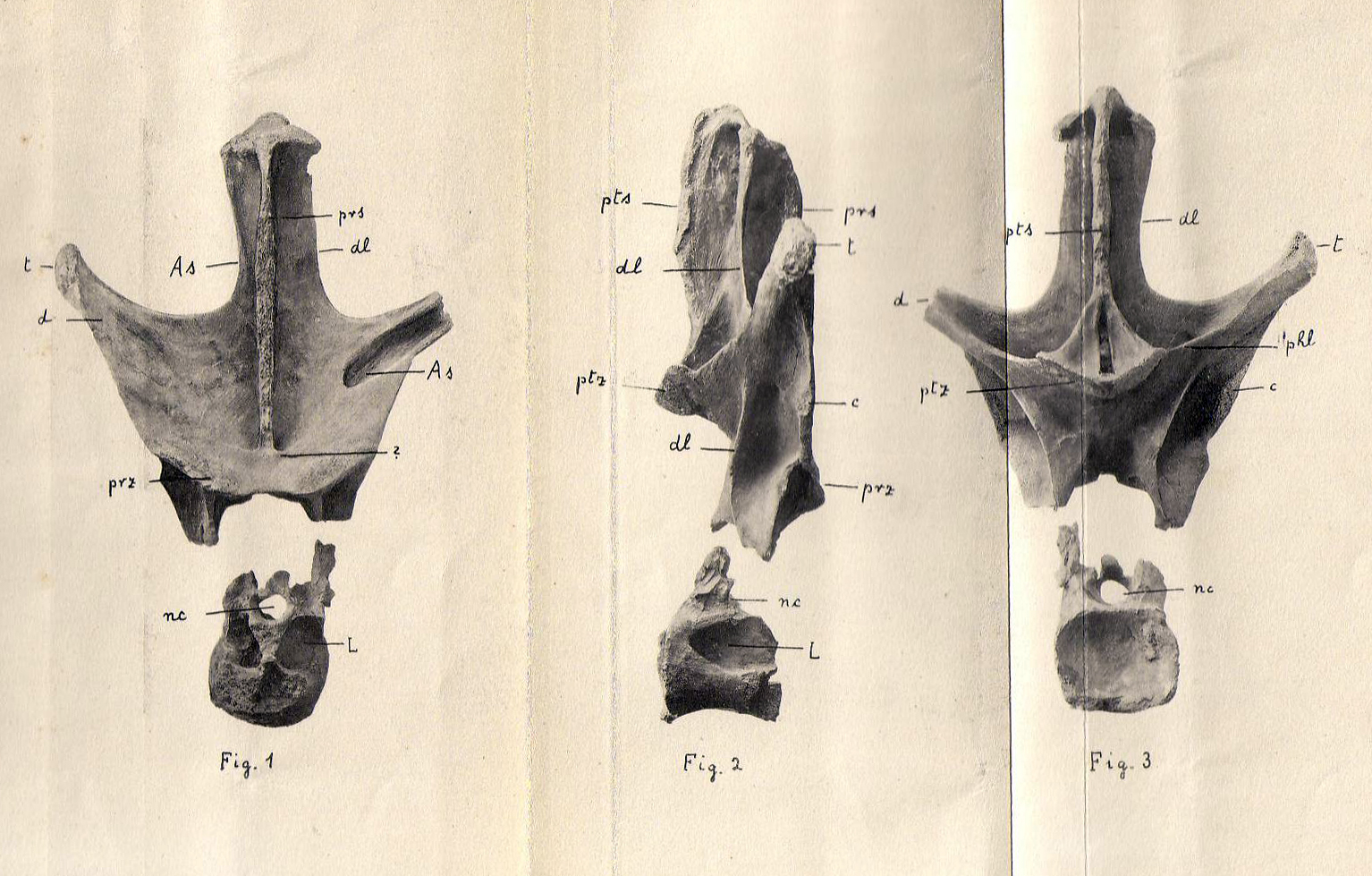
- Holotype dorsal vertebra of Nopcsaspondylus

Scientific classification
- Kingdom: Animalia
- Phylum: Chordata
- Class: Reptilia
- Clade: Dinosauria
- Clade: Saurischia
- Clade: †Sauropodomorpha
- Clade: †Sauropoda
- Clade: †Eusauropoda
- Superfamily: †Diplodocoidea
- Family: †Rebbachisauridae
- Genus: †Nopcsaspondylus; Apesteguía, 2007
- Species: †N. alarconensis

Binomial name
- †Nopcsaspondylus alarconensis Apesteguía, 2007

= Nopcsaspondylus =

Nopcsaspondylus Temporal range: Albian ~111–106 Ma

Extinct genus of dinosaurs

Nopcsaspondylus (meaning "Nopcsa's vertebra", in reference to the original describer) is a dubious genus of rebbachisaurid sauropod dinosaur from the Early Cretaceous (Albian) Candeleros Formation of Neuquén, Argentina. It is based on a now-lost back vertebra described by Nopcsa in 1902 but not named at the time. The specimen had a small vertebral body and large hollows, now known to be typical of rebbachisaurids.

== History of research ==
Skeletal diagram showing the now lost vertebra

The only known specimen of Nopcsaspondylus is a fossilized dorsal vertebra collected in 1889 by Slovenian researcher Hugo Zapałowicz and transferred to the geological collection of the University of Vienna. The first person known to study the specimen, Hungarian paleontologist Franz Nopcsa von Felső-Szilvás, described it in a 1902 publication and recognized it as belonging to a sauropod dinosaur, assigning it to the genus Bothriospondylus. According to Nopcsa, the label on the fossil stated that it was collected on the left bank of the Limay River in Argentina, about 80 kilometers south of the confluence of the Limay and Neuquén rivers. A year later, American paleontologist John Bell Hatcher claimed that this vertebra was indistinguishable from those of Haplocanthosaurus, a sauropod known from Colorado, and that while the Argentine vertebra does not undoubtedly represent the same genus as the Colorado material, the two are very similar in structure. The vertebra would next be studied by German paleontologist Friedrich von Huene, who wrote a monograph published in 1929 in which he reassigns the material to the species Titanosaurus australis, and the locality from which it originates is named as Alarcón for the first time.

The Nopcsaspondylus specimen would not be published on again until the release of The Dinosauria in 1990, in which the vertebra was deemed similar to those found in northern Africa of Rebbachisaurus garasbae, supposedly extending the range of the Rebbachisaurus genus into South America as well. Five years afterwards, Argentine paleontologists Jorge O. Calvo and Leonardo Salgado described a new species which they named Rebbachisaurus tessonei (currently moved to the genus Limaysaurus), the specimens of which originate from the same locality (now named as Barda Alarcón) as the vertebra first described by Nopcsa 93 years prior. They therefore claimed that Nopcsa's specimen, at this point already considered lost, was a vertebra of R. tessonei.

In 2007, Argentine paleontologist Sebastián Apesteguía became the first author to recognize that the vertebra described by Nopcsa represents a new genus and species, and thus named this species as Nopcsaspondylus alarconensis. The generic name combines the surname of the first researcher to study it with the Greek word σπονδυλος (spondylus, meaning "vertebra"), while the specific name refers to Barda Alarcón, the locality where the fossil was discovered.

A 2026 reassessment of Nopcsaspondylus concluded it is a nomen dubium since it lacks diagnostic features to distinguish it from other rebbachisaurids.
