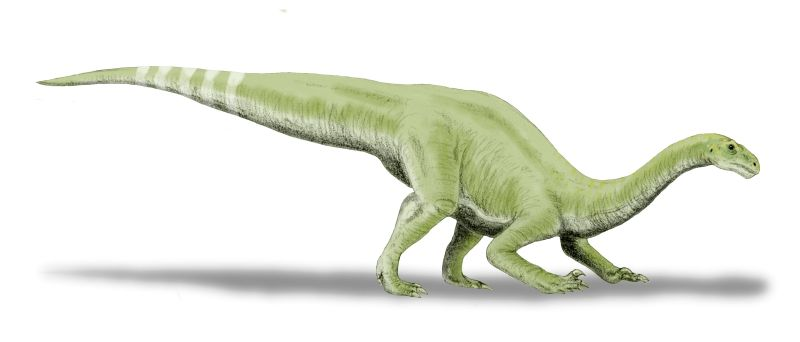
- Speculative life restoration

Scientific classification
- Kingdom: Animalia
- Phylum: Chordata
- Class: Reptilia
- Clade: Dinosauria
- Clade: Saurischia
- Clade: †Sauropodomorpha
- Clade: †Anchisauria
- Genus: †Lamplughsaura; Kutty et al., 2007

Type species
- †Lamplughsaura dharmaramensis Kutty et al., 2007

= Lamplughsaura =

Lamplughsaura Temporal range: Early Jurassic, Hettangian

Extinct genus of dinosaurs

Lamplughsaura is an extinct genus of sauropodomorph dinosaur from the Sinemurian-aged (Early Jurassic) Dharmaram Formation of India. The genus contains a single species, Lamplughsaura dharmaramensis, known from several partial skeletons of a large quadrupedal animal up to 10 metres (33 ft) long. It has been classified as either a basal sauropod or more basal sauropodomorph.

== Discovery and naming ==
The holotype and two referred specimens of Lamplughsaura were discovered by Tharavati S. Kutty in 1972 from rocks of the Pranhita–Godavari Basin that date to the Sinemurian age of Early Jurassic epoch.

Later in 2007, he and his colleagues described the remains as a new genus and species of sauropodomorph, Lamplughsaura dharmaramensis. The generic name honors Pamela Lamplugh Robinson, the founder of the Geological Studies Unit at Indian Statistical Institute, Kolkata. This is combined with "saura", the feminine form of the Greek word "saurus". The specific name references the Dharmaram Formation.

Lamplughsaura was initially described as being either a basal sauropod or a basal sauropodomorph.

== Description ==
Lamplughsaura is said to be a large, heavily built sauropodomorph, with the largest known specimen reaching 10 m (33 ft) in body length. The skull of Lamplughsaura is 27 cm (11 in) long, 15.6 cm (6.1 in) wide at the postorbital region, and 14 cm (5.5 in) high, which is significantly larger than the skulls of Plateosaurus and Riojasaurus.

It can be distinguished from other sauropodomorphs as the teeth possess coarse denticles on the mesial edges in small amounts or are completely absent, the posteiror cervical vertebrae have vertically oriented ligamentous furrows on the cranial and caudal surfaces with the spine table being transversely expanded, the caudal neural spines are shorter than the transverse processes, resulting in the neural spines disappearing towards the tip of the tail, the caudal neural spines have a craniodorsally directed spur (proximal caudal vertebrae) or a distinct process (midcaudal vertebrae), the descending caudal flanges of the distal tibial end cover 66% of the transverse width of the ankle, and the ungual phalanx of the manual digit I is plesiomorphic as it has a general shape that tapers gradually towards the tip and is not received.

=== Ontogeny ===
The cranial elements of Lamplughsaura were discovered in a disarticulated position, which suggests skeletal immaturity, although the neurocentral sutures of the caudal vertebrae are fused, which suggests that the specimens come from subadult individuals.

== Paleoecology ==
Lamplughsaura is known from the Early Jurassic of the Upper Dharmaram Formation, where it likely coexisted with a fellow sauropodomorph, Pradhania gracilis, and was likely preyed upon by an indeterminate Dilophosaurus-like theropod.
