= Sialis mohri =

Scientific classification
- Domain: Eukaryota
- Kingdom: Animalia
- Phylum: Arthropoda
- Class: Insecta
- Order: Megaloptera
- Family: Sialidae
- Genus: Sialis
- Species: S. mohri

Binomial name
- Sialis mohri Ross, 1937

Species of insect

Sialis mohri is a species of alderfly in the family Sialidae. It is found in North America.
