= Upper Dharmaram Formation =

Geologic formation in India

- Stratigraphic range: Hettangian–Sinemurian; ~201.3–190.8 Ma
- Type: Geological formation
- Underlies: Kota Formation
- Overlies: Lower Dharmaram Formation

Lithology
- Primary: Sandstone, mudstone

Location
- Coordinates: 19.3°N 79.5°E
- Approximate paleocoordinates: 28.2°S 34.1°E
- Region: Telangana
- Country: India
- Extent: Pranhita–Godavari Basin
- Upper Dharmaram Formation (India)

The Upper Dharmaram Formation is an Early Jurassic geologic formation found in Telangana, India. Dinosaur remains are among the fossils that have been recovered from the formation.

== Age ==
The Upper Dharmaram Formation overlies the Lower Dharmaram Formation, which dates to the Late Triassic, and conformably underlies the Kota Formation, the age of which is uncertain. Typical Triassic fauna, such as phytosaurs and aetosaurs, are absent from the Upper Dharmaram Formation, suggesting that it is Jurassic in age and that the boundary between the Lower and Upper Dharmaram Formation may correspond to the Triassic-Jurassic boundary. A Sinemurian age has been suggested based on faunal similarities to the Upper Elliot and Clarens Formations of southern Africa, the Kayenta Formation of North America, and the Lower Lufeng Formation of China. A Hettangian age has also been suggested.

== Fossil organisms ==
=== Non-dinosaurian reptiles ===
Crocodylomorphs
Taxon	Location	Stratigraphic position	Material	Notes	Images
aff. Dibothrosuchus			Articulated shoulder gridle, forelimb, and anterior dorsal vertebrae.	A sphenosuchian.	

=== Dinosaurs ===
Theropods
Taxon	Location	Stratigraphic position	Material	Notes	Images
aff. Dilophosaurus			"isolated teeth and limb fragments"	A large neotheropod similar to Dilophosaurus	

Sauropodomorphs
Taxon	Location	Stratigraphic position	Material	Notes	Images
Lamplughsaura dharmaramensis			Partial skeletons of four individuals	Possible basal Sauropod.	Lamplughsaura
Pradhania gracilis			Partial skeleton including a few skull bones, three vertebrae, and partial manus	A non-sauropod sauropodomorph, possibly a massospondylid.	
Sauropodomorpha indet.			Incomplete femur	A probable third sauropodomorph taxon, distinct from both Lamplughsaura and Pradhania	

Ornithischians
Taxon	Location	Stratigraphic position	Material	Notes	Images
Ornithischia indet.			pelvic and sacral material.	An ornithischian of uncertain affinity.	

== See also ==
- List of dinosaur-bearing rock formations
