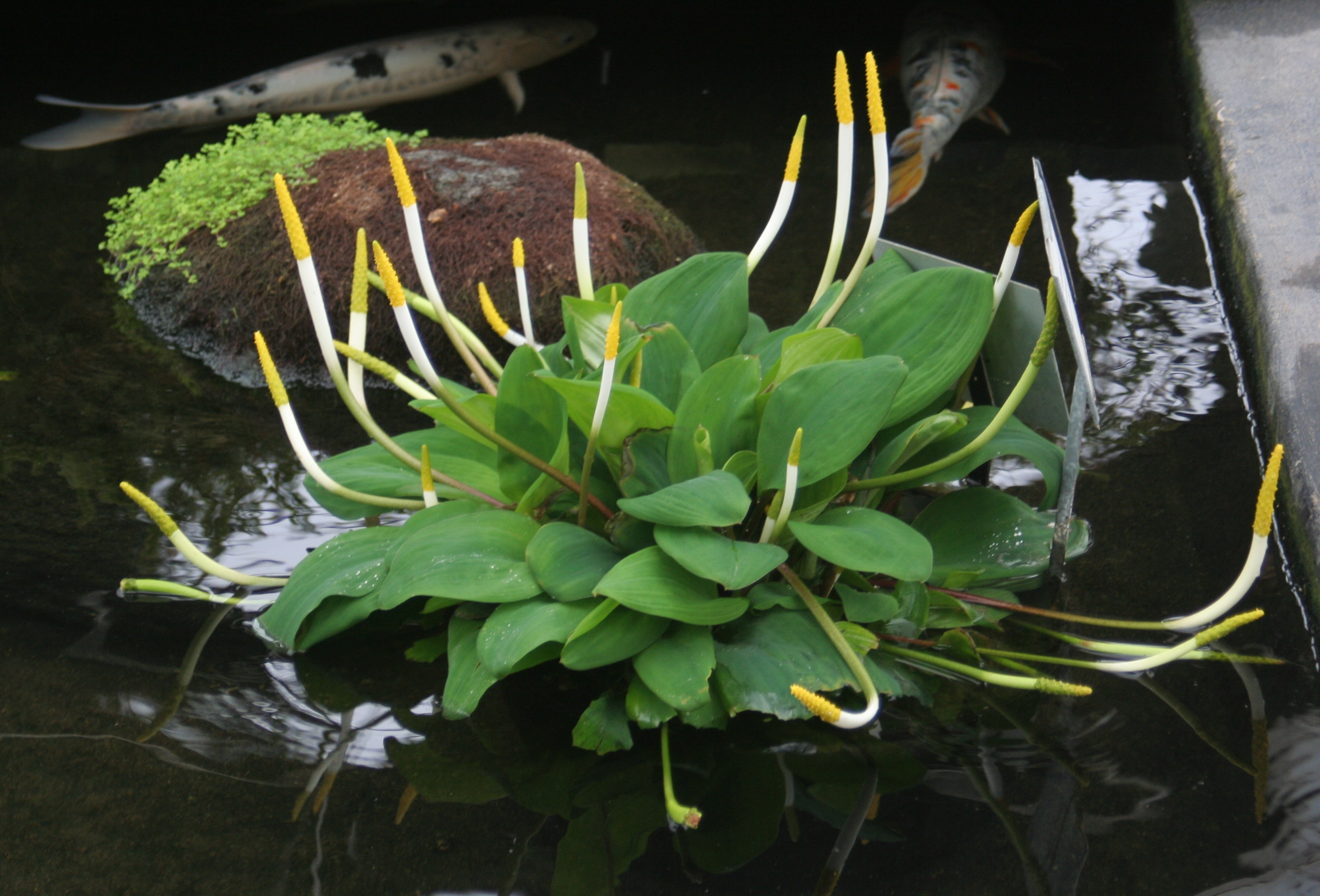

Scientific classification
- Kingdom: Plantae
- Clade: Tracheophytes
- Clade: Angiosperms
- Clade: Monocots
- Order: Alismatales
- Family: Araceae
- Genus: Orontium
- Species: O. aquaticum

Binomial name
- Orontium aquaticum L.

Synonyms
- Amidena undulata Raf.; Aronia aquatica (L.) Baill.; Orontium angustifolium Raf.; Orontium aquaticum f. natans Glück; Orontium aquaticum f. terrestre Glück; Orontium vaginatum Raf.; Pothos ovatus Walter

= Orontium aquaticum =

Species of flowering plant

Orontium aquaticum /ɒˈrɒntiəm/, sometimes called golden-club, floating arum, never-wets or tawkin, is a species of flowering plants in the family Araceae. It is the single living species in the genus Orontium, which also contains several extinct species described from fossils. O. aquaticum is endemic to the eastern United States and is found growing in ponds, streams, and shallow lakes. It prefers an acidic environment. The leaves are pointed and oval with a water repellent surface. The inflorescence is most notable for having an extremely small almost indistinguishable sheath surrounding the spadix. Very early in the flowering this green sheath withers away leaving only the spadix.

The sheath was originally classified by Adolf Engler as a spathe due it being the last foliar piece before the spadix. He also noted that species lacked a sympodial leaf. However, in a 1988 paper Thomas Ray argued that the structure was misidentified by Engler and was actually a sympodial leaf. According to Ray the spathe was missing and not the sympodial leaf. This interpretation was determined based on observations of morphological charactestics namely the appearance of a two-keeled bracteole and its positioning. Despite this, the floral structure is still commonly identified in the literature as being a spathe.

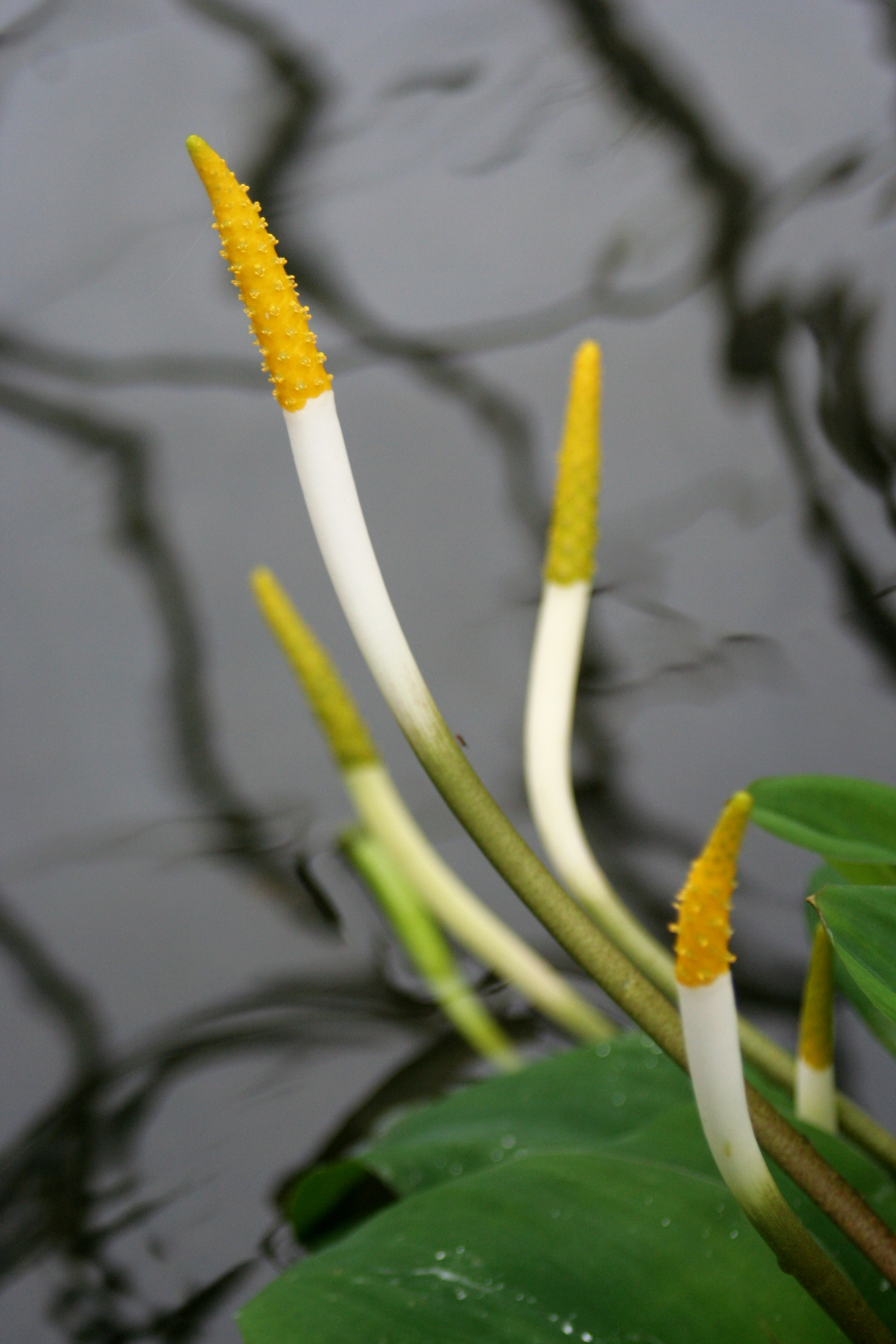

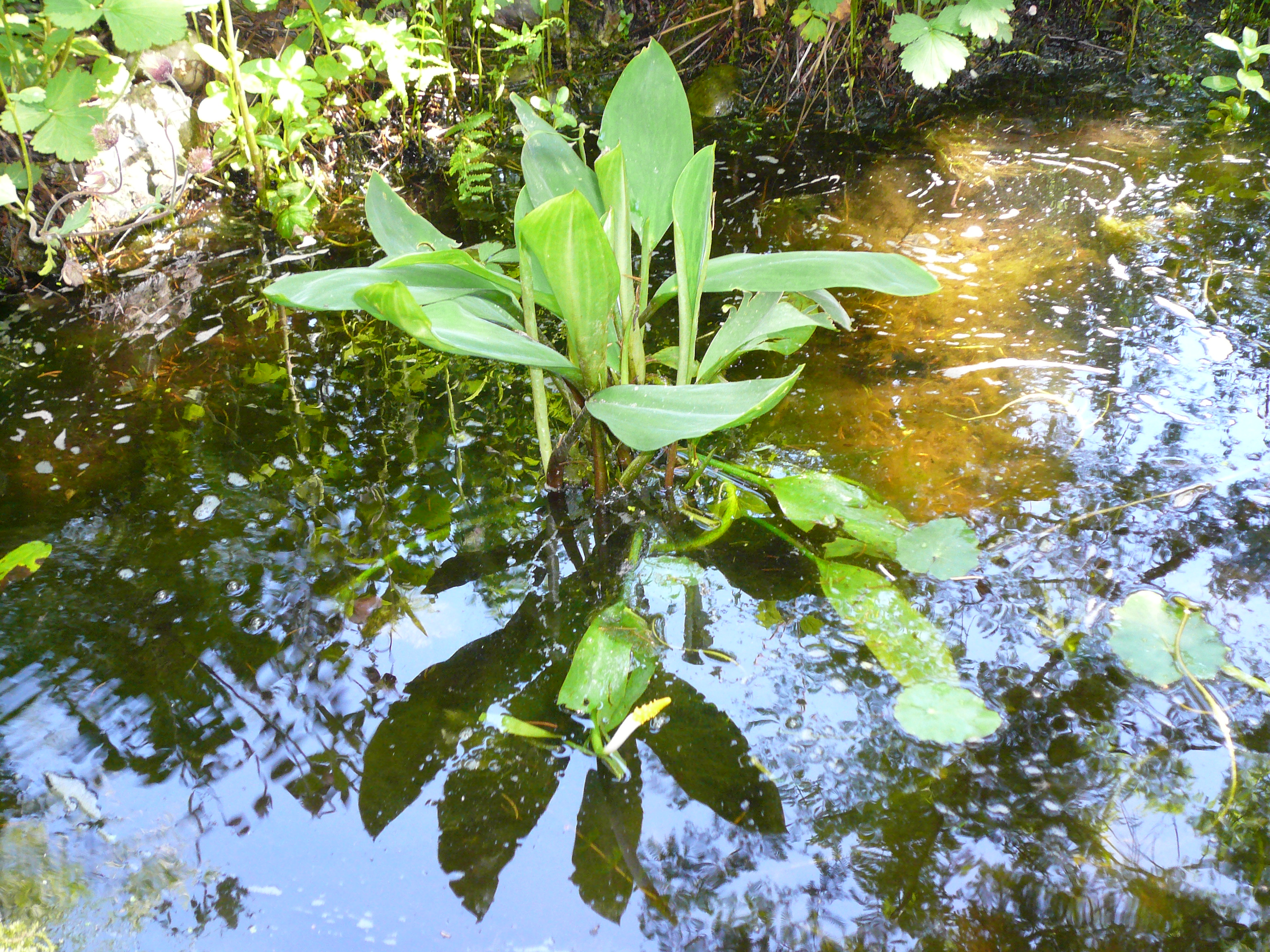

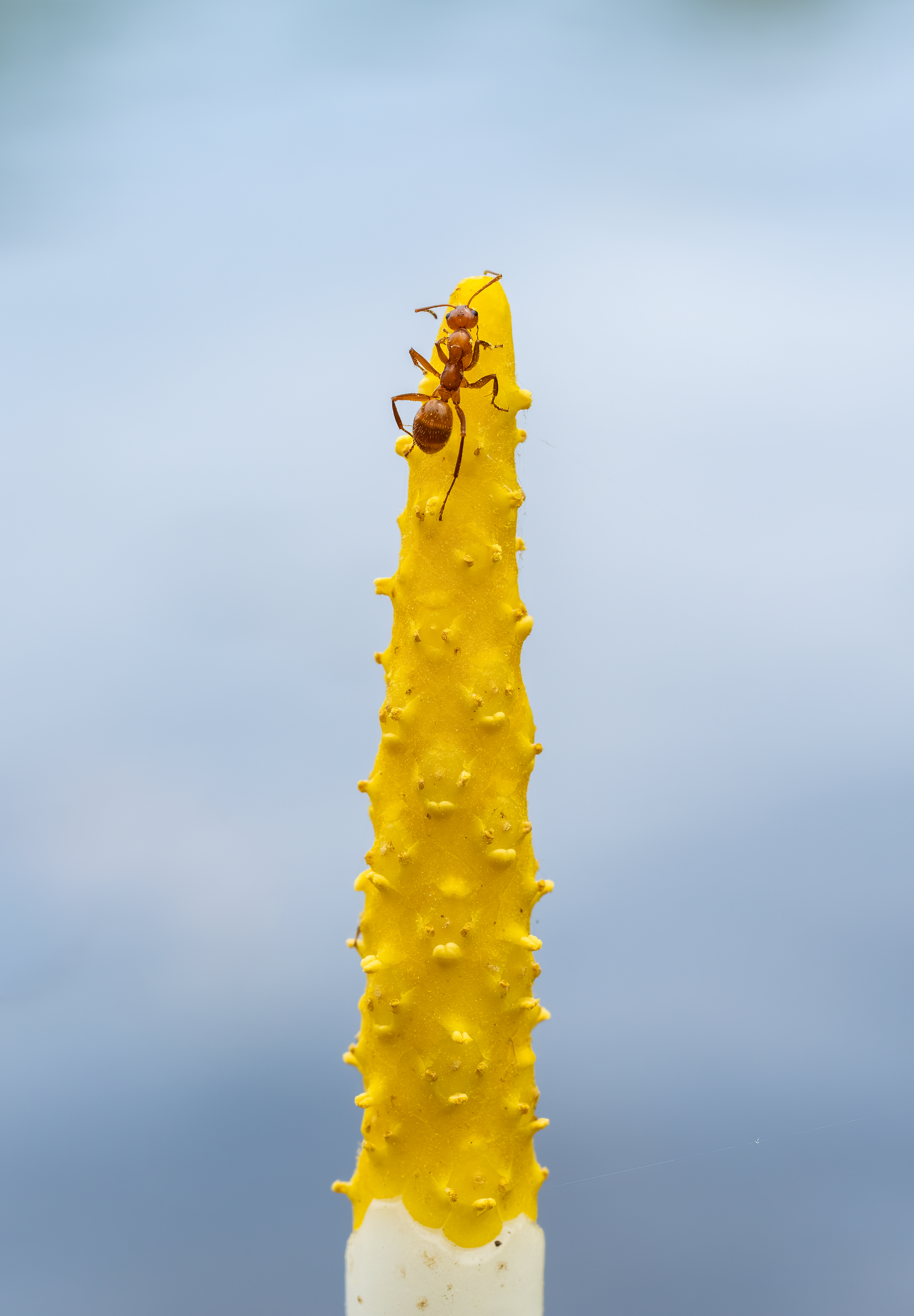
Ant on golden club spadix in New Jersey

== Bibliography ==
- Bown, Deni (2000). Aroids: Plants of the Arum Family [ILLUSTRATED]. Timber Press. ISBN 0-88192-485-7
