= The High Moor, Yongneup of Mt. Daeam =

- Interactive map of The High Moor, Yongneup of Mt. Daeam
- Location: South Korea
- Coordinates: 38°12′56″N 128°07′26″E

Ramsar Wetland
- Official name: The High Moor, Yongneup of Mt. Daeam
- Designated: 28 March 1997
- Reference no.: 898

The High Moor, Yongneup of Mt. Daeam is a bog in Korea. Like the meaning of its name 'dragon swamp of big rocky mountain', the summit of Mt. Daeam (1340 m high above sea level) is formed of giant rocks. Near the peak of the mountain (1280 m above sea level), there is a natural freshwater wetland called Yongneup. Its coastal length is 210 m and its width is 275 m. It is the first Korean wetland to be registered on the list of the Ramsar Convention of Wetlands in 1997.

== Characteristics ==
The name Yongneup signifies that it is a place where dragons rest when they fly up to the sky (Yong means dragon in Korean and neup means wetland). It is the highest moor with peat deposits in South Korea. It is foggy for more than 170 days a year and has a high level of precipitation. The average annual temperature is 12.2 degree Celsius and it has sub-zero temperature for more than 5 months per year. Due to its climate, Yongneup has peat deposits composed of undecomposed plants and this shows how plants have transformed for a few thousand years. On average, peat deposits accumulate at a rate of 0.5–1 mm per year; Yongneup's deepest peat deposit is 1.5 m deep.

== Organisms ==
Animals

- Korean fire-bellied toad (Bombina orientalis)
- Goral (Nemorhaedus goral raddeanus)
- Leopard cat (Prionailurus bengalensis manchurica)
- Marten (Martes flavigula koreana)
- Flying squirrel (Pteromys volans)
- Wild boar (Sus scrofa creanus)
- Korean hare (Lepus sinensis coreanus)
- Western roe deer (Capreolus capreolus)
- Chinese water deer (Hydropotes inermis)

Plants

- Marsh-trefoil (Menyanthes trifoliata)
- Chickweed wintergreen (Trientalis europaea)
- Prairie sphagnum (Sphagnum palustre)
- Common rush (Juncus effusus)
- Flatleaf bladderwort (Utricularia intermedia)
