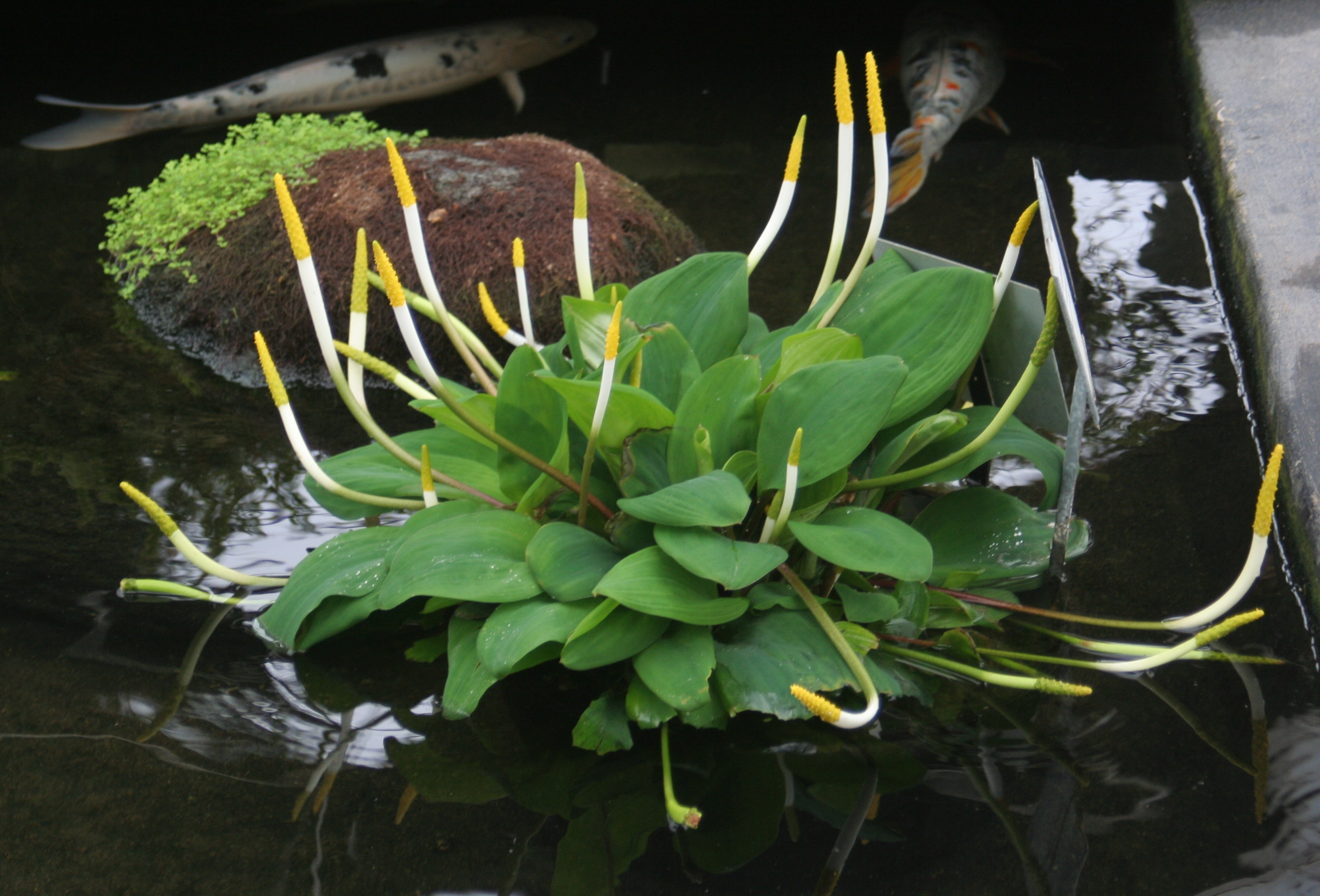

Scientific classification
- Kingdom: Plantae
- Clade: Tracheophytes
- Clade: Angiosperms
- Clade: Monocots
- Order: Alismatales
- Family: Araceae
- Subfamily: Orontioideae
- Genus: Orontium; L.

Species
- Orontium aquaticum; †Orontium mackii; †Orontium wolfei

Synonyms
- Amidena Adans.; Aronia Mitch.

= Orontium =

Orontium Temporal range: Late Cretaceous - Recent

Genus of flowering plants

Orontium /ɒˈrɒntiəm/, sometimes called golden-club, is a genus of flowering plants in the family Araceae. The single living species in the genus is Orontium aquaticum, while the two other described species, Orontium mackii and Orontium wolfei, are known from fossils.

Orontium mackii is the geologically oldest species described, with fossils of the species being found in the Jose Creek member of the McRae Formation in New Mexico. The formation is dated to the Late Cretaceous, possibly the Maastrichtian. The species is noted for having a simpler vein structure in the leaves then is seen in either O. wolfei or O. aquaticum. Two of the outcrops where the species was found are preserved volcanic ash beds which hosted long-term standing water. However, a third outcrop is that of a well-drained floodplain with no evidence of standing water. This indicates the possibility that O. mackii was not an obligate hydrophyte. The second fossil species O. wolfei is from Early to early Middle Eocene rocks in northern Washington state and southern central British Columbia. In contrast to the subtropical environment which O. mackii lived in, O. wolfei inhabited a colder upland environment with temperatures similar to that seen in the northern end of the O. aquaticum range. O. wolfei appears to have inhabited swampy areas and marginal regions of upland lakes in the region. The leaves of O. wolfei show a more complex vein structure than seen in O. mackii and have a hooded leaf tip similar to O. aquaticum.

The living O. aquaticum is endemic to eastern North America and is found growing in ponds, streams, and shallow lakes. It prefers an acidic environment. The leaves are pointed and oval with a water repellent surface. The inflorescence is most notable for having an extremely small almost indistinguishable sheath surrounding the spadix. Very early in the flowering this green sheath withers away leaving only the spadix. The flowering occurs in the spring. Native Americans once ate the seeds and rhizome by drying them out and grinding them into a starchy substance.

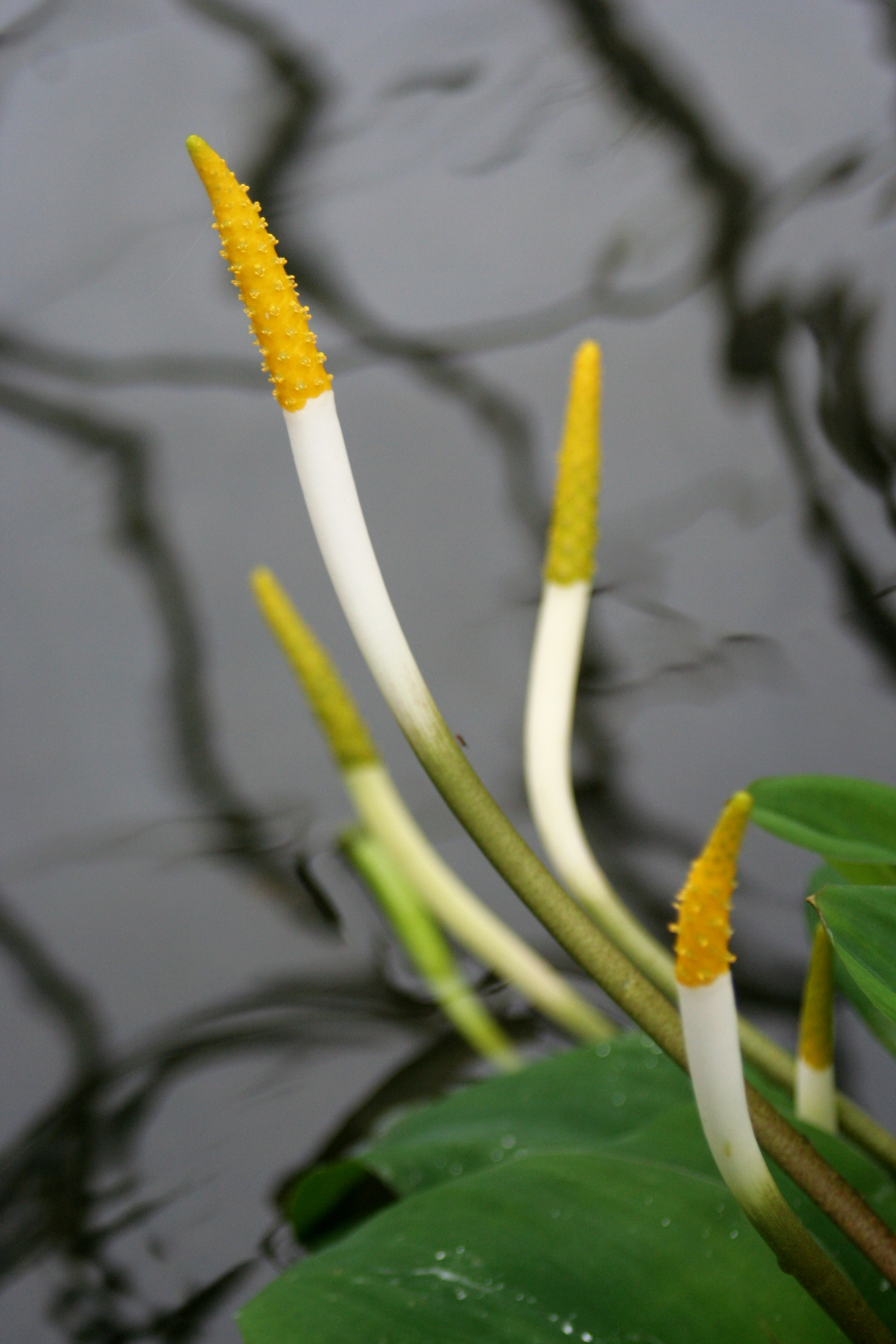
O. aquaticum

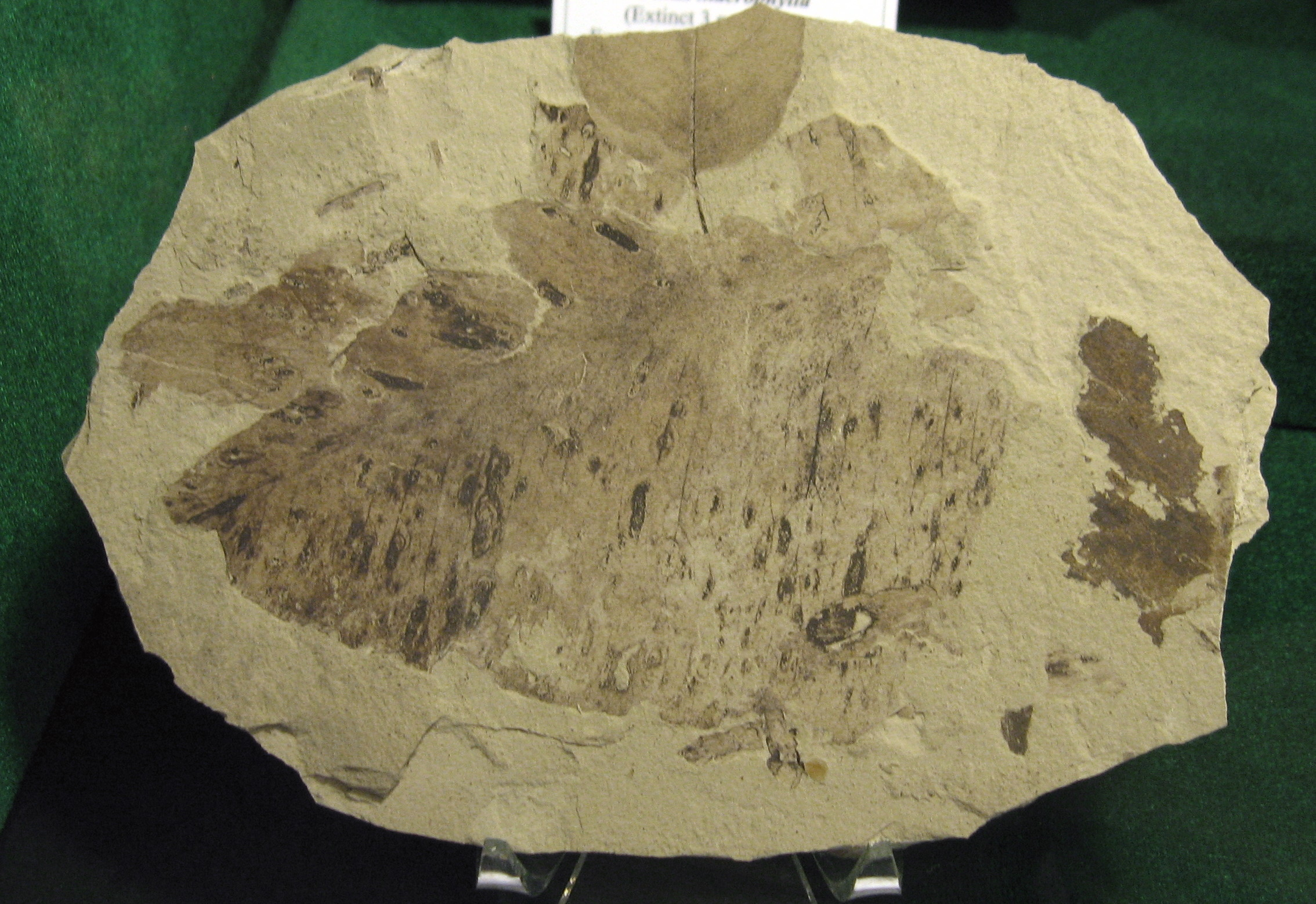
O. wolfei

== Bibliography ==
- Bown, Deni (2000). Aroids: Plants of the Arum Family [ILLUSTRATED]. Timber Press. ISBN 0-88192-485-7
