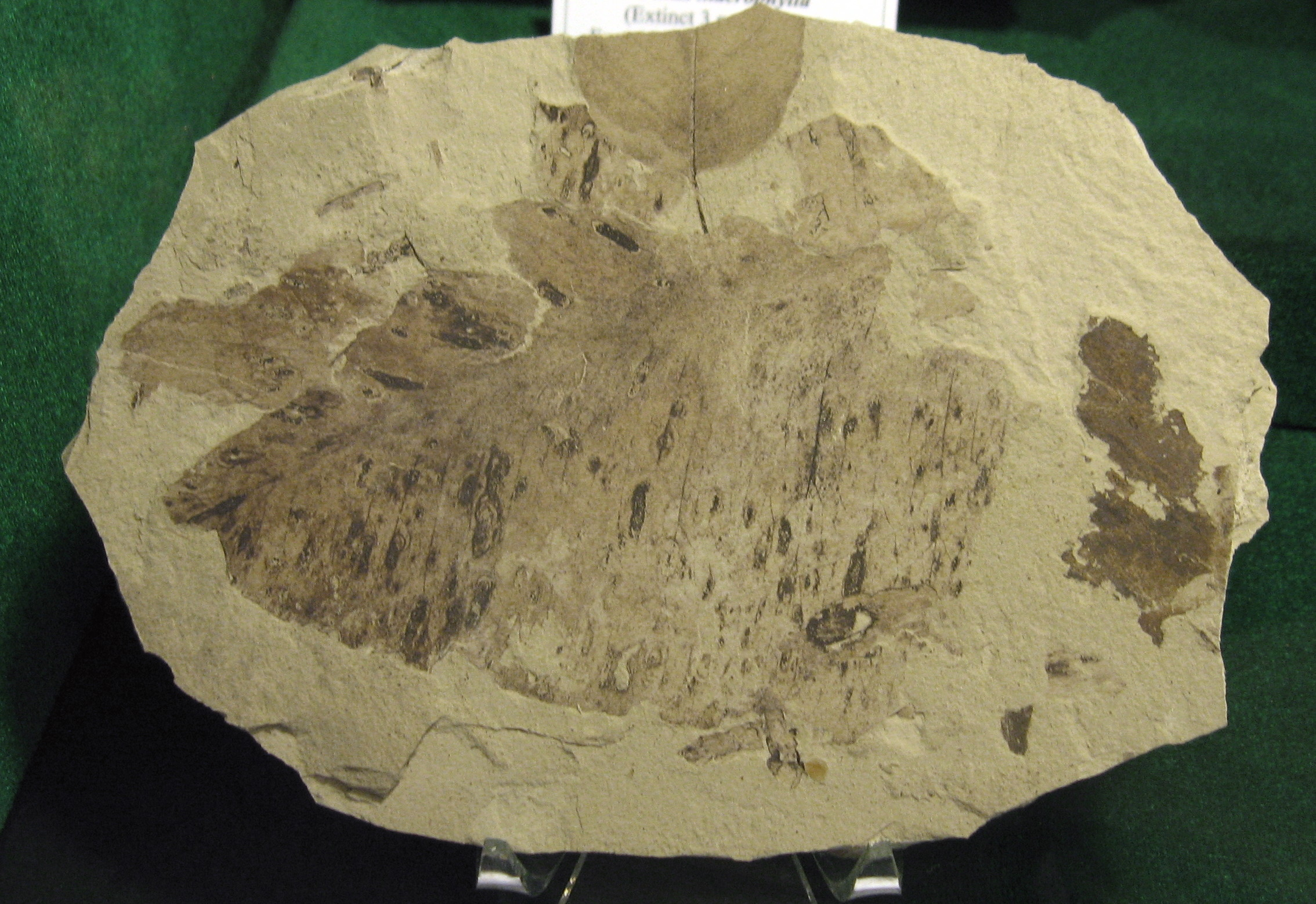
- Fossil Orontium wolfei

Scientific classification
- Kingdom: Plantae
- Clade: Tracheophytes
- Clade: Angiosperms
- Clade: Monocots
- Order: Alismatales
- Family: Araceae
- Genus: Orontium
- Species: †O. wolfei

Binomial name
- †Orontium wolfei Bogner, Johnson, Kvaček & Upchurch

= Orontium wolfei =

Orontium wolfei Temporal range: Early - Middle Eocene

Extinct species of flowering plant

Orontium wolfei is an extinct golden-club species in the family Araceae described from a series of isolated fossil leaves. The species is known from Eocene sediments exposed in the state of Washington in the United States of America and the province of British Columbia in Canada. It is one of several extinct species placed in the living golden-club genus Orontium.

== History and classification ==
Orontium wolfei has been identified from a group of exposures of the Allenby Formation and a group of exposures of the related Klondike Mountain Formation. The type locality is at the "One mile Creek" exposure of the Allenby Formation near Princeton, British Columbia and additional fossils have been recovered from the Lamont Creek site near Princeton. The Allenby Formation is currently considered to be Early Eocene in age, based on Potassium–argon radiometric dating of plagioclase and biotite crystals. The second group of fossils have been recovered from three outcrops of the early to early Middle Eocene Klondike Mountain Formation around Republic, Washington. Fossils in the Klondike Mountain Formation are found in mudstone and shale layers of the lower part of the formation. The lakes which produced these fossils are estimated to have been active between 48 and 49 million years ago, with the lava flows in the formation dating between 42 and 50 million years old. Fossils of O. wolfei found in the Klondike Mountain Formation have been noted, prior to the species description, as belonging to the extinct morphogenus Zingiberopsis in collections and publications. Zingiberopsis is a form taxon for Upper Cretaceous to Oligocene fossil leaves found in Western North America which are related to the modern Zingiberales, a plant order which includes modern bananas and gingers. This identification was made by Jack A. Wolfe for specimens in the paleobotanical collection of the Burke Museum, Seattle, Washington.

The species was described from a type specimen, the holotype specimen DMNH-26516 which is currently preserved in the paleobotanical collections housed at the Denver Museum of Nature and Science, in Denver, Colorado. The specimens were studied by a group of paleobotanists led by Josef Bogner, with the team publishing their 2007 type description for O. wolfei in the Journal Zitteliana. The etymology of the chosen specific name wolfei is in recognition of paleobotanist Jack Wolfe for his work on the Western North American Paleogene.

== Description ==
The leaves of O. wolfei are an elongated elliptical shape overall, being between 170 millimetres (6.7 in) and over 450 millimetres (18 in) long. The leaves range from 50–150 millimetres (2.0–5.9 in) in width, with the full length of large leaves and the structure of the leaf petiole unknown as complete specimens have not been found. The leaf tips are hooded in shape and the veins are a sub-parallel showing a very indistinct midrib. The primary veins and major secondary veins start near the leaf base and are connected by a dense tertiary and higher order veins forming a mesh of elongated aerolae. The pattern of the veins is characteristic of the family Araceae and confirms this species' placement in it.
