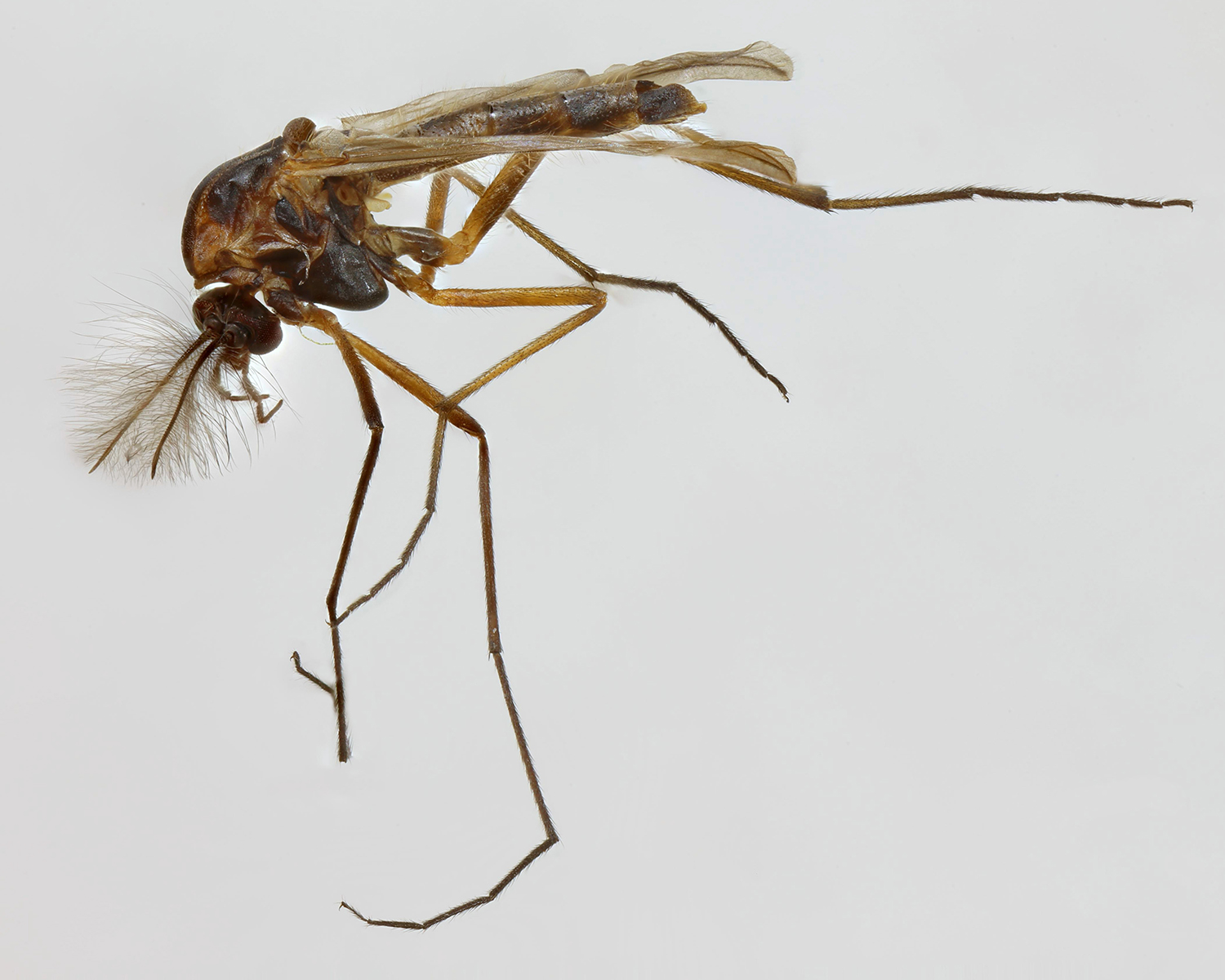
- Prodiamesa olivacea North Wales

Scientific classification
- Kingdom: Animalia
- Phylum: Arthropoda
- Class: Insecta
- Order: Diptera
- Family: Chironomidae
- Genus: Prodiamesa
- Species: P. olivacea

Binomial name
- Prodiamesa olivacea (Meigen, 1818)

= Prodiamesa olivacea =

Species of fly

Prodiamesa olivacea is a species of fly in the family Chironomidae. It is found in the Palearctic.
