= Anthony J. Martin =

American paleontologist

Anthony J. Martin is a paleontologist who has taught at Emory University since the early 1990s. He is best known for his books, An Introduction to the Study of Dinosaurs, Life Traces of the Georgia Coast, Dinosaurs without Bones, and Life Sculpted: Tales of the Animals, Plants, and Fungi that Drill, Break, and Scrape to Shape Earth. He is married to artist Ruth Schowalter.

Martin's main area of expertise is ichnology, the study of animal activity in modern and ancient sediments. He studied dwarf fossil faunas under Wayne A. Pryor at Miami University and Ordovician trace fossils under Robert W. Frey at the University of Georgia. Both Pryor and Frey emphasized the need for ichnologists to study modern traces in order to understand trace fossils, and Martin took this to heart. He honed his tracking skills in several field schools with emphasis on modern vertebrate ichnology. Having run numerous field trips and field courses on Sapelo Island, Georgia and San Salvador Island together with Emory colleague Stephen W. Henderson, Martin developed the experience necessary for books on Trace Fossils of San Salvador and Life Traces of the Georgia Coast.

Martin has visited Australia several times to lecture at Monash University and to collaborate with researchers there on the ichnology of polar dinosaurs and the oldest known fossils of crayfish. In the United States, he was part of the team that discovered the first known dinosaur burrow. He has also written several times on the ichnology of modern and fossil arthropods, including the modern ghost crab Ocypode quadrata and the Paleozoic trace fossils Arthrophycus and Nereites. Martin is a proactive educator who uses the Web for education well beyond his Emory venue, notably by blogging, e.g., as the PaleoPoet and currently as author of "Life Traces of the Georgia Coast: Unseen Lives of the Georgia Barrier Islands".

== Select publications ==
- Hasiotis, S.T.; Wellner, R.W.; Martin, A.J.; Demko, T.M. (2004). "Vertebrate Burrows from Triassic and Jurassic Continental Deposits of North America and Antarctica: Their Paleoenvironmental and Paleoecological Significance" (PDF). Ichnos. 11 (1–2): 103–124. Bibcode:2004Ichno..11..103H. doi:10.1080/10420940490428760. ISSN 1042-0940. S2CID 7106045. Archived from the original (PDF) on 2016-02-22.
- Varricchio, D.J.; Martin, A.J.; Katsura, Y. (2007). "First trace and body fossil evidence of a burrowing, denning dinosaur". Proceedings of the Royal Society B: Biological Sciences. 274 (1616): 1361–1368. doi:10.1098/rspb.2006.0443. PMC 2176205. PMID 17374596.
- Martin, A.J.; Vickers-Rich, P.; Rich, T.H.; Kool, L. (2007). "Polar dinosaur tracks in the Cretaceous of Australia: though many were cold, few were frozen". Journal of Vertebrate Paleontology. 27 (Suppl 3). doi:10.1080/02724634.2007.10010458.
- Martin, A.J. (2013). Life Traces of the Georgia Coast: Revealing the Unseen Lives of Plants and Animals. Indiana University Press. pp. 1–692. ISBN 9780253006028.
- Martin, A.J. (2014). Dinosaurs Without Bones: Dinosaur Lives Revealed by Their Trace Fossils. Pegasus Books. pp. 1–460. ISBN 978-1-60598-499-5.
- Martin, A.J. (2017). The Evolution Underground: Burrows, Bunkers, and the Marvelous Subterranean World Beneath our Feet. Pegasus Books. pp. 1–400. ISBN 9781681773124.
