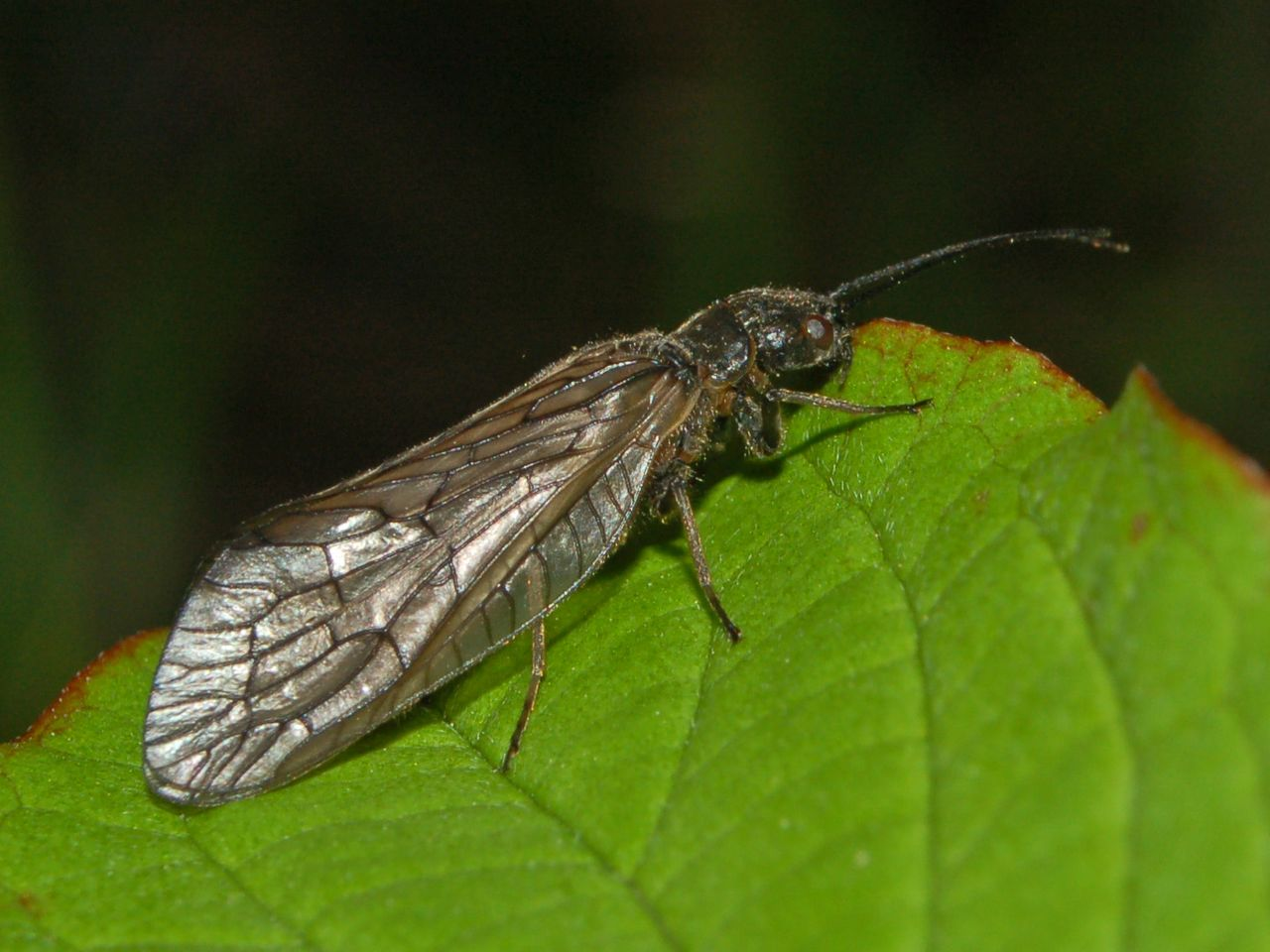
- Sialis lutaria

Scientific classification
- Kingdom: Animalia
- Phylum: Arthropoda
- Clade: Pancrustacea
- Class: Insecta
- Order: Megaloptera
- Family: Sialidae
- Subfamily: Sialinae
- Genus: Sialis; Latreille, 1803

Species
- See text

= Sialis =

Genus of insects

Sialis is a genus of alderfly belonging to the order Megaloptera family Sialidae.

== Description ==
These alderflies are small and mainly brown with a relatively heavy body and forewings reaching a length of 10 to 20 millimeters. Females are usually larger than males. They have wings with large cells forming a network. The upper edge of the front wings consists of almost square cells. The species belonging to the genus Sialis have less than fifteen square cells, while the other Megaloptera have more cells. The adults are diurnal and fly from May to June on the riparian vegetation.

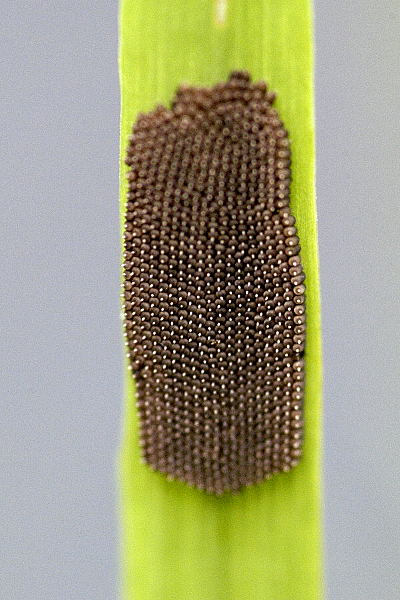
Eggs of Sialis fuliginosa

Females lay on the leaves of the shore plants up to 2000 eggs in groups of about 200. The resulting hatching larvae fall directly into the water. They live in the water at first, and later buried in the mud, up to 18 meters of depth. These larvae feed on larvae of insects, worms and small molluscs. They usually need two years to develop, overwintering as larvae. Pupation takes place on the shore under the soil.

== Distribution ==
Species of this genus are present in most of Europe.

== List of species ==
This is a complete list of Sialis species as of 2026.

- Sialis abchasica Vshivkova, 1985
- Sialis aequalis Banks, 1920
- Sialis americana (Rambur, 1842)
- Sialis annae Vshivkova, 1979
- Sialis arvalis Ross, 1937
- Sialis atra Navás, (1928)
- Sialis bifida Hayashi & Suda, 1997
- Sialis bilineata Say, 1823
- Sialis bilobata Whiting, 1991
- Sialis californica Banks, 1920
- Sialis chilensis McLachlan, (1871)
- Sialis concava Banks, 1897
- Sialis contigua Flint, 1964
- Sialis cornuta Ross, 1937
- Sialis didyma Navás, 1916
- Sialis dorochovae Vshivkova, 1985
- Sialis dorsata Say, 1823
- Sialis dreisbachi Flint, 1964
- Sialis elegans Liu & D. Yang, 2006
- Sialis flavicollis Enderlein, 1910
- Sialis formosana Esben-Petersen, 1913
- Sialis frequens Okamoto, 1905
- Sialis fuliginosa F. Pictet, 1836
- Sialis fumosa Navás, 1915
- Sialis glabella Ross, 1937
- Sialis gonzalezi Vshivkova, 1985
- †Sialis groehni Wichard, 1997
- Sialis hamata Ross, 1937
- Sialis hasta Ross, 1937
- Sialis henanensis Liu & D. Yang, 2006
- Sialis imbecilla Say, 1823
- Sialis immarginata Say, 1823
- Sialis infumata Newman, 1838
- Sialis iola Ross, 1937
- Sialis itasca Ross, 1937
- Sialis japonica van der Weele, 1909
- Sialis jianfengensis D. Yang et al., 2002
- Sialis joppa Ross, 1937
- Sialis klingstedti Vshivkova, 1985
- Sialis kouwenkaii Tu et al., 2023
- Sialis kunmingensis Liu & D. Yang, 2006
- Sialis levanidovae Vshivkova, 1980
- Sialis longidens Klingstedt, (1932)
- Sialis lutaria (Linnaeus, 1758)
- Sialis martynovae Vshivkova, 1980
- Sialis melania Nakahara, 1915
  - Sialis melania ssp. kyushuensis Hayashi & Suda, 1995
  - Sialis melania ssp. melania Nakahara, 1915
  - Sialis melania ssp. tohokuensis Hayashi & Suda, 1995
  - Sialis melania ssp. toyamaensis Hayashi & Suda, 1995
- Sialis mohri Ross, 1937
- Sialis morio Klingstedt, (1933)
- Sialis morrisoni K. Davis, 1903
- Sialis muratensis Nel, 1988
- Sialis nevadensis K. Davis, 1903
- Sialis nigripes E. Pictet, 1865
- Sialis nina Townsend, 1939
- Sialis occidens Ross, 1937
- Sialis rotunda Banks, 1920
- Sialis sibirica McLachlan, 1872
- Sialis sinensis Banks, (1940)
- Sialis sordida Klingstedt, (1933)
- Sialis spangleri Flint, 1964
- Sialis strausi Illies, 1967
- Sialis vagans Ross, 1937
- Sialis vanderweelei Aspöck & Aspöck, 1983
- Sialis velata Ross, 1937
- Sialis versicoloris Liu & D. Yang, 2006
- Sialis yamatoensis Hayashi & Suda, 1995
- Sialis zhiltzovae Vshivkova, 1985
