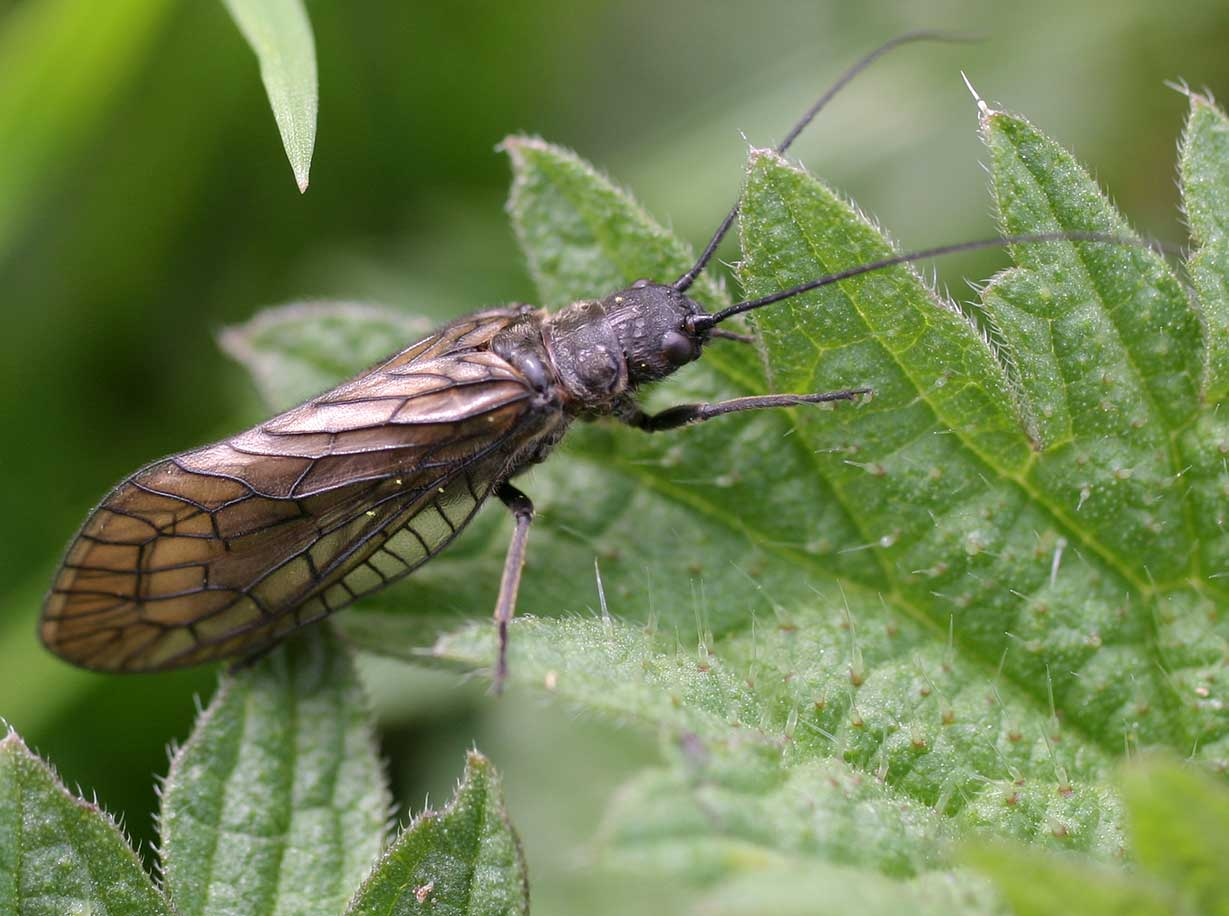
- Adult Sialis lutaria

Scientific classification
- Kingdom: Animalia
- Phylum: Arthropoda
- Clade: Pancrustacea
- Class: Insecta
- Order: Megaloptera
- Family: Sialidae; Leach, 1815

Subfamilies
- See text

= Alderfly =

Alderfly Temporal range: Toarcian–Recent

Family of insects

Alderflies are megalopteran insects of the family Sialidae. They are closely related to the dobsonflies and fishflies as well as to the prehistoric Euchauliodidae. All living alderflies – about 66 species all together – are part of the subfamily Sialinae, which contains nine extant genera.Sialis lutaria is the commonest alderfly in the United Kingdom and across much of Europe.

== Description ==
Sialinae have a body length of less than 25 mm (1 inch), long filamentous antennae, and four large dark wings of which the anterior pair is slightly longer than the posterior. They lack ocelli and their fourth tarsal segment is dilated and deeply bilobed. Dead alderfly larvae are used as bait in fishing.

== Life cycle ==
The females lay a vast number of eggs on grass stems near water. When the larvae are born they drop into the water or the ground nearby it and make their way into their new aquatic biome. The larvae are aquatic, active, armed with strong sharp mandibles, and breathe by means of seven pairs of abdominal branchial filaments. When full sized, which takes between one and two years, they leave the water and spend a quiescent pupal stage on the land before metamorphosis into the sexually mature insect. Adult alderflies stay near to the water in which they had lived when they were younger. Once in their adult stage, they tend to live only 2 to 3 weeks, which they spend mainly in reproducing.

== Classification ==
In addition to the nine living genera, there are several genera of fossil alderflies.

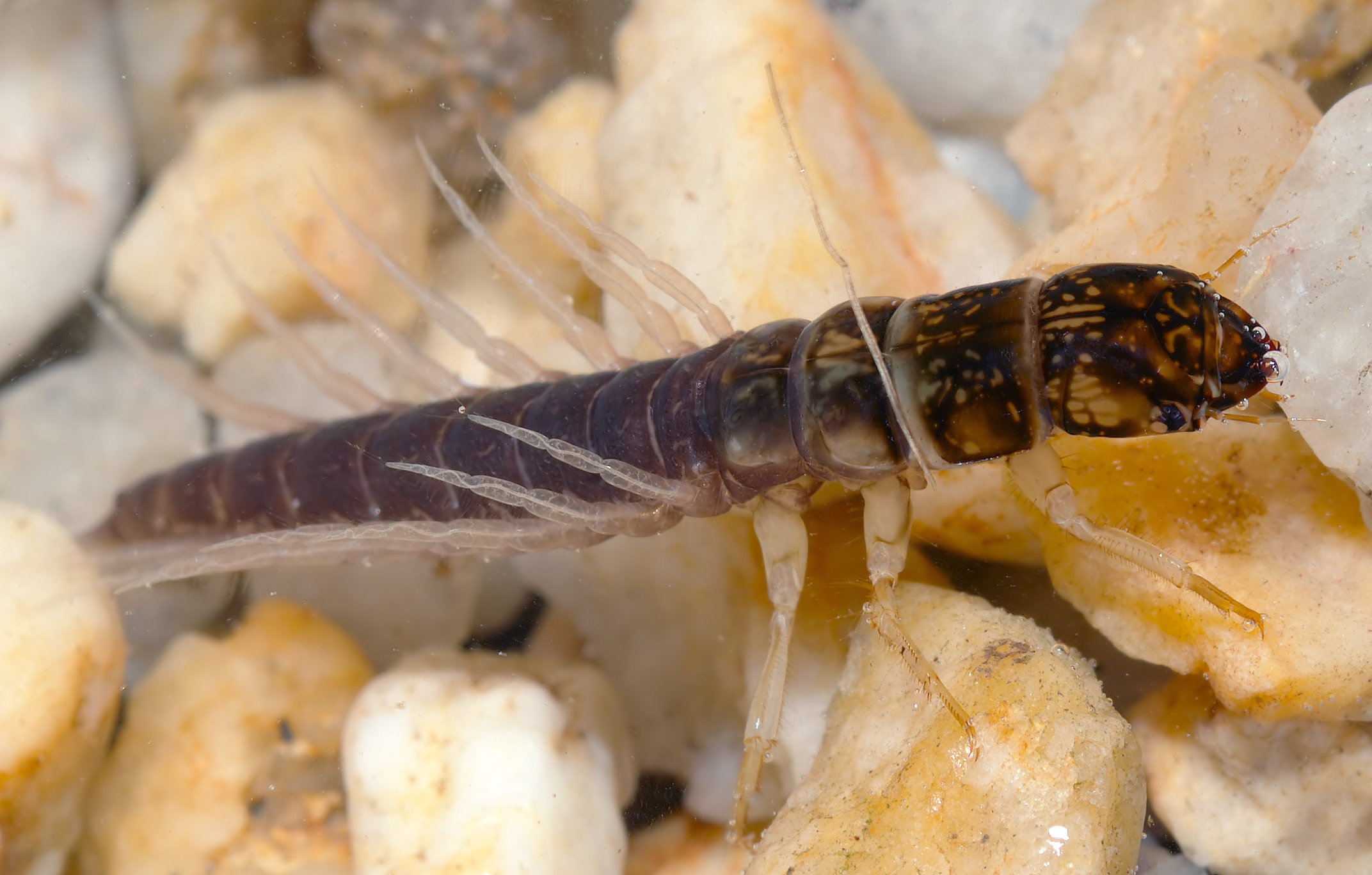
Sialis lutaria larva

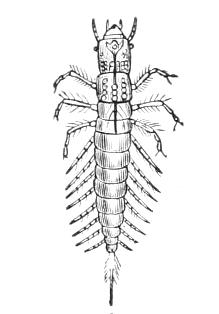
Larva

Family Sialidae

- Subfamily †Sharasialinae Liu, Hayashi & D.Yang, 2015
  - Genus †Sharasialis Ponomarenko, 2012 Shar-Teeg, Mongolia, Late Jurassic (Tithonian)
- Subfamily Sialinae Leach in Brewster, 1815
  - Genus Austrosialis Tillyard, [1919]
    - Species Austrosialis ignicollis Tillyard, [1919]
    - Species Austrosialis maxmouldsi Theischinger, 1983
  - Genus Caribesialis Ardila-Camacho et al., 2021
    - Species Caribesialis bifasciata (Hagen, 1861)
  - Genus †Dobbertinia Handlirsch 1920 Green Series, Germany, Early Jurassic (Toarcian)
    - Species †Dobbertinia reticulata Handlirsch in Schröder, 1920
  - Genus †Eosialis Nel et al., 2002
    - Species †Eosialis dorisi Nel et al., 2002
  - Genus Haplosialis Navás, 1927
    - Species Haplosialis madegassa Navás, 1927
    - Species Haplosialis afra Navás, (1936)
  - Genus †Haplosialodes Huang et al., 2016
    - Species †Haplosialodes liui Huang et al., 2016
  - Genus Ilyobius Enderlein, 1910
    - Species †Ilyobius balticus (Wichard, 1997)
    - Species Ilyobius bimaculata Banks, 1920
    - Species †Ilyobius cascus (Engel & Grimaldi, 2007)
    - Species Ilyobius chilensis (McLachlan, (1871)
    - Species Ilyobius curvatus Liu et al., 2015
    - Species Ilyobius erebus Mendes et al., 2022
    - Species Ilyobius flammatus Penny, (1981)
    - Species Ilyobius flavicollis (Enderlein, 1910)
    - Species Ilyobius hauseri Contreras-Ramos et al., (2005)
    - Species †Ilyobius herrlingi Wichard, 2002
    - Species Ilyobius mexicana (Banks, 1901)
    - Species Ilyobius nigrocephalus Ardila-Camacho et al., 2021
    - Species Ilyobius nubila Navás, 1933
    - Species Ilyobius ranchograndis Contreras-Ramos, 2006
  - Genus Indosialis Lestage, 1927
    - Species Indosialis bannaensis Liu et al., 2006
    - Species Indosialis beskonakensis Nel, 1988
    - Species Indosialis indica Liu et al., 2008
    - Species Indosialis minora (Banks, 1920)
  - Genus Leptosialis Esben-Petersen, 1920
    - Species Leptosialis africana Esben-Petersen, 1920
  - Genus †Proindosialis Nel, 1988
    - Species †Proindosialis cantalensis Nel, 1988
  - Genus Protosialis van der Weele, 1909
    - Species Protosialis americana (Rambur, 1842)
    - Species Protosialis australiensis (Tillyard, [1919)
    - Species Protosialis australis Navás, 1927
    - Species Protosialis brasiliensis Navás, 1936
    - Species Protosialis minora Banks, 1920
    - Species †Protosialis voigti (Wichard & Engel, 2006)
  - Genus Sialis Latreille, 1802 (approx. 90 species)
    - Species Sialis abchasica Vshivkova, 1985
    - Species Sialis aequalis Banks, 1920
    - Species Sialis americana (Rambur, 1842)
    - Species Sialis annae Vshivkova, 1979
    - Species Sialis arvalis Ross, 1937
    - Species Sialis atra Navás, (1928)
    - Species Sialis bifida Hayashi & Suda, 1997
    - Species Sialis bilineata Say, 1823
    - Species Sialis bilobata Whiting, 1991
    - Species Sialis californica Banks, 1920
    - Species Sialis chilensis McLachlan, (1871)
    - Species Sialis concava Banks, 1897
    - Species Sialis contigua Flint, 1964
    - Species Sialis cornuta Ross, 1937
    - Species Sialis didyma Navás, 1916
    - Species Sialis dorochovae Vshivkova, 1985
    - Species Sialis dorsata Say, 1823
    - Species Sialis dreisbachi Flint, 1964
    - Species Sialis elegans Liu & D. Yang, 2006
    - Species Sialis flavicollis Enderlein, 1910
    - Species Sialis formosana Esben-Petersen, 1913
    - Species Sialis frequens Okamoto, 1905
    - Species Sialis fuliginosa F. Pictet, 1836
    - Species Sialis fumosa Navás, 1915
    - Species Sialis glabella Ross, 1937
    - Species Sialis gonzalezi Vshivkova, 1985
    - Species †Sialis groehni Wichard, 1997
    - Species Sialis hamata Ross, 1937
    - Species Sialis hasta Ross, 1937
    - Species Sialis henanensis Liu & D. Yang, 2006
    - Species Sialis imbecilla Say, 1823
    - Species Sialis immarginata Say, 1823
    - Species Sialis infumata Newman, 1838
    - Species Sialis iola Ross, 1937
    - Species Sialis itasca Ross, 1937
    - Species Sialis japonica van der Weele, 1909
    - Species Sialis jianfengensis D. Yang et al., 2002
    - Species Sialis joppa Ross, 1937
    - Species Sialis klingstedti Vshivkova, 1985
    - Species Sialis kunmingensis Liu & D. Yang, 2006
    - Species Sialis kouwenkaii Tu et al., 2023
    - Species Sialis levanidovae Vshivkova, 1980
    - Species Sialis longidens Klingstedt, (1932)
    - Species Sialis lutaria (Linnaeus, 1758)
    - Species Sialis martynovae Vshivkova, 1980
    - Species Sialis melania Nakahara, 1915
      - Subspecies Sialis melania kyushuensis Hayashi & Suda, 1995
      - Subspecies Sialis melania melania Nakahara, 1915
      - Subspecies Sialis melania tohokuensis Hayashi & Suda, 1995
      - Subspecies Sialis melania toyamaensis Hayashi & Suda, 1995
    - Species Sialis mohri Ross, 1937
    - Species Sialis morio Klingstedt, (1933)
    - Species Sialis morrisoni K. Davis, 1903
    - Species Sialis muratensis Nel, 1988
    - Species Sialis nevadensis K. Davis, 1903
    - Species Sialis nigripes E. Pictet, 1865
    - Species Sialis nina Townsend, 1939
    - Species Sialis occidens Ross, 1937
    - Species Sialis rotunda Banks, 1920
    - Species Sialis sibirica McLachlan, 1872
    - Species Sialis sinensis Banks, (1940)
    - Species Sialis sordida Klingstedt, (1933)
    - Species Sialis spangleri Flint, 1964
    - Species Sialis strausi Illies, 1967
    - Species Sialis vagans Ross, 1937
    - Species Sialis vanderweelei Aspöck & Aspöck, 1983
    - Species Sialis velata Ross, 1937
    - Species Sialis versicoloris Liu & D. Yang, 2006
    - Species Sialis yamatoensis Hayashi & Suda, 1995
    - Species Sialis zhiltzovae Vshivkova, 1985
  - Genus Stenosialis Tillyard, (1919)
    - Species Stenosialis australiensis Tillyard, (1919)
    - Species Stenosialis hollowayi Theischinger, 1983
- Subfamily Incertae sedis
  - Genus †Chauliosialis Ponomarenko, 1976
    - Species †Chauliosialis sukatshevae Ponomarenko, 1976
  - Genus †Nematophlebia Cockerell, 1915
    - Species †Nematophlebia plicata Cockerell, 1915

=== Phylogeny ===
Phylogeny based on Liu et al., 2015 and Ardila-Camacho et al., 2021:

- Sialidae
  - †Sharashianae
    †Sharasialis
  - †Dobbertinia (putative position)
  - Sialinae
    - Austrosialis
    - - Stenosialis lineage
        - Stenosialis
        - Leptosialis
      - - - Ilyobius lineage
            - - Haplosialis
              - - Indosialis
                - †Eosialis
            - Ilyobius
          - Sialis lineage
            - Caribesialis
            - - Protosialis
              - - †Proindosialis (putative position)
                - Sialis

Note: the fossil genus †Haplosialodes is not included in the phylogeny, as it was described one year later. However, it is likely most closely related to either Stenosialis or Haplosialis.
