= List of sequenced algae genomes =

This list of sequenced algal genomes contains algal species known to have publicly available complete genome sequences that have been assembled, annotated and published. Unassembled genomes are not included, nor are organelle-only sequences. For plant genomes see the list of sequenced plant genomes. For plastid sequences, see the list of sequenced plastomes. For all kingdoms, see the list of sequenced genomes.

== Dinoflagellates (Alveolata) ==
See also List of sequenced protist genomes.

Organism strain	Type	Relevance	Genome size	Number of genes predicted	Organization	Year of completion	Assembly status	Links
Breviolum minutum (Symbiodinium minutum; clade B1)	Dinoflagellate	Coral symbiont	1.5 Gb	47,014	Okinawa Institute of Science and Technology	2013	Draft	OIST Marine Genomics
Cladocopium goreaui (Symbiodinium goreaui; clade C, type C1)	Dinoflagellate	Coral symbiont	1.19 Gb	35,913	Reef Future Genomics (ReFuGe) 2020 / University of Queensland	2018	Draft	ReFuGe 2020
Cladocopium C92 strain Y103 (Symbiodinium sp. clade C; putative type C92)	Dinoflagellate	Foraminiferan symbiont	Unknown (assembly size 0.70 Gb)	65,832	Okinawa Institute of Science and Technology	2018	Draft	OIST Marine Genomics
Fugacium kawagutii CS156=CCMP2468 (Symbiodinium kawagutii; clade F1)	Dinoflagellate	Coral symbiont?	1.07 Gb	26,609	Reef Future Genomics (ReFuGe) 2020 / University of Queensland	2018	Draft	ReFuGe 2020
Fugacium kawagutii CCMP2468 (Symbiodinium kawagutii; clade F1)	Dinoflagellate	Coral symbiont?	1.18 Gb	36,850	University of Connecticut / Xiamen University	2015	Draft	S. kawagutii genome project
Polarella glacialis CCMP1383	Dinoflagellate	Psychrophile, Antarctic	3.02 Gb (diploid), 1.48 Gbp (haploid)	58,232	University of Queensland	2020	Draft	UQ eSpace
Polarella glacialis CCMP2088	Dinoflagellate	Psychrophile, Arctic	2.65 Gb (diploid), 1.30 Gbp (haploid)	51,713	University of Queensland	2020	Draft	UQ eSpace
Symbiodinium microadriaticum (clade A)	Dinoflagellate	Coral symbiont	1.1 Gb	49,109	King Abdullah University of Science and Technology	2016	Draft	Reef Genomics
Symbiodinium A3 strain Y106 (Symbiodinium sp. clade A3)	Dinoflagellate	symbiont	Unknown (assembly size 0.77 Gb)	69,018	Okinawa Institute of Science and Technology	2018	Draft	OIST Marine Genomics

== Cryptomonad ==
Organism strain	Type	Relevance	Genome size	Number of genes predicted	Organization	Year of completion	Assembly status	Links
Cryptophyceae sp. CCMP2293	Nanoflagellate	Nucleomorph, Psychrophile	534.5 Mb	33,051	Joint Genome Institute	2016		JGI Genome Portal
Guillardia theta		Eukaryote Endosymbiosis	87.2 Mb	24, 840	Dalhousie University	2012		The Greenhouse

== Glaucophyte ==
Organism strain	Type	Relevance	Genome size	Number of genes predicted	Organization	Year of completion	Assembly status	Links
Cyanophora paradoxa		Model Organism	70.2 Mb	3,900	Rutgers University	2012	Draft v1	The Greenhouse Cyanophora Genome Project
Cyanophora paradoxa		Model Organism	99.94 Mb	25,831	Rutgers University	2019	Draft v2	Cyanophora Genome Project

== Green algae ==
Organism strain	Type	Relevance	Genome size	Number of genes predicted	Organization	Year of completion	Assembly status	Links
Asterochloris sp. Cgr/DA1pho		Photobiont	55.8 Mb	10,025	Duke University	2011		JGI Genome Portal
Auxenochlorella protothecoides		Biofuels	22.9 Mb	7,039	Tsinghua University	2014		The Greenhouse
Bathycoccus prasinos		Comparative analysis	15.1 Mb	7,900	Joint Genome Institute	2012		JGI Genome Portal
Chlamydomonas reinhardtii CC-503 cw92 mt+		Model Organism	111.1 Mb	17,741	Joint Genome Institute	2017		Phytozome The Greenhouse
Chlorella sorokiniana str. 1228		Biofuels	61.4 Mb		Los Alamos National Lab	2018		The Greenhouse
Chlorella sorokiniana UTEX 1230		Biofuels	58.5 Mb		Los Alamos National Lab	2018		The Greenhouse
Chlorella sorokiniana DOE1412		Biofuels	57.8 Mb		Los Alamos National Lab	2018		The Greenhouse
Chlorella variabilis NC64A		Biofuels	46.2 Mb	9,791		2010		The Greenhouse
Chlorella vulgaris		Biofuels	37.3 Mb		National Renewable Energy Laboratory	2015		The Greenhouse
Coccomyxa subellipsoidea sp. C-169		Biofuels	48.8 Mb	9839	Joint Genome Institute	2012		Phytozome The Greenhouse
Dunaliella salina CCAP19/18		Halophile Biofuels Beta-carotene and glycerol production	343.7 Mb	16,697	Joint Genome Institute	2017		Phytozome
Eudorina sp.		Multicellular alga, model organism	~180 Mb		University of Tokyo	2018		
Gonium pectorale			148.81 Mb		Kansas State University	2016		
Micromonas commoda NOUM17 (RCC288)		Marine phytoplankton	21.0 Mb	10,262	Monterey Bay Aquarium Research Institute	2013		JGI Genome Portal
Micromonas pusilla CCMP-1545		Marine phytoplankton	21.9 Mb	10,575	Micromonas Genome Consortium	2009		Phytozome The Greenhouse
Micromonas pusilla RCC299/NOUM17		Marine phytoplankton	20.9 Mb	10,056	Joint Genome Institute	2009		Phytozome The Greenhouse
Monoraphidium neglectum		Biofuels	69.7 Mb	16,755	Bielefeld University	2013		The Greenhouse
Ostreococcus lucimarinus CCE9901		Small genome	13.2 Mb	7,603	Joint Genome Institute	2007		Phytozome
Ostreococcus tauri OTH95		Small genome	12.9 Mb	7,699	CNRS	2014		The Greenhouse
Ostreococcus sp. RCC809		Small genome	13.3 Mb	7,492	Joint Genome Institute	2009		JGI
Picochlorum soloecismus DOE101		Biofuels	15.2 Mb	7,844	Los Alamos National Lab	2017		The Greenhouse
Picochlorum SENEW3		Biofuels	13.5 Mb	7,367	Rutgers University	2014		The Greenhouse
Scenedesmus obliquus DOE0152Z		Biofuels	210.3 Mb		Brooklyn College	2017		The Greenhouse
Symbiochloris reticulata (Metagenome)		Photobiont	58.6 Mb	12,720	Joint Genome Institute	2018		JGI Genome Portal
Tetraselmis sp.		Biofuels	228 Mb		Los Alamos National Lab	2018		The Greenhouse
Pedinomonas minor (Chlorophyta)			55 Mb		New Phytologist	2022		
Volvox carteri		Multicellular alga, model organism	131.2 Mb	14,247	Joint Genome Institute	2010		Phytozome The Greenhouse
Yamagishiella unicocca		Multicellular alga, model organism	~140 Mb		University of Tokyo	2018		

== Haptophyte ==
Organism strain	Type	Relevance	Genome size	Number of genes predicted	Organization	Year of completion	Assembly status	Links
Chrysochromulina parva		Biofuels	65.8 Mb		Los Alamos National Laboratory	2018		The Greenhouse
Chrysochromulina tobinii CCMP291		Model organism, Biofuels	59.1 Mb	16,765	University of Washington	2015		The Greenhouse
Emiliania huxleyi	Coccolithophore	Alkenone production, Algal blooms	167.7 Mb	38,554	Joint Genome Institute	2013		The Greenhouse
Pavlovales sp. CCMP2436		Psychrophile	165.4 Mb	26,034	Joint Genome Institute	2016		JGI Genome Portal

== Heterokonts/Stramenopiles ==
Organism strain	Type	Relevance	Genome size	Number of genes predicted	Organization	Year of completion	Assembly status	Links
Aureococcus anophagefferens		Harmful Algal Bloom	50.1 Mb	11,522	Joint Genome Institute	2011		The Greenhouse
Ectocarpus siliculosus	Brown algae	Model organism	198.5 Mb	16,269	Genoscope	2012		The Greenhouse
Fragilariopsis cylindrus CCMP1102		Psychrophile	61.1 Mb	21,066	University of East Anglia, Joint Genome Institute	2017		JGI Genome Portal
Nannochloropsis gaditana		Biofuels	28.5 Mb	10,486	University of Padua	2014		The Greenhouse
Nannochloropsis oceanica		Biofuels	31.5 Mb		Chinese Academy of Sciences, Qingdao Institute of Bioenergy and Bioprocess Technology	2016		The Greenhouse
Nannochloropsis Salina CCMP1766		Biofuels	24.4 Mb		Chinese Academy of Sciences, Qingdao Institute of Bioenergy and Bioprocess Technology	2016		The Greenhouse
Ochromonadaceae sp. CCMP2298		Psychrophile	61.1 Mb	20,195	Joint Genome Institute	2016		JGI Genome Portal
Pelagophyceae sp. CCMP2097		Psychrophile	85.2 Mb	19,402	Joint Genome Institute	2016		JGI Genome Portal
Phaeodactylum tricornutum		Model organism	27.5 Mb	10,408	Diatom Consortium	2008		The Greenhouse
Pseudo-nitzschia multiseries CLN-47			218.7 Mb	19,703	Joint Genome Institute	2011		JGI Genome Portal
Saccharina japonica	Brown algae	Commercial crop	543.4 Mb		Chinese Academy of Sciences, Beijing Institutes of Life Science	2015		The Greenhouse
Thalassiosira oceanica CCMP 1005		Model organism	92.2 Mb	34,642	The Future Ocean	2012		The Greenhouse
Thalassiosira pseudonana		model organism	32.4 Mb	11,673	Diatom Consortium	2009		The Greenhouse

== Red algae (Rhodophyte) ==
Organism strain	Type	Relevance	Genome size	Number of genes predicted	Organization	Year of completion	Assembly status	Links
Chondrus crispus		Carrageenan production, model organism	105 Mb	9,606	Genoscope	2013		The Greenhouse
Cyanidioschyzon merolae 10D		Model organism	16.5 Mb	4,775	National Institute of Genetics, Japan	2007		The Greenhouse
Galdieria sulphuraria		Extremophile	12.1 Mb		The University of York	2016		The Greenhouse
Gracilariopsis chorda		Mesophile	92.1 Mb	10,806	Sungkyunkwan University	2018		
Porphyridium purpureum		Mesophile	19.7 Mb	8,355	Rutgers University	2013		
Porphyra umbilicalis		Mariculture	87.6 Mb	13,360	University of Maine	2017		Phytozome
Pyropia yezoensis		Mariculture	43.5 Mb	10,327	National Research Institute of Fisheries Science	2013		

== Rhizaria ==
Organism strain	Type	Relevance	Genome size	Number of genes predicted	Organization	Year of completion	Assembly status	Links
Bigelowiella natans		Model organism	94. Mb	21,708	Dalhousie University	2012		The Greenhouse
