= List of sequenced protist genomes =

This list of sequenced protist genomes contains all the protist species known to have publicly available complete genome sequences that have been assembled, annotated and published; draft genomes are not included, nor are organelle only sequences.

== Alveolata ==
Alveolata are a group of protists which includes the Ciliophora, Apicomplexa and Dinoflagellata. Members of this group are of particular interest to science as the cause of serious human and livestock diseases.

Organism	Type	Relevance	Genome size	Number of genes predicted	Organization	Year of completion	Assembly status	Links
Babesia bovis	Apicomplexan	Cattle pathogen	8.2 Mb	3,671		2007		
Breviolum minutim (Symbiodinium minutum; clade B1)	Dinoflagellate	Coral symbiont	1.5 Gb	47,014	Okinawa Institute of Science and Technology	2013	Draft	OIST Marine Genomics
Cladocopium goreaui (Symbiodinium goreaui; Clade C1)	Dinoflagellate	Coral symbiont	1.19 Gb	35,913	Reef Future Genomics (ReFuGe) 2020/ University of Queensland	2018	Draft	ReFuGe 2020
Cladocopium C92 strain Y103 (Symbiodinium sp. clade C; putative type C92)	Dinoflagellate	Foraminiferan symbiont	Unknown (assembly size 0.70 Gb)	65,832	Okinawa Institute of Science and Technology	2018	Draft	OIST Marine Genomics
Cryptosporidium hominis Strain:TU502	Apicomplexan	Human pathogen	10.4 Mb	3,994	Virginia Commonwealth University	2004		
Cryptosporidium parvum C- or genotype 2 isolate	Apicomplexan	Human pathogen	16.5 Mb	3,807	UCSF and University of Minnesota	2004		
Eimeria tenella Houghton strain	Apicomplexan	Intestinal parasite of domestic fowl	55-60 Mb		The Wellcome Trust Sanger Institute	Available for download; 2007 for Chr 1		
Fugacium kawagutii CS156=CCMP2468 (Symbiodinium kawagutii; clade F1)	Dinoflagellate	Coral symbiont?	1.07 Gb	26,609	Reef Future Genomics (ReFuGe) 2020 / University of Queensland	2018	Draft	ReFuGe 2020
Fugacium kawagutii CCMP2468 (Symbiodinium kawagutii; clade F1)	Dinoflagellate	Coral symbiont?	1.18 Gb	36,850	University of Connecticut / Xiamen University	2015	Draft	S. kawagutii genome project
Neospora caninum	Apicomplexan	Pathogen for cattle and dogs	62 Mb		The Wellcome Trust Sanger Institute	Available for download		
Paramecium tetraurelia	Ciliate	Model organism	72 Mb	39,642	Genoscope	2006		
Polarella glacialis CCMP1383	Dinoflagellate	Psychrophile, Antarctic	3.02 Gb (diploid), 1.48 Gbp (haploid)	58,232	University of Queensland	2020	Draft	UQ eSpace
Polarella glacialis CCMP2088	Dinoflagellate	Psychrophile, Arctic	2.65 Gb (diploid), 1.30 Gbp (haploid)	51,713	University of Queensland	2020	Draft	UQ eSpace
Plasmodium berghei ANKA	Apicomplexan	Rabbit malaria	18.5 Mb	4,900; 11,654 (UniProt)				
Plasmodium chabaudi	Apicomplexan	Rodent malaria	19.8 Mb	5,000				
Plasmodium falciparum Clone:3D7	Apicomplexan	Human pathogen (malaria)	22.9 Mb	5,268	Malaria Genome Project Consortium	2002		
Plasmodium knowlesi	Apicomplexan	Primate pathogen (malaria)	23.5 Mb	5,188		2008		
Plasmodium vivax	Apicomplexan	Human pathogen (malaria)	26.8 Mb	5,433		2008		
Plasmodium yoelii yoelii Strain:17XNL	Apicomplexan	Rodent pathogen (malaria)	23.1 Mb	5,878	TIGR and NMRC	2002		
Symbiodinium microadriaticum (clade A)	Dinoflagellate	Coral symbiont	1.1 Gb	49,109	King Abdullah University of Science and Technology	2016	Draft	Reef Genomics
Symbiodinium A3 strain Y106 (Symbiodinium sp. clade A3)	Dinoflagellate	symbiont	Unknown (assembly size 0.77 Gb)	69,018	Okinawa Institute of Science and Technology	2018	Draft	OIST Marine Genomics
Tetrahymena thermophila	Ciliate	Model organism	104 Mb	27,000		2006		
Theileria annulata Ankara clone C9	Apicomplexan	Cattle pathogen	8.3 Mb	3,792	Sanger	2005		
Theileria parva Strain:Muguga	Apicomplexan	Cattle pathogen (African east coast fever)	8.3 Mb	4,035	TIGR and the International Livestock Research Institute	2005		
Toxoplasma gondii GT1, ME49, VEG strains	Apicomplexan	Mammal pathogen	63 Mb (RefSeq)	8,100 (UniProt) - 9,000 (EuPathDB)	J. Craig Venter Inst., TIGR, UPenn.	2008		

== Amoebozoa ==
Amoebozoa are a group of motile amoeboid protists, members of this group move or feed by means of temporary projections, called pseudopods. The best known member of this group is the slime mold, which has been studied for centuries; other members include the Archamoebae, Tubulinea and Flabellinia. Some Amoeboza cause disease.

Organism	Type	Relevance	Genome size	Number of genes predicted	Organization	Year of completion
Dictyostelium discoideum Strain:AX4	Slime mold	Model organism	34 Mb	12,500	Consortium from University of Cologne, Baylor College of Medicine and the Sanger Centre	2005
Entamoeba histolytica HM1:IMSS	Parasitic protozoan	Human pathogen (amoebic dysentery)	23.8 Mb	9,938	TIGR, Sanger Institute and the London School of Hygiene and Tropical Medicine	2005
Polysphondylium pallidum Strain:PN500	Slime mold	Model organism		12,939, 12,350 (UniProt)	Leibniz Institute for Age Research	2009

== Chromista ==
The Chromista are a group of protists that contains the algal phyla Heterokontophyta (stramenopiles), Haptophyta and Cryptophyta. Members of this group are mostly studied for evolutionary interest.

Organism	Type	Relevance	Genome size	Number of genes predicted	Organization	Year of completion
Albugo laibachii	Oomycete	Arabidopsis parasite, biotroph	37 Mb	13,032		2011
Aureococcus anophagefferens Strain:CCMP1984	Pelagophyte				DOE Joint Genome Institute	2011
Bigelowiella natans	Chlorarachniophyte	Model organism	nucleomorph: 0.331 Mb nuclear: 95 Mb	nucleomorph: 373 nuclear: >21,000	nucleomorph: Hall Institute Australia, Univ. Melbourne, Univ. BC nuclear: Dalhousie University, Halifax, Nova Scotia, Canada	2006, 2012
Chroomonas mesostigmatica CCMP1168	Cryptophyta					2012
Cryptomonas paramecium	Cryptophyta					2010
Emiliania huxleyi CCMP1516	Coccolithophore (phytoplankton)		141.7 Mb	30,569	Joint Genome Institute	2013
Emiliania huxleyi RCC1217	Coccolithophore (phytoplankton)					Available for download
Fragilariopsis cylindrus	Diatom		61.1 Mb	21,066	Joint Genome Institute	2017
Guillardia theta	Cryptomonad	Model organism	0.551 Mb (nucleomorph genome only); 87 Mb (nuclear genome)	nucleomorph: 465 513, 598 (UniProt) nuclear: >21,000	nucleomorph: Canadian Institute of Advanced Research, Philipps-University Marburg and the University of British Columbia nuclear: Dalhousie University, Halifax, Nova Scotia, Canada	2001, 2012
Hemiselmis andersenii CCMP7644	Cryptomonad	Model organism	0.572 Mb (nucleomorph genome only)	472, 502 (UniProt)	Canadian Institute of Advanced Research	2007
Hyaloperonospora arabidopsidis	Oomycete	obligate biotroph, Arabidopsis pathogen			WUGSC	2010
Nannochloropis gaditana Strain: CCMP526	Eustigmatophyte	Lipid-producing, biotechnology applications			Virginia Bioinformatics Institute	2012
Phaeodactylum tricornutum Strain: CCAP1055/1	Diatom		27.4 Mb	10,402	Joint Genome Institute	2008
Phytophthora infestans Strain:T30-4	Oomycete	Great Famine of Ireland pathogen			Broad Institute	2009
Phytophthora ramorum	Oomycete	Sudden oak death pathogen	65 Mb (7x)	15,743	Joint Genome Institute et al.	2006
Phytophthora sojae	Oomycete	Soybean pathogen	95 Mb (9x)	19,027	Joint Genome Institute et al.	2006
Pseudo-nitzschia multiseries	Diatom			Joint Genome Institute		
Plasmodiophora brassicae	Plasmodiophorid	Clubroot disease pathogen	25.5 Mb	9,730	SLU Uppsala et al.	2015
Pythium ultimum	Oomycete	ubiquitous plant pathogen	42.8 Mb	15,290	Michigan State University et al.	2010
Thalassiosira pseudonana Strain:CCMP 1335	Diatom		34.5 Mb	11,242	Joint Genome Institute and the University of Washington	2004

== Excavata ==
Excavata is a group of related free living and symbiotic protists; it includes the Metamonada, Loukozoa, Euglenozoa and Percolozoa. They are researched for their role in human disease.

Organism	Type	Relevance	Genome size	Number of genes predicted	Organization	Year of completion
Giardia enterica (G. duodenalis assemblage B)	Parasitic protozoan	Human pathogen (Giardiasis)	11.7 Mb	4,470	multicenter collaboration	2009
Giardia duodenalis ATCC 50803 (Giardia duodenalis assemblage A)	Parasitic protozoan	Human pathogen (Giardiasis)	11.7 Mb	6,470, 7,153 (UniProt)	Karolinska Institutet, Marine Biological Laboratory	2007
Leishmania braziliensis MHOM/BR/75M2904	Parasitic protozoan	Human pathogen (Leishmaniasis)	33 Mb	8,314	Sanger Institute, Universidade de São Paulo, Imperial College	2007
Leishmania infantum JPCM5	Parasitic protozoan	Human pathogen (Visceral leishmaniasis)	33 Mb	8,195	Sanger Institute, Imperial College and University of Glasgow	2007
Leishmania major Strain:Friedlin	Parasitic protozoan	Human pathogen (Cutaneous leishmaniasis)	32.8 Mb	8,272	Sanger Institute and Seattle Biomedical Research Institute	2005
Naegleria gruberi	amoeboflagellate	Diverged from other eukaryotes over 1 billion years ago	41 Mb	15,727		2010
Trichomonas vaginalis	Parasitic protozoan	Human pathogen (Trichomoniasis)	160 Mb	59,681	TIGR	2007
Trypanosoma brucei Strain:TREU927/4 GUTat10.1	Parasitic protozoan	Human pathogen (Sleeping sickness)	26 Mb	9,068	Sanger Institute and TIGR	2005
Trypanosoma cruzi Strain:CL Brener TC3	Parasitic protozoan	Human pathogen (Chagas disease)	34 Mb	22,570	TIGR, Seattle Biomedical Research Institute and Uppsala University	2005

== Opisthokonts, basal ==
Opisthokonts are a group of eukaryotes that include both animals and fungi as well as basal groups that are not classified in these groups. These basal opisthokonts are reasonably categorized as protists and include choanoflagellates, which are the sister or near-sister group of animals.

Organism	Type	Relevance	Genome size	Number of genes predicted	Organization	Year of completion
Monosiga brevicollis	Choanoflagellate	close relative of metazoans	41.6 Mb	9,200	Joint Genome Institute	2007

== See also ==
- Lists of sequenced genomes
- List of sequenced bacterial genomes
- List of sequenced archaeal genomes
- List of sequenced eukaryotic genomes
- Lists of sequenced mitochondrial genomes
- List of sequenced plastomes
- List of sequenced animal genomes
- List of sequenced animal mitochondrial genomes
- List of sequenced fungi genomes
- List of sequenced fungi mitochondrial genomes
- List of sequenced plant genomes
- List of sequenced plant mitochondrial genomes
- List of sequenced algae genomes
