= List of sequenced plant genomes =

This list of sequenced plant genomes contains plant species known to have publicly available complete genome sequences that have been assembled, annotated and published. Unassembled genomes are not included, nor are organelle only sequences. For all kingdoms, see the list of sequenced genomes. For mitochondrial genomes, see list of sequenced plant mitochondrial genomes, For plastid genomes, see list of sequenced plastomes.

See also List of sequenced algae genomes.

== Bryophytes ==
Organism strain	Division	Relevance	Genome size	Number of genes predicted	Organization	Year of completion	Assembly status
Anthoceros angustus	Bryophytes	Hornwort, early diverging land plant	119.3 Mb		Institute of Botany, Chinese Academy of Sciences	2020	
Ceratodon purpureus	Bryophytes	Land moss, early diverging land plant	362.5 Mb	31,482	DOE Joint Genome Institute	2020	
Fontinalis antipyretica (greater water-moss)	Bryophytes	Aquatic moss	385.2 Mbp	16,538	BGI	2020	BGISEQ-500 & 10X, scaffold N50 45.8 Kbp
Marchantia polymorpha	Bryophytes	Liverwort, early diverging land plant	225.8 Mb	19,138		2017	
Physcomitrella patens ssp. patens str. Gransden 2004	Bryophytes	Early diverging land plant	462.3 Mbp	35,938		2008	
Pleurozium schreberi (feather moss)	Bryophytes	Ubiquitous moss species	318 Mbp	15,992		2019	
Climacium dendroides (tree climacium moss)	Bryophytes	Ubiquitous moss species	413.1 Mbp			2024	

== Vascular plants ==
=== Lycophytes ===
Organism strain	Division	Relevance	Genome size	Number of genes predicted	Organization	Year of completion	Assembly status
Isoetes sinensis (narrow quillwort)	Lycopodiophyta	Aquatic quillwort	2131 Mb	57,303		2023	Scaffold N50 = 86 Mb
Selaginella moellendorffii	Lycopodiophyta	Model organism	106 Mb	22,285		2011	scaffold N50 = 1.7 Mb
Selaginella lepidophylla	Lycopodiophyta	Desiccation tolerance	122 Mb	27,204		2018	contig N50 = 163 kb

=== Ferns ===
Organism strain	Division	Relevance	Genome size	Number of genes predicted	Organization	Year of completion	Assembly status
Azolla filiculoides	Polypodiophyta	Fern	0.75 Gb	20,201		2018	
Salvinia cucullata	Polypodiophyta	Fern	0.26 Gb	19,914		2018	
Ceratopteris richardii	Polypodiophyta	Model organism	7.5 Gb	36,857		2019 (v1.1), 2021 (v2.1)	Partial assembly consisting of 7.5 Gb/11.2 Gb, arranged in 39 chromosomes
Alsophila spinulosa	Polypodiophyta	Tree Fern	6.23 Gb	67,831		2022	

=== Gymnosperms ===
Organism strain	Division	Relevance	Genome size	Number of genes predicted	No of chromosomes	Organization	Year of completion	Assembly status
Cycas panzhihuaensis (Dukou sago palm)	Cycadophyta	Rare and vulnerable species of cycad	10.5 Gb				2022	
Picea abies (Norway spruce)	Pinales	Timber, tonewood, ornamental such as Christmas tree	19.6 Gb	26,359	12	Umeå Plant Science Centre / SciLifeLab, Sweden	2013	
Picea glauca (White spruce)	Pinales	Timber, Pulp	20.8 Gb	14,462	12	Institutional Collaboration	2013	
Pinus taeda (Loblolly pine)	Pinales	Timber	20.15 Gb	9,024	12		2014	N50 scaffold size: 66.9 kbp
Pinus lambertiana (Sugar pine)	Pinales	Timber; with the largest genomes among the pines; the largest pine species	31 Gb	13,936	12		2016	61.5X sequence coverage, platforms used: Hiseq 2000, Hiseq 2500, GAIIx, MiSeq
Taxus wallichiana (Himalayan Yew)	Pinales	Key species for paclitaxel (Taxol) production	~20.3 Gb		24		2025	Contig N50 = 169.4 Mb; Only 201 gaps; Anchoring rate = 97.5%
Ginkgo biloba	Ginkgoales		11.75 Gb	41,840			2016	N50 scaffold size: 48.2 kbp
Pseudotsuga menziesii	Pinales		16 Gb	54,830	13		2017	N50 scaffold size : 340.7 kbp
Gnetum monatum	Gnetales		4.07 Gb	27,491			2018	
Larix sibirica	Pinales		12.34 Gbp				2019	scaffold N50 of 6440 bp
Abies alba	Pinales		18.16 Gb	94,205			2019	scaffold N50 of 14,051 bp
Pinus massoniana (Masson's Pine)	Pinophyta	Plantation Forestry	21.91 Gb	80,366		BGI	2025	
Pinus pinea (Stone pine )	Pinophyta	Food Crop						
Pinus albicaulis (Whitebark pine )	Pinophyta	Food Crop	27.6				2025	

=== Angiosperms ===
==== Amborellales ====
Organism strain	Family	Relevance	Genome size	Number of genes predicted	Organization	Year of completion	Assembly status
Amborella trichopoda	Amborellaceae	Basal angiosperm	706.3 Mb	19,521	Amborella Genome Sequencing Project	2013	Scaffold N50 of 4.9 Mb
Angophora floribunda	Myrtaceae	Angiosperm			Genome Research		
Cardamine chenopodiifolia	Brassicaceae	Angiosperm	597.2 Mb			2024	N50 of 18.8 Mb

==== Chloranthales ====
Organism strain	Family	Relevance	Genome size	Number of genes predicted	Organization	Year of completion	Assembly status
Chloranthus spicatus (Thunb.) Makino, (Pearl Orchid)	Chloranthaceae	Early-diverging angiosperm	2,964 Mb	21,392	10KP project	2021	Scaffold N50 of 191.37 Mb

==== Magnoliids ====
Organism strain	Family	Relevance	Genome size	Number of genes predicted	Organization	Year of completion	Assembly status
Annona muricata	Annonaceae	Commercial fruit, medicinal	799.11 Mb	23,375	Institute for Biodiversity and Environmental Research (UBD) Alliance for Conservation Tree Genomics; Biodiversity Genomics Team	2021	v2 scaffold N50 of 93.2 Mb, total size in chromosomes: 639.6 Mb
Salix arbutifolia (syn. Chosenia arbutifolia)	Salicaceae	Seriously endangered relic species	338.93 Mb	33,229		2022	Contig N50 of 1.68 Mb
Cinnamomum kanehirae (Stout camphor tree)	Lauraceae		730.7 Mb			2019	
Magnolia sinica (Huagaimu)	Magnoliaceae	critically endangered and botanically significant	1.84 Gb	43,473	Oxford University Press, GigaScience, GigaScience Press	2024	Illumina, Oxford Nanopore Technologies (ONT), Hi-C scaffolding. contig N50 = ~45Mb, scaffold N50: 92 Mb

==== Eudicots ====
===== Proteales =====
Organism strain	Family	Relevance	Genome size	Number of genes predicted	Organization	Year of completion	Assembly status
Macadamia integrifolia HAES 741 (macadamia nut)	Proteaceae	Commercial nut	745 Mb	34,274		2020	Scaffold N50 of 34.2 Mb
Macadamia jansenii	Proteaceae	Rare relative of macadamia nut	750 Mb			2020	Compared Nanopore, Illumina and BGI stLRF data
Nelumbo nucifera (sacred lotus)	Nelumbonaceae	Basal eudicot	929 Mb	28,312	UIUC	2013	contig N50 of 38.8 kbp and a scaffold N50 of 3.4 Mbp
Boehmeria nivea (Ramie)	Urticaceae	Fiber production, economic importance, ecological value	340 Mb	27,664		2023	522 contigs, N50 of 1.36Mb

===== Ranunculales =====
Organism strain	Family	Relevance	Genome size	Number of genes predicted	Organization	Year of completion	Assembly status
Aquilegia coerulea 'Goldsmith'	Ranunculaceae	Basal eudicot	302 Mb	24,823	JGI-PGF	Unpublished	Scaffold N50 of 4.2 Mb

===== Trochodendrales =====
Organism strain	Family	Relevance	Genome size	Number of genes predicted	Organization	Year of completion	Assembly status
Trochodendron aralioides (Wheel tree)	Trochodendrales	Basal eudicot having secondary xylem without vessel elements	1.614 Gb	35,328	Guangxi University	2019	19 scaffolds corresponding to 19 chromosomes

===== Caryophyllales =====
Organism strain	Family	Relevance	Genome size	Number of genes predicted	Organization	Year of completion	Assembly status
Beta vulgaris subsp. vulgaris 'EL10' (sugar beet)	Amaranthaceae	Crop plant	568.8 Mb	30,391		2013	2022 reference genome - scaffold N50 of 62 Mb
Chenopodium quinoa 'QQ74'	Amaranthaceae	Crop plant	1300 Mb	58,882		2017	3,486 scaffolds, scaffold N50 of 3.84 Mb, 90% of the assembled genome is contained in 439 scaffolds
Amaranthus hypocondriacus	Amaranthaceae	Crop plant	403.9 Mb	23,847		2016	16 large scaffolds from 16.9 to 38.1 Mb. N50 and L50 of the assembly was 24.4 Mb and 7, respectively.
Carnegiea gigantea	Cactaceae	Wild cactus	1100 Mb	34,209		2017	SGP5-SGP5p (2023) scaffold N50 of 0.468 Mb
Nepenthes mirabilis	Nepenthes	Carnivorous pitcher plant	691.4 Mb	42,961		2023	High-quality long-read assembly using PacBio CCS and RNA-seq data.: 159,555 contigs/scaffolds and N50 of 10,307 bp
Suaeda aralocaspica	Amaranthaceae	Performs complete C_{4} photosynthesis within individual cells (SCC_{4})	451.7 Mb	29,604	ABLife Inc.	2019	Scaffold N50 of 1.7 Mb (2021)
Simmondsia chinensis (jojoba 'Jojobamale2')	Simmondsiaceae	Oilseed crop	831.5 Mb	23,490		2020	Scaffold N50 of 35.8 Mb (2021)
Drosera capensis	Droseraceae	Carnivorous sundew	263.79 Mb			2016	Scaffold N50 of 0.083 Mb
Tamarix chinensis (Chinese tamarisk)	Tamaricaceae	Margin tree	1320 Mb			2023	Scaffold N50 of 110 Mb
Cistanthe cachinalensis (Atacama pussypaw)	Montiaceae	Herbaceous plant				2025	

===== Rosids =====
Organism strain	Family	Relevance	Genome size	Number of genes predicted	No of chromosomes	Organization	Year of completion	Assembly status
Bretschneidera sinensis	Akaniaceae	endangered relic tree species	1213.76 Mb	45,839	9		2022	Scaffold N50 of 146.5 Mb
Sclerocarya birrea (Marula)	Anacardiaceae	Used for food		18,397			2018	
Begonia masoniana (Iron cross begonia)	Begoniaceae	Flower	799.83 Mb	22,861	30		2022	contig N50: 0.44 Mb
Begonia darthvaderiana	Begoniaceae	Ornamental plant	724 Mb	23,444	30		2022	contig N50: 0.32 Mb
Begonia loranthoides	Begoniaceae	Ornnamental plant	797 Mb	22,059	38		2022	scaffold N50: 6.73 Mb
Begonia peltatifolia (Rex begonia)	Begoniaceae	Flower	331.75 Mb	23,010	30		2022	scaffold N50: 3.20 Mb
Betula pendula (silver birch)	Betulaceae	Boreal forest tree, model for forest biotechnology	435 Mbp	28,399	14	University of Helsinki	2017	454/Illumina/PacBio. Assembly size 435 Mbp. Contig N50: 48,209 bp, scaffold N50: 239,796 bp. 89% of the assembly mapped to 14 pseudomolecules. Additionally 150 birch individuals sequenced.
Betula platyphylla (Japanese white birch)	Betulaceae	Pioneer hardwood tree species	430 Mbp				2021	contig N50 = 751 kbp
Betula nana (dwarf birch)	Betulaceae	Arctic shrub	450 Mbp			QMUL/SBCS	2013	
Corylus heterophylla Fisch (Asian hazel)	Betulaceae	Nut tree used for food	370.75 Mbp	27,591	11		2021	Nanopore/Hi-C chromosome scale. Contig N50 and scaffold N50 sizes of 2.07 and 31.33 Mb, respectively
Corylus mandshurica	Betulaceae	Hazel used for breeding	367.67 Mb	28,409	11		2021	
Aethionema arabicum	Brassicaceae	Comparative analysis of crucifer genomes					2013	
Arabidopsis lyrata ssp. lyrata strain MN47	Brassicaceae	Model plant	206.7 Mbp	32,670	8		2011	8.3X sequence coverage, analyzed on ABI 3730XL capillary sequencers
Arabidopsis thaliana Ecotype:Columbia	Brassicaceae	Model plant	135 Mbp	27,655	5	AGI	2000	
Barbarea vulgaris G-type	Brassicaceae	Model plant for specialised metabolites and plant defenses	167.7 Mbp	25,350	8		2017	66.5 X coverage with Illumina GA II technology
Brassica rapa ssp. pekinensis (Chinese cabbage) accession Chiifu-401-42	Brassicaceae	Assorted crops and model organism	485 Mbp	41,174 (has undergone genome triplication)	10	The Brassica rapa Genome Sequencing Project Consortium	2011	72X coverage of paired short read sequences generated by Illumina GA II technology
Brassica napus (Oilseed rape or rapeseed) European winter oilseed cultivar 'Darmor-bzh'	Brassicaceae	Crops	1130 Mbp	101,040	19	Institutional Collaboration	2014	454 GS-FLX+ Titanium (Roche, Basel, Switzerland) and Sanger sequencing. Correction and gap filling used 79 Gb of Illumina (San Diego, CA) HiSeq sequence.
Capsella rubella	Brassicaceae	Close relative of Arabidopsis thaliana	130 Mbp	26,521		JGI	2013? 2013	
Cardamine hirsuta (hairy bittercress) strain 'Oxford'	Brassicaceae	A model system for studies in evolution of plant development	198 Mbp	29,458	8	Max Planck Institute for Plant Breeding Research, Köln, Germany	2016	Shotgun sequencing strategy, combining paired end reads (197× assembled sequence coverage) and mate pair reads (66× assembled) from Illumina HiSeq (a total of 52 Gbp raw reads).
Eruca sativa (salad rocket)	Brassicaceae	Used for food	851 Mbp	45,438		University of Reading	2020	Illumina MiSeq and HiSeq2500. PCR free paired end and long mate pair sequencing and assembly. Illumina HiSeq transcriptome sequencing (125/150 bp paired end reads).
Erysimum cheiranthoides (wormseed wallflower) strain 'Elbtalaue'	Brassicaceae	Model plant for studying defensive chemistry, including cardiac glycosides	175 Mbp	29,947	8	Boyce Thompson Institute, Ithaca, NY	2020	39.5 Gb PacBio sequences (average length 10,603 bp), one lane Illumina MiSeq sequencing (2 x 250 bp paired end), Phase Genomics Hi-C scaffolding, PacBio and Illumina transcriptome sequencing
Eutrema salsugineum	Brassicaceae	A relative of arabidopsis with high salt tolerance	240 Mbp	26,351		JGI	2013	
Eutrema parvulum	Brassicaceae	Comparative analysis of crucifer genomes					2013	
Leavenworthia alabamica	Brassicaceae	Comparative analysis of crucifer genomes					2013	
Sisymbrium irio	Brassicaceae	Comparative analysis of crucifer genomes					2013	
Thellungiella parvula	Brassicaceae	A relative of arabidopsis with high salt tolerance					2011	
Cannabis sativa (hemp)	Cannabaceae	Hemp and marijuana production	770.3 Mb	35,194			2023	Scaffold N50 of 77 Mb (2023 reference)
Humulus lupulus (European hop)	Cannabaceae	Beer ingredient	2488.1 Mb	57,465			2024	Scaffold N50 of 251.5 Mb
Capparis spinosa var. herbacea (Caper)	Capparaceae	Crop	274.53 Mb	21,577			2022	contig N50 9.36 Mb
Carica papaya (papaya)	Caricaceae	Fruit crop	369.8 Mb	20,332			2008	contig N50 11kbp scaffold N50 1Mbp total coverage ~3x (Sanger) 92.1% unigenes mapped 235Mbp anchored (of this 161Mbp also oriented)
Casuarina equisetifolia (Australian Pine)	Casuarinaceae	bonsai subject	300 Mb	29,827			2018	
Tripterygium wilfordii (Lei gong teng)	Celastraceae	Chinese medicine crop	340.12 Mbp	31,593			2021	Contig N50 3.09 Mbp
Cleome gynandra (African cabbage)	Cleomaceae	C4 leafy vegetable and medicinal plant	740 Mb	30,933			2023	N50 of 42 Mb
Kalanchoë fedtschenkoi	Crassulaceae	Model for obligate CAM species in the eudicots	256.4 Mb	30,964	34		2017	Scaffold N50 of 2.5 Mb
Rhodiola crenulata (Tibetan medicinal herb)	Crassulaceae	Uses for medicine and food	344.5 Mb	35,517			2017	
Citrullus lanatus (watermelon)	Cucurbitaceae	Commercial fruit	373.7 Mb	23,440		BGI	2012	Scaffold N50 of 36.1 Mb (2024 reference)
Cucumis melo (muskmelon)	Cucurbitaceae	Commercial fruit	438.3 Mb	28,628			2012	Scaffold N50 of 30.5 Mb (2022 reference)
Cucumis sativus (cucumber) 'Chinese long' inbred line 9930	Cucurbitaceae	Vegetable crop	224.8 Mb	23,999			2009	Scaffold N50 of 31.1 Mb (2019 reference)
Cucurbita argyrosperma subsp. argyrosperma (Silver-seed gourd)	Cucurbitaceae	Seed and fruit crop	228.8 Mbp	27,998	20	National Autonomous University of Mexico	2019, updated in 2021	contig N50 447 kbp scaffold N50 11.6 Mbp total coverage: 120x Illumina (HiSeq2000 and MiSeq) + 31x PacBio RSII
Cucurbita argyrosperma subsp. sororia (wild gourd)	Cucurbitaceae	Wild relative of the silver-seed gourd	255.2 Mbp	30,592	20	National Autonomous University of Mexico	2021	contig N50 1.2 Mbp scaffold N50 12.1 Mbp total coverage: 213x Illumina HiSeq4000 + 75.4x PacBio Sequel
Gynostemma pentaphyllum (jiaogulan)	Cucurbitaceae	Adaptogen, anti-inflammatory & antioxidant, metabolic health	608.95 Mb	26,588	11 (pseudo-chromosomes)		2023	contig N50 = 5.05Mb, scaffold N50 length = 56.38 Mb
Siraitia grosvenorii (Monk fruit)	Cucurbitaceae	Chinese medicine/sweetener	456.5 Mbp	30,565		Anhui Agricultural University	2018	
Hippophae rhamnoides (sea-buckthorn)	Elaeagnaceae	used in food and cosmetics	730 Mbp	30,812			2022	
Hippophae salicifolia (Sea Buckthorn)	Elaeagnaceae	Understanding sex determination in dioecious plants	Female: 788.28 Mb; Male haplotypes: 1,139.99 Mb and 1,097.34 Mb				2025	High-quality haplotype-resolved genome; SDR located on Chr02
Hevea brasiliensis (rubber tree)	Euphorbiaceae	the most economically important member of the genus Hevea					2013	
Jatropha curcas Palawan	Euphorbiaceae	bio-diesel crop					2011	
Manihot esculenta (cassava/manioc)	Euphorbiaceae	Feeds >500m people in tropics	639.6 Mb	34,312		JGI	2012	Scaffold N50 of 29.2 Mb (2021 reference)
Ricinus communis (castor bean)	Euphorbiaceae	oilseed crop	315.6 Mb	25,340		National Key R&D Program of China, the National Natural Science Foundation of China, the Guangdong Basic and Applied Basic Research Foundation, China, and the Shenzhen Science and Technology Program, China	2021	Scaffold N50 of 31.9 Mb (2021 reference, wild-type replaces previous cultivar as reference for species)
Excoecaria agallocha (milky mangrove)	Euphorbiaceae	Latex-secreting mangrove in tropical and subtropical regions	1,332.45 Mb	73,740			2024	Chromosome-level genome assembly; 18 pseudomolecules (86.08% of sequences anchored); Scaffold N50: 58.9 Mb; BUSCO score: 98.4% (indicating high completeness)
Tylosema esculentum (Marama bean)	Fabaceae	Underutilized orphan legume	558.78 Mb				2025	High-quality de novo assembly using PacBio HiFi + Omni-C scaffolding.: Tools: Hifiasm, HiCanu, HiRise; Metrics: N50 = 22.68 Mb, L50 = 8; BUSCO used for completeness assessment.
Phaseolus vulgaris (common bean)	Fabaceae	Major grain legume	560.3 Mb	29,925	11		2025	Assembly Status: Telomere-to-telomere (T2T) assembly using PacBio HiFi, ONT ultra-long, and Hi-C.; N50 = 55.11 Mb; BUSCO = 99.5%; QV = 54.86; 20 of 22 telomeres identified.
Bauhinia purpurea (Purple Orchid Tree)	Fabaceae	One of the parental species of the hybrid Bauhinia x blakeana.	Estimated: 303.68 Mb; Assembled: ~285.1 Mb; Sequencing coverage: 136.6 Gb (~450×)	38,735	14		2025	Scaffold N50: 21,596,737 bp; Contig N50: 161,057 bp; BUSCO completeness: C: 57.47%, S: 57.47%, D: 0%, F: 14.1%, M: 28.4%; Hi-C anchoring: Anchor size: 285,099,845 bp; Anchor rate: 99.89%
Bauhinia variegata (Mountain ebony/orchid tree)	Fabaceae	Medium-sized deciduous tree native to China	Estimated: ~314.49 Mb; Sequencing coverage: 96.4 Gb (~307×); Assembled: 308,677,314 bp (~308.7 Mb)	40,111	14		2025	Contig N50: 190,234 bp; Scaffold N50: 2,613,106 bp; BUSCO completeness: C: 94.8% [S: 77.6%, D: 17.2%], F: 1.2%, M: 4%
Ammopiptanthus nanus	Fabaceae	Only genus of evergreen broadleaf shrub	889 Mb	37,188			2018	
Cajanus cajan (Pigeon pea) var. Asha	Fabaceae	Model legume	590.4 Mb	33,324			2012	Scaffold N50 of 0.558 Mb (2016)
Arachis duranensis (A genome diploid wild peanut) accession V14167	Fabaceae	Wild ancestor of peanut, an oilseed and grain legume crop					2016	Illumina 154x coverage, contig N50 22 kbp, scaffold N50 948 kbp
Amphicarpaea edgeworthii (Chinese hog-peanut)	Fabaceae	produces both aerial and subterranean fruits	299.1 Mb	27,899		Taishan Scholar Program, National Natural Science Foundation of China, the Innovation Program of SAAS	2021	Scaffold N50 of 27.2 Mb
Arachis ipaensis (B genome diploid wild peanut) accession K30076	Fabaceae	Wild ancestor of peanut, an oilseed and grain legume crop					2016	Illumina 163x coverage, contig N50 23 kbp, scaffold N50 5,343 kbp
Cicer arietinum (chickpea)	Fabaceae	filling					2013	
Cicer arietinum (chickpea)	Fabaceae						2013	
Dalbergia odorifera (fragrant rosewood)	Fabaceae	Wood product (heartwood) and folk medicine	653 Mb	30,310	10	Chinese Academy of Forestry	2020	Contig N50: 5.92Mb Scaffold N50: 56.1 6Mb
Faidherbia albida (Apple-Ring Acacia)	Fabaceae	Importante in the Sahel for raising bees		28,979			2018	
Glycine max (soybean) var. Williams 82	Fabaceae	Protein and oil crop	1115 Mbp	46,430			2010	Contig N50:189.4kbp Scaffold N50:47.8Mbp Sanger coverage ~8x WGS 955.1 Mbp assembled
Lablab purpureus (Hyacinth Bean)	Fabaceae	Crop for human consumption		20,946			2018	
Lotus japonicus (Bird's-foot Trefoil)	Fabaceae	Model legume					2008	
Medicago truncatula (Barrel Medic)	Fabaceae	Model legume					2011	
Melilotus officinalis (sweet yellow clover)	Fabaceae	Forage and Chinese medicine	976.27 Mbp	50,022			2023	
Phaseolus vulgaris (common bean)	Fabaceae	Model bean	520 Mbp	31,638		JGI	2013?	
Prosopis cineraria (Ghaf)	Fabaceae	Desert mimosoid legume	691 Mbp	55,325			2023	
Vicia faba (Faba bean)	Fabaceae					Nature (journal)	2023	
Vicia villosa (hairy vetch)	Fabaceae	Forage and cover crop	2035 Mb	69,562			2023	Scaffold N50 of 174.2 Mb
Vigna hirtella (Wild vigna)	Fabaceae	Wild legume	474.1 Mbp				2023	
Vigna reflexo-pilosa (Créole bean)	Fabaceae	Tetraploid wild legume	998.7 Mbp				2023	
Vigna subterranea (Bambara Groundnut)	Fabaceae	similar to peanuts		31,707			2018	
Vigna trinervia Synonym of mung bean, V. radiata	Fabaceae		498.7 Mb				2023	Scaffold N50 of 1.7 Mb
Trifolium pratense L. (Red clover)	Fabaceae	often used to relieve symptoms of menopause, high cholesterol, and osteoporosis.					2022	
Vicia sativa L. (Common vetch)	Fabaceae	grain to livestock					2022	
Macrotyloma uniflorum (Horse gram)	Fabaceae	horsefeed					2021	
Castanea mollissima (Chinese chestnut)	Fagaceae	cultivated nut	689 Mb	36,479		Beijing University of Agriculture	2019	Scaffold N50 of 57.3 Mb (2020 reference)
Quercus robur (European oak)	Fagaceae	Pedunculate oak, large diversity, somatic mutation studies	736 Mb	25,808	12	Biogeco lab, Inrae, University of Bordeaux	2018	https://www.oakgenome.fr/?page_id=587
Carya illinoinensis Pecan	Junglandaceae	snacks in various recipes	651.31 Mb				2019	
Juglans mandshurica Maxim. (Manchurian walnut)	Junglandaceae	cultivated nut	548.7 Mb				2022	
Juglans regia (Persian walnut)	Junglandaceae	cultivated nut	540 Mb			Chinese Academy of Forestry	2020	
Juglans sigillata (Iron walnut)	Junglandaceae	cultivated nut	536.50 Mb			Nanjing Forestry University	2020	Illumina+Nanopore+bionano scaffold N50: 16.43 Mb, contig N50: 4.34 Mb
Linum usitatissimum (flax)	Linaceae	Crop	489.1 Mb	43,384		BGI et al.	2012	Scaffold N50 of 28.1 Mb (2025 reference)
Bombax ceiba (red silk cotton tree)	Malvaceae	capsules with white fibre like cotton	895 Mb				2018	
Durio zibethinus (Durian)	Malvaceae	Tropical fruit tree	715.2 Mb	44,795			2017	Scaffold N50 of 22.7 Mb
Gossypium raimondii	Malvaceae	One of the putative progenitor species of tetraploid cotton					2013?	
Theobroma cacao (cocoa tree)	Malvaceae	Flavouring crop					2010	
Theobroma cacao (cocoa tree) cv. Matina 1-6	Malvaceae	Most widely cultivated cacao type					2013	
Theobroma cacao (200 accessions)	Malvaceae	domestication history of cacao					2018	
Theobroma grandiflorum (cupuaçu)	Malvaceae	Cacao family tropical fruit	423 Mbp	31,381			2024	
Azadirachta indica (neem)	Meliaceae	Source of terpenoids, such as biopesticide azadirachtin. Used in traditional medicine	281.7 Mb	25,767	14	GANIT Labs	2012 and 2011	Scaffold N50 of 19.5 Mb (2022 reference)
Artocarpus nanchuanensis (Bayberry)	Moraceae	Extremely endangered fruit tree	769.44 Mbp	39,596	28		2022	
Moringa oleifera (Horseradish Tree)	Moringaceae	traditional herbal medicine		18,451			2018	
Eucalyptus caleyi (Caley's ironbark)	Myrtaceae		589.32 Mb				2024	
Eucalyptus urophylla (Timor white gum)	Myrtaceae	Fibre and timber crop	544.5 Mb				2023	
Eucalyptus grandis (Rose gum)	Myrtaceae	Fibre and timber crop	691.43 Mb				2011	
Eucalyptus lansdowneana (crimson mallee)	Myrtaceae		633.52 Mb				2024	
Eucalyptus marginata (jarrah)	Myrtaceae		512.89 Mb				2024	
Eucalyptus pauciflora (Snow gum)	Myrtaceae	Fibre and timber crop	594.87 Mb			ANU	2020	Nanopore + Illumina; contig N50: 3.23 Mb
Melaleuca alternifolia (tea tree)	Myrtaceae	terpene-rich essential oil with therapeutic and cosmetic uses around the world	362 Mb	37,226		Gigabyte, NCBI GenBank, GigaScience	2021	3128 scaffolds with a total length of 362 Mb (N50 = 1.9 Mb)
Melaleuca quinquenervia (broad-leaved paperbark)	Myrtaceae	source of Nerolina oil, medicinal properties (anticancer activity)	262 Mb	57,261	22	GigaScience, Oxford Academic, GigaScience Press	2023	assembled to individual chromosomes (pseudo-phased), N50 = over 22Mb
Averrhoa carambola (Star Fruit)	Oxalidales	fruit crop	335.49 Mb				2020	
Carya cathayensis (Chinese hickory)	Rosaceae	fruit crop	706.43 Mb				2019	
Eriobotrya japonica (Loquat)	Rosaceae	Fruit tree	760.1 Mb	45,743		Shanghai Academy of Agricultural Sciences	2020	Illumina+Nanopore+Hi-C 17 chromosomes, scaffold N50: 39.7 Mb
Fragaria vesca (wild strawberry)	Rosaceae	Fruit crop	240 Mbp	34,809			2011	scaffold N50: 1.3 Mbp 454/Illumina/solid 39x coverage WGS
Gillenia trifoliata (Indian physic, Bowman's root)	Rosaceae	Traditional medicine	300.9 Mb	26,166	18		2021	Scaffold N50 of 32.1 Mb (2025 reference)
Malus domestica (apple)	Rosaceae	Fruit crop	650.8 Mb	51,804			2010	Scaffold N50 of 37.7 Mb (2024 reference)
Prunus amygdalus (almond)	Rosaceae	Fruit crop					2013?	
Prunus avium (sweet cherry) cv. Stella	Rosaceae	Fruit crop					2013?	
Prunus mume (Chinese plum or Japanese apricot)	Rosaceae	Fruit crop					2012	
Prunus persica (peach)	Rosaceae	Fruit crop	227.4 Mb	26,412			2013	Scaffold N50 of 27.4 Mb (2017 reference)
Prunus salicina (Japanese plum)	Rosaceae	Fruit crop	284.2 Mbp	24,448	8		2020	PacBio/Hi-C, with contig N50 of 1.78 Mb and scaffold N50 of 32.32 Mb.
Pyrus bretschneideri (ya pear or Chinese white pear) cv. Dangshansuli	Rosaceae	Fruit crop					2012	
Pyrus communis (European pear) cv. Doyenne du Comice	Rosaceae	Fruit crop					2013?	
Rosa roxburghii (Chestnut Rose)	Rosaceae	Fruit crop	504 Mbp				2023	
Rosa sterilis	Rosaceae	Fruit crop	981.2 Mb				2023	
Rubus occidentalis (Black raspberry)	Rosaceae	Fruit crop	290 Mbp				2018	
Citrus clementina (Clementine)	Rutaceae	Fruit crop					2013?	
Citrus sinensis (Sweet orange)	Rutaceae	Fruit crop					2013?, 2013	
Clausena lansium (Wampee)	Rutaceae	Fruit crop					2021	
Populus trichocarpa (poplar)	Salicaceae	Carbon sequestration, model tree, timber	510 Mbp (cytogenetic) 485 Mbp (coverage)	73,013 [Phytozome]			2006	Scaffold N50: 19.5 Mbp Contig N50:552.8 Kbp [phytozome] WGS >=95 % cDNA found
Populus pruinosa (desert tree)	Salicaceae	farming and ranching	479.3 Mbp	35,131			2017	
Acer truncatum (purpleblow maple)	Sapindaceae	Tree producing nervonic acid	633.28 Mb	28,438			2020	contig N50 = 773.17 Kb; scaffold N50 = 46.36 Mb
Acer yangbiense	Sapindaceae	Endangered tree	664.9 Mb	28,320	13		2019	Scaffold N50 of 44.9 Mb
Dimocarpus longan (Longan)	Sapindaceae	Fruit crop	471.88 Mb				2017	
Xanthoceras sorbifolium Bunge (Yellowhorn)	Sapindaceae	Fruit Crop	504.2 Mb	24,672			2019	
Aquilaria sinensis (Agarwood)	Thymelaeaceae	Fragrant wood	726.5 Mb	29,203			2020	Illumina+nanopore+Hi-C, scaffold N50: 88.78 Mb
Vitis vinifera 'Pinot Noir 40024' (wine grape)	Vitaceae	fruit crop	494.9 Mb	29,591			2007	Scaffold N50 of 26.9 Mb (2023 reference)
Angophora floribunda (Rough-barked apple)	Myrtaceae	Forest tree						
Corymbia maculata (Spotted gum)	Myrtaceae	Used for timber and used in horticulture						
Eucalyptus brandiana (Brand's mallet)	Myrtaceae						2024	
Ormosia purpureiflora (Purple Ormosia)	Fabaceae	Food crop	1.42 to 1.58 Gb	50,517 to 55,061		BGI	2025	
Ormosia emarginata (Emarginate-leaved Ormosia)	Fabaceae	Food crop	1.42 to 1.58 Gb	50,517 to 55,061		BGI	2025	
Ormosia semicastrata (Soft-fruited Ormosia )	Fabaceae	Food crop	1.42 to 1.58 Gb	50,517 to 55,061		BGI	2025	
Bauhinia blakeana (Hong Kong Bauhinia )	Fabaceae	Ornamental plant	290.97 Mb			BGI	2025	
Sesbania cannabina (yellow pea bush)	Fabaceae		2,087 Mb				2023	

===== Asterids =====
Organism strain	Family	Relevance	Genome size	Number of genes predicted	Organization	Year of completion	Assembly status
Asclepias syriaca, (common milkweed)	Apocynaceae	Exudes milky latex	420 Mbp	14,474	Oregon State University	2019	80.4× depth N50 = 3,415 bp
Bidens alba (Beggarticks)	Asteraceae	Invasive weed	Tetraploid (4x): 3.86 Gb; Diploid (2x): 1.93 Gb	4x: 181,196,996 bp; 2x: 90,598,498 bp		2024	Contig N50: 15.05 Mb; Scaffold N50: 75.13 Mb; Sequences anchored to chromosomes: 95%; Telomeres assembled: 57%; BUSCO completeness: 4x: 99%; 2x: 98%
Dahlia pinnata (Garden dahlia)	Asteraceae	Molecular breeding, inulin production, and evolutionary studies	7.96 Gb	181,915		2024	Chromosome-level genome assembly; BUSCO completeness: 99.1%
Cosmos bipinnatus (Garden Cosmos)	Asteraceae	Ornamental flowering plant	1.08 Gb	46,076		2024	GC content: 36.8%; Contig N50: 52.8 Mb; Scaffold N50: 79.4 Mb; Sequences anchored to chromosomes: 93.7%; Telomeres assembled: 58.3%; BUSCO completeness: 97.4%
Erigeron breviscapus (Chinese herbal fleabane)	Asteraceae	Chinese medicine		37,505		2017	
Helianthus annuus (sunflower)	Asteraceae	Oil crop	3.6 Gbb	52,232	INRA and The Sunflower Genome Database	2017	N50 contig: 13.7 kb
Lactuca sativa (lettuce)	Asteraceae	Vegetable crop	2.5 Gbb	38,919		2017	N50 contig: 12 kb; N50 scaffold: 476 kb
Handroanthus impetiginosus (Pink Ipê)	Bignoniaceae	Common tree	503.7 Mb	31,668		2017	
Cornus wilsoniana (ghost dogwood)	Cornales	ornamental tree	843.51 Mb	30,474	Oxford University Press	2023	N50 contig size 4.49 and N50 scaffod size 78.00 Mb
Diospyros oleifera Cheng (Oil persimmon)	Ebenaceae	Fruit tree	849.53 Mb	28,580	Zhejiang University & Chinese Academy of Forestry	2019 & 2020	Two genomes both chromosome scale & assigned to 15 pseudochromosomes
Rhododendron bailiense (Bailie's Rhododendron)	Ericaceae	Alkaline karst landforms	923.3 Mb	47,567		2025	Chromosome-level genome assembly; Contig N50: 24.5 Mb; BUSCO completeness: Not explicitly mentioned, but implied to be high-quality
Rhododendron nivale subsp. boreale (Dwarf Snow Rhododendron)	Ericaceae	Alpine woody flowering plant	2.48 Gb	127,810		2024	Scaffold N50: 42.93 Mb; BUSCO completeness: 98.8%; Quality Value (QV): 45.51; S-AQI: 98.69
Salvia miltiorrhiza (Chinese red sage)	Lamiaceae	TCM treatment for COPD	641 Mb	34,598		2015	
Callicarpa americana (American beautyberry)	Lamiaceae	Ornamental shrub and insect-repellent	506 Mb	32,164	Michigan State University	2020	17 pseudomolecules Contig N50: 7.5Mb Scaffold N50: and 29.0 Mb
Mentha x piperita (Peppermint)	Lamiaceae	Oil crop	353 Mb	35,597	Oregon State University	2017	
Tectona grandis (Teak)	Lamiaceae	Durability and water resistance		31,168		2019	
Utricularia gibba (humped bladderwort)	Lentibulariaceae	model system for studying genome size evolution; a carnivorous plant	81.87 Mb	28,494	LANGEBIO, CINVESTAV	2013	Scaffold N50: 80.839 Kb
Camptotheca acuminata Decne (Chinese happy tree)	Nyssaceae	chemical drugs for cancer treatment	403 Mb	31,825		2017	
Davidia involucrata Baill (Dove tree)	Nyssaceae	Living fossil	1,169 Mb	42,554		2020	
Erythranthe guttata (was Mimulus guttatus)	Phrymaceae	model system for studying ecological and evolutionary genetics	321.6 Mb	29,720	JGI	2013?	Scaffold N50 of 1.1 Mb
Primula vulgaris (Common primrose)	Primulaceae	Used for cooking	474 Mb			2018	
Cinchona pubescens Vahl. (Fever tree)	Rubiaceae	Anti-malarial	1.1 Gb			2022	
Solanum lycopersicum (tomato) cv. Heinz 1706	Solanaceae	Food crop	832.8 Mb	41,476	SGN	2011 2012	Scaffold N50 of 69.6 Mb (2024 reference)
Solanum aethiopicum (Ethiopian eggplant)	Solanaceae	Food crop	1.02 Gbp	34,906	BGI	2019	Illumina scaffold N50: 516,100bp contig N50: 25,200 bp ~109× coverage
Solanum pimpinellifolium (Currant Tomato)	Solanaceae	closest wild relative to tomato				2012	Illumina contig N50: 5100bp ~40x coverage
Solanum tuberosum (Potato)	Solanaceae	Food crop	726 Mbp	39,031	Potato Genome Sequencing Consortium (PGSC)	2011	Sanger/454/Illumina 79.2x coverage contig N50: 31,429bp scaffold N50: 1,318,511bp
Solanum commersonii (commerson's nightshade)	Solanaceae	Wild potato relative	838 Mbp kmer (840 Mbp)	37,662	UNINA, UMN, UNIVR, Sequentia Biotech, CGR	2015	Illumina 105x coverage contig N50: 6,506bp scaffold N50: 44,298bp
Cuscuta campestris (field dodder)	Solanaceae	model system for parasitic plants	556 Mbp kmer (581 Mbp)	44,303	RWTH Aachen University, Research Center Jülich, University of Tromsø, Helmholtz Zentrum München, Technical University of Munich, University of Vienna	2018	scaffold N50 = 1.38 Mbp
Cuscuta australis (Southern dodder)	Solanaceae	model system for parasitic plants	265 Mbp kmer (273 Mbp)	19,671	Kunming Institute of Botany, Chinese Academy of Sciences	2018	scaffold N50 = 5.95 Mbp contig N50 = 3.63 Mbp
Nicotiana benthamiana	Solanaceae	Model organism	2762 Mb	46,215		2012	Scaffold N50 of 142.6 Mb (2023 reference)
Nicotiana sylvestris (Wood tobacco)	Solanaceae	model system for studies of terpenoid production	2321.6 Mb	54,111	Philip Morris International	2013	Scaffold N50 of 188.6 Mb (2023 reference)
Nicotiana tomentosiformis	Solanaceae	Tobacco progenitor	1741.8 Mb	53,826	Philip Morris International	2013	Scaffold N50 of 139 Mb (2023 reference)
Capsicum annuum (Pepper) (a) cv. CM334 (b) cv. Zunla-1	Solanaceae	Food crop	~3.48 Gbp	(a) 34,903 (b) 35,336		(a) 2014 (b) 2014	N50 contig: (a) 30.0 kb (b) 55.4 kb N50 scaffold: (a) 2.47 Mb (b) 1.23 Mb
Capsicum annuum var. glabriusculum (Chiltepin)	Solanaceae	Progenitor of cultivated pepper	~3.48 Gbp	34,476		2014	N50 contig: 52.2 kb N50 scaffold: 0.45 Mb
Petunia hybrida	Solanaceae	Economically important flower				2011	
Camellia oleifera (Oil-seed camellia)	Theaceae	First chromosome-level genome, edible oil production	2.73 Gb	40,812		2022	scaffold N50 of 185.30 Mb
Camellia chekiangoleosa (Oil-tea camellia)	Theaceae	Hereditary improvement & germplasm utilization	2.73 Gb	64,608	15	2022	scaffold N50 of 185.30 Mb; repetitive sequences: 2:16 Gb of the genome
Peucedanum praeruptorum (Qianhu)	Apiaceae	Traditional Chinese Medicine. Produces coumarins.	1.798 Gb	44,468	11	2024	Telomere-to-telomere (T2T) genome assembly; Contig N50: 161 Mb; BUSCO completeness: 98.2% (assembly), 97.3% (annotation)
Camellia granthamiana (Grantham's camellia)	Theaceae	Ornamental plant	2.4 Gb	68,032	Hong Kong Biodiversity Genetics Consortium	2024	The genome has high contiguity, with a scaffold N50 of 139.7 Mb, and high completeness (97.8% BUSCO score)

==== Monocots ====
===== Grasses =====
Organism strain	Family	Relevance	Genome size	Number of genes predicted	Organization	Year of completion	Assembly status
Setaria italica (Foxtail millet)	Poaceae	Model of C4 metabolism	400 Mb (approx)			2012	
Aegilops tauschii (Tausch's goatgrass)	Poaceae	bread wheat D-genome progenitor	4,360 Mb (approx)	39,622		2017	pseudomolecule assembly
Aegilops ventricosa Swollen Goatgrass	Poaceae		8.67 Gb			2025	
Bothriochloa decipiens (Australian bluestem grass)	Poaceae	BCD clade and polyploid	1,218.22 Mb	60,652		2023	Scaffold N50: 42.637 Mb
Brachypodium distachyon (purple false brome)	Poaceae	Model monocot	272 Mb			2010	
Coix lacryma-jobi L. (Job's tears)	Poaceae	Crop & used in medicine & ornamentation	1,619 Mb	39,629		2019	
Dichanthelium oligosanthes (Heller's rosette grass)	Poaceae	C3 grass closely related to C4 species	960 Mb		DDPSC	2016	
Digitaria exilis (white fonio)	Poaceae	African orphan crop	761 Mb		ICRISAT, UC Davis	2021	3,329 contigs. N50: 1.73 Mb; L50, 126)
Eragrostis curvula	Poaceae	Forage & erosion control	602 Mb	56,469		2019	
Hordeum vulgare (barley)	Poaceae	Crop & model of ecological adoption	5,100 Mb		IBSC	2012, 2017	
Lolium perenne (perennial ryegrass)	Poaceae	Forage grass for pasture and hay	2.5 Gb	38,765	Gigabyte	2024	contig N50: 120Mb
Olyra latifolia (carrycillo)	Poaceae	Soil stabilization, crafting material and natural landscaping	~625.9 Mb	~29,343	Nature Genetics	2024	Chromosome-level, using Hi-C Contig N50: 17.5Mb
Raddia guianensis	Poaceae	Small-sized, in understory habitats, herbaceous bamboo	~625.9 Mb	~29,343	Nature Genetics	2024	Chromosome-level, using Hi-C Contig N50: 17.5Mb
Raddia distichophylla	Poaceae	Native to Brazil, wet tropical biomes	~580.85 Mb	~30,763	Genetics Society of America, Oxford Academic	draft 2021	contig N50 ~86.36 kb, scaffold N50 ~1.81 Mb
Ampelocalamus luodiadenensis	Poaceae	Native to China, ornamental	~1,628.3 Mb	~47,444	Nature Genetics	2024	Chromosome-level, using Hi-C Contig N50: 17.5Mb
Hsuehochloa calcarea	Poaceae	Rare and endemic, contribute to conservation	~1,628.3 Mb	~47,444	Nature Genetics	2024	Chromosome-level, using Hi-C Contig N50: 17.5Mb
Phyllostachys edulis (Moso bamboo)	Poaceae	Vital economically, construction, textiles and food	~1,628.3 Mb	~47,444	Nature Genetics	2024	Chromosome-level, using Hi-C Contig N50: 17.5Mb
Rhipidocladum racemiflorum	Poaceae	Neotropical species, study bamboo adaptation in tropical forests	~1,628.3 Mb	~47,444	Nature Genetics	2024	Chromosome-level, using Hi-C Contig N50: 17.5Mb
Otatea glauca (Mayan Silver Bamboo)	Poaceae	Native to Mexico, culturally significant	~1,628.3 Mb	~47,444	Nature Genetics	2024	Chromosome-level, using Hi-C Contig N50: 17.5Mb
Guadua angustifolia (Colombian Timber Bamboo)	Poaceae	Major timber bamboo, sustainable construction and carbon sequestration	~1,628.3 Mb	~47,444	Nature Genetics	2024	Chromosome-level, using Hi-C Contig N50: 17.5Mb
Melocanna baccifera (Muli bamboo)	Poaceae	Mass flowering events, ecologically impactful in South Asia	~1,122.4 Mb	~51,989	Nature Genetics	2024	Chromosome-level, using Hi-C Contig N50: 17.5Mb
Bonia amplexicaulis	Poaceae	Polyploid bamboo evolution study	~1,122.4 Mb	~51,989	Nature Genetics	2024	Chromosome-level, using Hi-C Contig N50: 17.5Mb
Dendrocalamus siniscus (Giant Dragon Bamboo)	Poaceae	Largest bamboo species globally	~1,122.4 Mb	~51,989	Nature Genetics	2024	Chromosome-level, using Hi-C Contig N50: 17.5Mb
Oryza brachyantha (wild rice)	Poaceae	Disease resistant wild relative of rice	362 Mb			2013	
Oryza glaberrima (African rice) var CG14	Poaceae	West-African species of rice	358 Mb			2010	
Oryza longistaminata Perennial wild rice	Poaceae	Wild relative of cultivated rice used for research purposes	357 Mb	33,177		2025	contig N50 of 26.02 Mb
Oryza rufipogon (red rice)	Poaceae	Ancestor to Oryza sativa	406 Mb	37,071	SIBS	2012	Illumina HiSeq2000 100x coverage
Oryza sativa (long grain rice) ssp indica	Poaceae	Crop and model cereal	430 Mb		International Rice Genome Sequencing Project (IRGSP)	2002	
Oryza sativa (Short grain rice) ssp japonica	Poaceae	Crop and model cereal	430 Mb		International Rice Genome Sequencing Project (IRGSP)	2002	
Panicum virgatum (switchgrass)	Poaceae	biofuel	1,129.9 Mb			2013?	
Poa annua (annual bluegrass)	Poaceae	weed	3,560 Mb	76,420	USDA ARS, Forage and Range Research	2023	unphased (haploid) pseudomolecules
Poa infirma (weak bluegrass)	Poaceae	diploid progenitor to Poa annua	2,250 Mb	39,420	Penn State University	2023	unphased (haploid) pseudomolecules
Poa pratensis (Kentucky bluegrass)	Poaceae	Lawn grass	6,090 Mb			2023	Scaffold N50: 65.1 Mbp
Poa supina (supine bluegrass)	Poaceae	diploid progenitor to Poa annua	1,270 Mb	37,935	Penn State University	2023	unphased (haploid) pseudomolecules
Phyllostachys edulis (moso bamboo)	Poaceae	Bamboo textile industry	603.3 Mb	25,225		2013 2018	
Sorghum bicolor genotype BTx623	Poaceae	Crop	730 Mb (approx)	34,496		2009	contig N50:195.4kbp scaffold N50: 62.4Mbp Sanger, 8.5x coverage WGS
Triticum aestivum (bread wheat)	Poaceae	20% of global nutrition	14,500 Mb	107,891	IWGSC	2018	pseudomolecule assembly
Triticum urartu	Poaceae	Bread wheat A-genome progenitor	4,940 Mb (approx)		BGI	2013	Non-repetitive sequence assembled Illumina WGS
Zea mays (maize) ssp mays B73	Poaceae	Cereal crop	2,300 Mb	39,656		2009	contig N50 40kbp scaffold N50: 76kbp Sanger, 4-6x coverage per BAC
Pennisetum glaucum (pearl millet)	Poaceae	Sub-Saharan and Sahelian millet species	1,790 Mb (approx)	38,579		2017	WGS and bacterial artificial chromosome (BAC) sequencing

===== Other non-grasses =====
Organism strain	Family	Relevance	Genome size	Number of genes predicted	No of chromosomes	Organization	Year of completion	Assembly status
Ananas bracteatus accession CB5	Bromeliaceae	Wild pineapple relative	382 Mb	27,024	25		2015	100× coverage using Illumina paired-end reads of libraries with different insert sizes.
Ananas comosus (L.) Merr. (Pineapple), varieties F153 and MD2	Bromeliaceae	The most economically valuable crop possessing crassulacean acid metabolism (CAM)	382 Mb	27,024	25		2015	400× Illumina reads, 2× Moleculo synthetic long reads, 1× 454 reads, 5× PacBio single-molecule long reads and 9,400 BACs.
Ottelia alismoides (Duck lettuce)	Hydrocharitaceae	Aquatic plant	6450 Mb				2024	11,923 scaffolds/contigs and an N50 of 790,733 bp
Pontederia crassipes (Water hyacinth)	Pontederiaceae	Aquatic plant	1220 Mb		8	65,299	2024	Scaffold N50 = 77.2Mb
Musa acuminata (Banana)	Musaceae	A-genome of modern banana cultivars	523 Mb	36,542			2012	N50 contig: 43.1 kb N50 scaffold: 1.3 Mb
Musa balbisiana (Wild banana) (PKW)	Musaceae	B-genome of modern banana cultivars	438 Mb	36,638			2013	N50 contig: 7.9 kb
Musa balbisiana (DH-PKW)	Musaceae	B-genome (B-subgenome to cultivated allotriploid bananas)	430 Mb	35,148	11	CATAS, BGI, CIRAD	2019	N50 contig: 1.83 Mb
Musa beccarii (Red ornamental banana)	Musaceae	Ornamental, aids understanding Musaceae genomes evolution	567 Mb	39,112	9		2023	
[[]Calamus simplicifolius]]	Arecaceae	native to tropical and subtropical regions	1980 Mb	51,235			2018	
Cocos nucifera (Coconut palm)	Arecaceae	used in food and cosmetics	2420 Mb (approx)				2017	
Daemonorops jenkinsiana	Arecaceae	native to tropical and subtropical regions.	1610 Mb	52,342			2018	
Phoenix dactylifera (Date palm)	Arecaceae	Woody crop in arid regions	658 Mbp	28,800			2011	N50 contig: 6.4 kb
Elaeis guineensis (African oil palm)	Arecaceae	Oil-bearing crop	1800 Mb (approx)	34,800			2013	N50 scaffold: 1.27 Mb
Spirodela polyrhiza (Greater duckweed)	Araceae	Aquatic plant	158 Mbp	19,623			2014	N50 scaffold: 3.76 Mb
Ophrys sphegodes (The Early Spider-Orchid)	Orchidaceae	Known for sexual deception (specific-specific pollination)	5.2 Gb	42,549			2024	Scaffold-level details (e.g., N50, BUSCO) are not provided in the abstract
Dendrobium hybrid cultivar 'Emma White'	Orchidaceae	Commercialised hybrid orchid	678 Mbp				2022	
Phalaenopsis equestris (Schauer) Rchb.f. (Moth orchid)	Orchidaceae	Breeding parent of many modern moth orchid cultivars and hybrids. Plant with crassulacean acid metabolism (CAM).	1600 Mb	29,431			2014	N50 scaffold: 359,115 kb
Iris pallida Lam. (Dalmatian Iris)	Iridaceae	Ornamental and, commercial interest in secondary metabolites	10040 Mb	63,944		Novartis	2023	Scaffold N50: 14.34 Mbp
Iris sibirica (Siberian Iris)	Iridaceae	Ornamental flower	226.6 Mb				2023	
Iris virginica (Southern Blue Flag Iris)	Iridaceae	Ornamental flower	390.9 Mb				2023	
Acorus gramineus (Japanese sweet flag)	Acoraceae	Insight into the evolution of monocots	399.8 Mb	23,207			2023	Gap-free; 12 pseudochromosomes; Scaffold N50: 36.5 Mb; BUSCO score: 96.7% completeness

== Press releases announcing sequencing ==
Not meeting criteria of the first paragraph of this article in being nearly full sequences with high quality, published, assembled and publicly available. This list includes species where sequences are announced in press releases or websites, but not in a data-rich publication in a refereed peer-review journal with DOI.

- Corchorus olitorius (Jute mallow), fibre plant 2017
- Corchorus capsularis 2017
- Fraxinus excelsior, European ash (2013 draft)

== See also ==
- Lists of sequenced genomes
- List of sequenced bacterial genomes
- List of sequenced archaeal genomes
- List of sequenced eukaryotic genomes
- Lists of sequenced mitochondrial genomes
- List of sequenced plastomes
- List of sequenced animal genomes
- List of sequenced animal mitochondrial genomes
- List of sequenced fungi genomes
- List of sequenced fungi mitochondrial genomes
- List of sequenced plant mitochondrial genomes
- List of sequenced protist genomes
