= List of sequenced plastomes =

List of plastid genomes whose DNA sequence is known

The 156 kb plastome gene map of Nicotiana tabacum

The 154 kb plastid genome map of a model flowering plant (Arabidopsis thaliana: Brassicaceae)

The highly reduced, 27 kb plastome map of the parasitic Hydnora visseri

A plastome is the genome of a plastid, a type of organelle found in plants and in a variety of protists. The number of known plastid genome sequences grew rapidly in the first decade of the twenty-first century. For example, 25 chloroplast genomes were sequenced for one molecular phylogenetic study.

The flowering plants are especially well represented in complete chloroplast genomes. As of January, 2017, all of their orders are represented except Commelinales, Picramniales, Huerteales, Escalloniales, Bruniales, and Paracryphiales.

A compilation of most complete plastid genomes is maintained by the NCBI in a public repository.

== Plants ==
=== Bryophytes s.l. ===
Sequenced plastomes
Species	Variety	Size (bp)	Genes	Reference	Notes
Aneura mirabilis		108,007			parasitic liverwort; plastome contains many pseudogenes
Anthoceros formosae		161,162	122		hornwort; extensive RNA editing of plastome
Marchantia polymorpha		121,024			liverwort
Nothoceros aenigmaticus		153,208	124		hornwort
Pellia endiviifolia		120,546	123		liverwort
Physcomitrella patens		122,890	118		moss
Ptilidium pulcherrimum		119,007	122		liverwort
Tortula ruralis		122,630			moss

=== Ferns and lycophytes ===
Sequenced plastomes
Species	Variety	Size (bp)	Genes	Reference	Family	Notes
Adiantum capillus-veneris		150,568			Pteridaceae	
Alsophila spinulosa		156,661	117		Cyatheaceae	
Angiopteris evecta		153,901			Marattiaceae	
Equisetum arvense		133,309			Equisetaceae	
Huperzia lucidula		154,373			Lycopodiaceae	
Isoetes flaccida		145,303			Isoetaceae	
Psilotum nudum		138,829	117		Psilotaceae	
Selaginella uncinata		138,829			Selaginellaceae	

Sequenced fern and lycophyte plastomes without information about size, number of genes and/or references
Species	Variety	Size (bp)	Genes	Reference	Family	Notes
Equisetum hyemale					Equisetaceae	
Lygodium japonicum					Lygodiaceae	
Marsilea crenata					Marsileaceae	
Ophioglossum californicum					Ophioglossaceae	
Selaginella moellendorffii					Selaginellaceae	

=== Gymnosperms ===
Sequenced plastomes
Species	Variety	Size (bp)	Genes	Reference	Family	Notes
Cryptomeria japonica		131,810	114		Cupressaceae	
Cycas micronesica					Cycadaceae	
Cycas taitungensis		163,403	133		Cycadaceae	
Ephedra equisetina					Ephedraceae	
Ginkgo biloba		156,945	134		Ginkgoaceae	
Gnetum parvifolium					Gnetaceae	
Picea engelmannii	Se404-851	123,542	114		Pinaceae	
Picea glauca	PG29	123,266	114		Pinaceae	
Picea glauca	WS77111	123,421	114		Pinaceae	
Picea sitchensis	Q903	124,049	114		Pinaceae	
Pinus koraiensis		116,866			Pinaceae	
Pinus thunbergii		119,707			Pinaceae	
Podocarpus macrophyllus					Podocarpaceae	
Welwitschia mirabilis		119,726	101		Welwitschiaceae	

=== Flowering plants ===
This sortable table is expected to compile complete plastid genomes representing the largest range of sizes, number of genes, and angiosperm families.

Sequenced plastomes with complete genome size, number of unique genes, reference and publication year.
Species	Size (bp)	Genes	Reference	Year	Family	Notes
Acorus americanus	153,819			2007	Acoraceae	
Agrostis stolonifera	135,584	110		2010	Poaceae	
Alniphyllum eberhardtii	155,384	113		2017	Styracaceae	
Alstroemeria aurea	155,510	112		2013	Alstroemeriaceae	
Amborella trichopoda	162,686			2003	Amborellaceae	
Anethum graveolens	153,356			2007	Apiaceae	
Arabidopsis thaliana	154,478			1999	Brassicaceae	
Atropa belladonna	156,687			2002	Solanaceae	
Brachypodium distachyon	135,199	110		2010	Poaceae	
Buxus microphylla	159,010	113		2007	Buxaceae	
Calycanthus floridus var. glaucus	153,337	115		2003	Calycanthaceae	
Carpinus tientaiensis	160,104	114		2017	Betulaceae	
Chloranthus spicatus	157,772	113		2007	Chloranthaceae	
Citrus sinensis var. 'Ridge Pineapple'	155,189			2006	Rutaceae	
Cocos nucifera	154,731	130		2013	Arecaceae	
Coffea arabica	155,189			2007	Rubiaceae	
Coix lacryma-jobi	140,745			2009	Poaceae	
Conopholis americana	45,673	42		2013	Orobanchaceae	Non-photosynthetic parasite
Cucumis sativus	155,293			2007	Cucurbitaceae	
Cuscuta exaltata	125,373			2007	Convolvulaceae	
Cuscuta gronovii	86,744	86		2007	Convolvulaceae	
Cuscuta reflexa	121,521	98		2007	Convolvulaceae	
Cypripedium formosanum	178,131			2015	Orchidaceae	
Cytinus hypocistis	19,400	23		2016	Cytinaceae	Holoparasitic
Daucus carota	155,911			2006	Apiaceae	
Dioscorea elephantipes	152,609	112		2007	Dioscoreaceae	
Drimys granadensis	160,604	113		2006	Winteraceae	
Epifagus virginiana	70,028	42		1992	Orobanchaceae	
Epipogium aphyllum	30,650	27		2015	Orchidaceae	Mycoheterotrophic
Epipogium roseum	19,047	29		2015	Orchidaceae	Mycoheterotrophic
Erodium carvifolium	116,935	107		2016	Geraniaceae	
Erodium chrysanthum	168,946	96		2016	Geraniaceae	
Erodium texanum	130,812	106		2011	Geraniaceae	
Eucalyptus globulus subsp. globulus	160,286			2005	Myrtaceae	
Fagopyrum esculentum ssp. ancestrale	159,599			2008	Polygonaceae	
Geranium palmatum	155,794	105		2011	Geraniaceae	
Glycine max	152,218			2005	Fabaceae	
Gossypium barbadense	160,317	114		2006	Malvaceae	
Gossypium hirsutum	160,301			2006	Malvaceae	
Helianthus annuus	151,104			2007	Asteraceae	
Hordeum vulgare subsp. vulgare	136,482	110		2010	Poaceae	
Hydnora visseri	27,233	24		2016	Aristolochiaceae	Non-photosynthetic holoparasite
Illicium oligandrum	148,552	113		2007	Schisandraceae (sensu APG III)	
Ipomoea purpurea	162,046			2007	Convolvulaceae	
Jasminum nudiflorum	165,121			2007	Oleaceae	
Juglans regia	160,367	129		2017	Juglandaceae	
Lactuca sativa	152,765			2007	Asteraceae	
Lemna minor	165,955			2008	Araliaceae	
Licania alba	162,467	112		2014	Chrysobalanaceae	
Lilium longiflorum	152,793	114		2013	Liliaceae	
Liriodendron tulipifera	159,866			2006	Magnoliaceae	
Lolium perenne	135,282	110		2010	Poaceae	
Lonicera japonica	155,078			2010	Caprifoliaceae	
Lotus japonicus	150,519			2000	Fabaceae	
Manihot esculenta	161,453			2008	Euphorbiaceae	
Monotropa hypopitys	35,336	45		2016	Ericaceae	Mycoheterotrophic
Monsonia speciosa	128,787	106		2011	Geraniaceae	
Morus indica	156,599			2006	Moraceae	
Musa balbisiana	169,503	113		2016	Musaceae	
Nandina domestica	156,599			2006	Berberidaceae	
Neottia nidus-avis	92,060	56		2011	Orchidaceae	Mycoheterotrophic
Nelumbo nucifera	163,330			2010	Nelumbonaceae	
Nicotiana tabacum	155,943	113		1986	Solanaceae	
Nuphar advena	160,866	117		2007	Nymphaeaceae	
Nymphaea alba	159,930			2004	Nymphaeaceae	
Oenothera argillicola strain Douthat 1	165,055	113		2008	Onagraceae	
Oenothera biennis strain suaveolens Grado	164,807	113		2008	Onagraceae	
Oenothera elata subsp. hookeri strain johansen Standard	165,728	113		2008	Onagraceae	
Oenothera glazioviana strain r/r-lamarckiana Sweden	165,225	113		2008	Onagraceae	
Oenothera parviflora strain atrovirens Standard	163,365	113		2008	Onagraceae	
Oryza sativa indica 93–11	134,496			2005	Poaceae	
Oryza sativa japonica Nipponbare	134,551	110		1989	Poaceae	
Oryza sativa japonica PA64S	134,551			2005	Poaceae	
Osyris alba	147,253	101		2015	Santalaceae	Hemiparasitic
Panax ginseng	156,318			2004	Araliaceae	
Pelargonium × hortorum	217,942			2006	Geraniaceae	
Petrosavia stellaris	103,835	58		2014	Petrosaviaceae	Mycoheterotrophic
Phalaenopsis aphrodite subsp. formosana	148,964			2006	Orchidaceae	
Phaseolus vulgaris 'Negro Jamapa'	150,285			2007	Fabaceae	
Pilostyles aethiopica	11,348	5		2016	Apodanthaceae	Endo-holoparasite
Pilostyles hamiltonii	15,167	5		2016	Apodanthaceae	Endo-holoparasite
Piper cenocladum	160,624	113		2006	Piperaceae	
Platanus occidentalis	161,791			2006	Platanaceae	
Populus alba	156,505			2006	Salicaceae	
Ranunculus macranthus	155,158	117		2007	Ranunculaceae	
Rhizanthella gardneri	59,190	33		2011	Orchidaceae	Subterranean mycoheterotroph
Saccharum officinarum	141,182	110		2010	Poaceae	
Sciaphila densiflora	21,485	28		2015	Triuridaceae	Mycoheterotrophic
Solanum tuberosum	155,298			2006	Solanaceae	
Sorghum bicolor	140,754	110		2010	Poaceae	
Spinacia oleracea	150,725			2001	Amaranthaceae	
Trachelium caeruleum	162,321			2008	Campanulaceae	
Trifolium subterraneum	144,763	111		2008	Fabaceae	
Triticum aestivum cv. Chinese Spring	134,545	110		2000	Poaceae	
Typha latifolia	165,572	113		2010	Typhaceae	
Vaccinium macrocarpon	176,045	147		2013	Ericaceae	
Viscum album	128,921	96		2015	Viscaceae	Hemiparasitic
Viscum minimum	131,016	99		2015	Viscaceae	Hemiparasitic
Vitis vinifera	160,928			2006	Vitaceae	
Yucca schidigera	156,158			2005	Asparagaceae (sensu APG III)	
Zea mays	140,384	110		2010	Poaceae	

Sequenced plastomes without information about size, number of genes and / or references.
Species	Size (bp)	Genes	Reference	Year	Family	Notes
Acorus calamus	153,821				Acoraceae	
Aethionema cordifolium					Brassicaceae	
Aethionema grandiflorum					Brassicaceae	
Antirrhinum majus				2010	Plantaginaceae	
Arabis hirsuta					Brassicaceae	
Aucuba japonica				2010	Garryaceae	
Bambusa oldhamii	139,350				Poaceae	
Barbarea verna					Brassicaceae	
Berberidopsis corallina				2010	Berberidopsidaceae	
Brassica rapa					Brassicaceae	
Bulnesia arborea				2010	Zygophyllaceae	
Capsella bursa-pastoris					Brassicaceae	
Carica papaya					Caricaceae	
Ceratophyllum demersum				2007	Ceratophyllaceae	
Cornus florida				2010	Cornaceae	
Crucihimalya wallichii					Brassicaceae	
Cuscuta obtusiflora					Convolvulaceae	
Cuscuta reflexa					Convolvulaceae	
Dendrocalamus latiflorus	139,365				Poaceae	
Dillenia indica				2010	Dilleniaceae	
Draba nemorosa					Brassicaceae	
Ehretia acuminata				2010	Boraginaceae	
Elaeis oleifera				2007	Arecaceae	
Euonymus americanus				2010	Celastraceae	
Festuca arundinacea					Poaceae	
Ficus sp.				2010	Moraceae	
Guizotia abyssinica					Asteraceae	
Gunnera manicata				2010	Gunneraceae	
Hedyosmum			unpublished		Chloranthaceae	
Heuchera sanguinea				2010	Saxifragaceae	
Ilex cornuta				2010	Aquifoliaceae	
Lepidium virginicum					Brassicaceae	
Liquidambar styraciflua (syn. Altingia styraciflua)				2010	Altingiaceae	
Lobularia maritima					Brassicaceae	
Lotus corniculatus					Fabaceae	
Medicago truncatulata	124,033				Fabaceae	
Megaleranthis saniculifolia	159,924				Ranunculaceae	
Meliosma cuneifolia				2010	Sabiaceae	
Nasturtium officinale					Brassicaceae	
Olimarabidopsis pumila					Brassicaceae	
Phoenix dactylifera					Arecaceae	
Nerium oleander	154,903				Apocynaceae	
Nicotiana sylvestris	155,941				Solanaceae	
Nicotiana tomentosiformis	155,745				Solanaceae	
Oryza nivara	134,494				Poaceae	
Oxalis latifolia				2010	Oxalidaceae	
Passiflora biflora				2007	Passifloraceae	
Phoradendron leucarpum				2010	Viscaceae	
Plumbago auriculata				2010	Plumbaginaceae	
Populus trichocarpa				2006	Salicaceae	
Quercus nigra				2010	Fagaceae	
Rhododendron simsii				2010	Ericaceae	
Scaevola aemula				2007	Goodeniaceae	
Solanum bulbocastanum	155,371				Solanaceae	
Solanum lycopersicum	155,460				Solanaceae	
Staphylea colchica				2010	Staphyleaceae	
Trithuria (syn. Hydatella)			unpublished		Hydatellaceae	
Trochodendron aralioides				2010	Trochodendraceae	
Ximenia americana				2010	Ximeniaceae	

== Green algae ==
Sequenced plastomes
Species	Variety	Size (bp)	Genes	Reference
Bryopsis plumosa		106,859	115	
Chaetosphaeridium globosum		131,183	124	
Chara vulgaris				
Chlamydomonas reinhardtii		203,395	99	
Chlorella vulgaris		150,613	209	
Chlorokybus atmophyticus		201,763	70	
Dunaliella salina	CCAP 19/18	269,044	102	
Emiliania huxleyi		105,309	150	
Helicosporidium		37,454	54	
Leptosira terrestris		195,081	117	
Mesostigma viride		42,424		
Monomastix		114,528	94	
Nephroselmis olivacea		200,799	127	
Oedogonium cardiacum		196,547	103	
Oltmannsiellopsis viridis		151,933	105	
Ostreococcus tauri		71,666	86	
Pseudendoclonium akinetum		195,867	105	
Pycnococcus provasolii		80,211	98	
Pyramimonas parkeae		101,605	110	
Scenedesmus obliquus		161,452	96	
Staurastrum punctulatum				
Stigeoclonium helveticum		223,902	97	
Tydemania expeditionis		105,200	125	
Ulva sp.	UNA00071828	99,983	102	
Volvox carteri		420,650	91	
Zygnema circumcarinatum				

== Red algae ==
Sequenced plastomes
Species	Variety	Size (bp)	Genes	Reference	Year	Taxon	Notes
Ahnfeltia plicata		190,451	205 (coding)		2016	Ahnfeltiales	
Apophlaea sinclairii		182,437	189 (coding)		2016	Hildenbrandiales	
Asparagopsis taxiformis		177,091	203 (coding)		2016		
Bangiopsis subsimplex		204,784	194 (coding)		2016		
Calliarthron tuberculosum		178,981	238		2013		
Ceramium japonicum		171,634	199 (coding)		2016		
Chondrus crispus		180,086	240		2013	Gigartinales	
Cyanidioschyzon merolae	10D	149,987	243		2003		
Cyanidium caldarium	RK1	164,921	230		2000		
Erythrotrichia carnea		210,691	191 (coding)		2016		
Galdieria sulphuraria	074W	167,741	233		2015		
Gelidium elegans		174,748	234		2016		
Gelidium sinicola	UC276620	177,095	232		2019		May be synonymous with G. coulteri
Gelidium vagum		179,853	234		2016		
Gracilaria changii		183,855	231		2018	Gracilariales	
Gracilaria chorda		182,459	201 (coding)		2016	Gracilariales	
Gracilaria salicornia		179,757	235		2014	Gracilariales	
Gracilaria tenuistipitata	var. liui	183,883	238		2004	Gracilariales	
Gracilaria vermiculophylla		180,254	239		unpublished	Gracilariales	
Grateloupia filicina		195,990	265		unpublished		
Grateloupia taiwanensis		191,270	266		2013		
Hildenbrandia rivularis		189,725	184 (coding)		2016		
Hildenbrandia rubra		180,141	190 (coding)		2016		
Kumanoa americana		184,025	234		2018		
Palmaria palmata		192,960	245		2018		
Plocamium cartilagineum		171,392	197 (coding)		2016		
Porphyra pulchra		194,175	251		2016	Bangiales	
Porphyra purpurea		191,028	253		1993	Bangiales	
Porphyra umbilicalis		190,173	250		2017	Bangiales	
Porphyridium purpureum	NIES 2140	217,694	260		2014		
Porphyridium sordidum		259,429	227		2016		
Pyropia fucicola		187,282			2015		Partial genome
Pyropia haitanensis	PH 38	195,597	254		2013		
Pyropia kanakaensis		189,931			2015		Partial genome
Pyropia perforata		189,789	247		2015		
Pyropia yezoensis		191,952	264		2013		
Rhodochaete parvula		221,665	195 (coding)		2016		
Rhodymenia pseudopalmata		194,153	201 (coding)		2016		
Riquetophycus sp.		180,384	202 (coding)		2016		
Schimmelmannia schousboei		181,030	202 (coding)		2016		
Schizymenia dubyi		183,959	204 (coding)		2016		
Sebdenia flabellata		192,140	205 (coding)		2016		
Sporolithon durum		191,464	239		2016		
Thorea hispida		175,193	228		2018		
Vertebrata lanosa		167,158	192		2015		Also assigned to genus Polysiphonia

== Glaucophytes ==
Sequenced plastomes
Species	Variety	Size (bp)	Genes	Reference
Cyanophora paradoxa				

== Meta-algae and apicomplexans ==
Meta-algae are organisms with photosynthetic organelles of secondary or tertiary endosymbiotic origin, and their close non-photosynthetic, plastid-bearing, relatives. Apicomplexans are a secondarily non-photosynthetic group of chromalveoates which retain a reduced plastid organelle.

=== Photosynthetic chromalveolates ===
Dinoflagellate plastid genomes are not organised into a single circular DNA molecule like other plastid genomes, but into an array of mini-circles.

Sequenced plastomes
Species	Variety	Size (bp)	Genes	Reference	Notes
Chromera velia					
Chroomonas mesostigmatica	CCMP1168	139,403	189		
Chroomonas placoidea	CCAP978/8	139,432	186		Contains 3 annotated pseudogenes
Cryptomonas curvata	CNUKR	128,285	182		
Cryptomonas paramecium	CCAP977/2a	77,717	115		
Emiliania huxleyi	CCMP 373	105,309	154		
Guillardia theta		121,524	167		
Heterosigma akashiwo	NIES 293	159,370	198		
Odontella sinensis		119,704	175		
Phaeodactylum tricornutum		117,369	170		
Rhodomonas salina	CCMP1319	135,854	183		
Storeatula sp.	CCMP1868	140,953	187		
Teleaulax amphioxeia	HACCP-CR01	129,772	179		
Thalassiosira pseudonana		128,814	180		

=== Chlorarachniophytes ===
Sequenced plastomes
Species	Variety	Size (bp)	Genes	Reference
Bigelowiella natans		69,166	98	
Gymnochlora stellata	CCMP2053	67,451	97	
Lotharella oceanica	CCMP622	70,997	94	
Lotharella vacuolata	CCMP240	71,557	95	
Partenskyella glossopodia	RCC365	72,620	99	

=== Euglenophytes ===
Sequenced plastomes
Species	Variety	Size (bp)	Genes	Reference
Astasia longa		73.2kb	84	
Euglena gracilis		143.2kb	128	

=== Apicomplexans ===
Sequenced plastomes
Species	Variety	Size (bp)	Genes	Reference
Chromera velia				
Eimeria tenella	Penn State	34.8kb	65	
Plasmodium falciparum		34.7kb	68	
Theileria parva	Mugaga	39.6kb	71	
Toxoplasma gondii	RH	35.0kb	65	

== Nucleomorph genomes ==
In some photosynthetic organisms, that ability was acquired via symbiosis with a unicellular green alga (chlorophyte) or red alga (rhodophyte). In some such cases, not only does the chloroplast of the former unicellular alga retain its own genome, but a remnant of the alga is also retained. When this retains a nucleus and a nuclear genome, it is termed a nucleomorph.

Sequenced nucleomorph genomes
Species	Variety	Size (bp)	Genes	Reference
Amorphochlora amoebiformis		373,958	340	
Bigelowiella natans	CCMP 621	442,036	426 (344 protein coding)	
Chroomonas mesostigmatica	CCMP1168	702,852	581 (505 protein coding)	
Cryptomonas paramecium		487,066	519 (466 protein coding)	
Guillardia theta		672,788	743 (632 protein coding)	
Hemiselmis andersenii		571,872	525 (471 protein coding)	
Lotharella oceanica		612,592	654 (608 protein coding)	
Lotharella vacuolata		431,876	359	

== Cyanelle genomes ==
The unicellular eukaryote Paulinella chromatophora possesses an organelle (the cyanelle) which represents an independent case of the acquisition of photosynthesis by cyanobacterial endosymbiosis. (Note: the term "cyanelle" is also applied to the plastids of glaucophytes.)

Sequenced cyanelle genomes
Species	Variety	Size (bp)	Genes	Reference
Paulinella chromatophora		1.02Mb	867	

== See also ==
- Genome skimming
- Lists of sequenced genomes
- List of sequenced bacterial genomes
- List of sequenced archaeal genomes
- List of sequenced eukaryotic genomes
- List of sequenced mitochondrial genomes
- List of sequenced animal genomes
- List of sequenced animal mitochondrial genomes
- List of sequenced fungi genomes
- List of sequenced fungi mitochondrial genomes
- List of sequenced plant genomes
- List of sequenced plant mitochondrial genomes
- List of sequenced protist genomes
