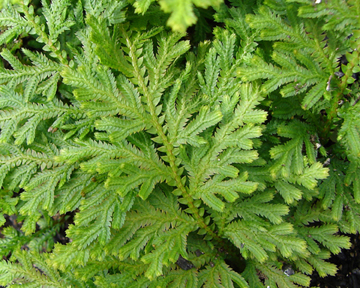

Scientific classification
- Kingdom: Plantae
- Clade: Embryophytes
- Clade: Tracheophytes
- Clade: Lycophytes
- Class: Lycopodiopsida
- Order: Selaginellales
- Family: Selaginellaceae
- Genus: Selaginella
- Species: S. moellendorffii

Binomial name
- Selaginella moellendorffii Hieron.

= Selaginella moellendorffii =

Species of spore-bearing plant

Selaginella moellendorffii is a lycophyte that is an important model organism, especially in comparative genomics. S. moellendorffii is a member of an ancient vascular plant lineage that first appeared in the fossil record some 400 million years ago. They would later form a dominant part of the world's flora during the Carboniferous period. They have a number of unusual and/or "primitive" features, such as rudimentary leaves (microphylls), ubiquitous dichotomous branching, heterospory, and the ligule. As the earliest diverging group of modern vascular plants, they are essential to understanding the evolution of plants as a whole.

== Morphology and anatomy ==
Selaginella moellendorffii exhibits unique morphological features characteristic of lycophytes. The plant possesses microphylls—small leaves with a single unbranched vein—and displays dichotomous branching patterns. Its vascular system comprises protosteles, and roots arise from specialized structures called rhizophores. These features reflect its ancient lineage among vascular plants.

== Genome sequencing ==
The nuclear genome size is approximately 100 mega base pairs, one of the smaller genome sizes found for any plant species. The genome has been sequenced and assembled by the United States Department of Energy's Joint Genome Institute (DOE JGI). Community annotation of the genes and other elements of this genome began in September 2007. Gene content of S. moellendorffii and diverse other taxa have shown that the transition from gametophyte- to sporophyte-dominated life cycle entailed the addition of fewer new genes than the move from nonseed vascular plants (lycophytes) to flowering plants (angiosperms).

Hecht et al., 2011 finds that S. moellendorffii has the highest guanine + cytosine content of any organellar DNA. Its mitochondrial DNA is 68% G+C; both are typically rare components of any organellar DNA.

== Genomic insights ==
S. moellendorffii was the first non-seed vascular plant to have its genome sequenced. The genome is compact, approximately 100 Mbp in size, and contains essential insights into early vascular plant evolution. Comparative studies highlight the limited number of new genes needed for the shift from gametophyte to sporophyte dominance, and further from lycophytes to flowering plants.

== Ecology and distribution ==
Selaginella moellendorffii is native to subtropical Asia and grows in moist, shaded forest floors. It is commonly found in low-elevation broadleaf forests, including those in Taiwan. The species exhibits moderate desiccation tolerance, allowing it to persist in fluctuating environments.

== Evolutionary significance ==
As one of the earliest diverging vascular plant lineages, S. moellendorffii is a valuable model for understanding the evolution of plant form and function. Its genome, morphology, and physiological traits shed light on the transition from non-vascular to vascular systems in land plants.

== Life cycle and reproduction ==
S. moellendorffii is heterosporous, producing distinct megaspores and microspores. This results in the development of separate female and male gametophytes, a feature that distinguishes it from homosporous species. Heterospory is considered a significant evolutionary advancement in the diversification of vascular plant reproductive strategies.
