= Lists of sequenced genomes =

There are several lists of sequenced genomes:

- List of sequenced algae genomes
- List of sequenced animal genomes
- List of sequenced archaeal genomes
- List of sequenced bacterial genomes
- List of sequenced eukaryotic genomes
- List of sequenced fungi genomes
- List of sequenced plant genomes
- List of sequenced plastomes
- List of sequenced protist genomes
