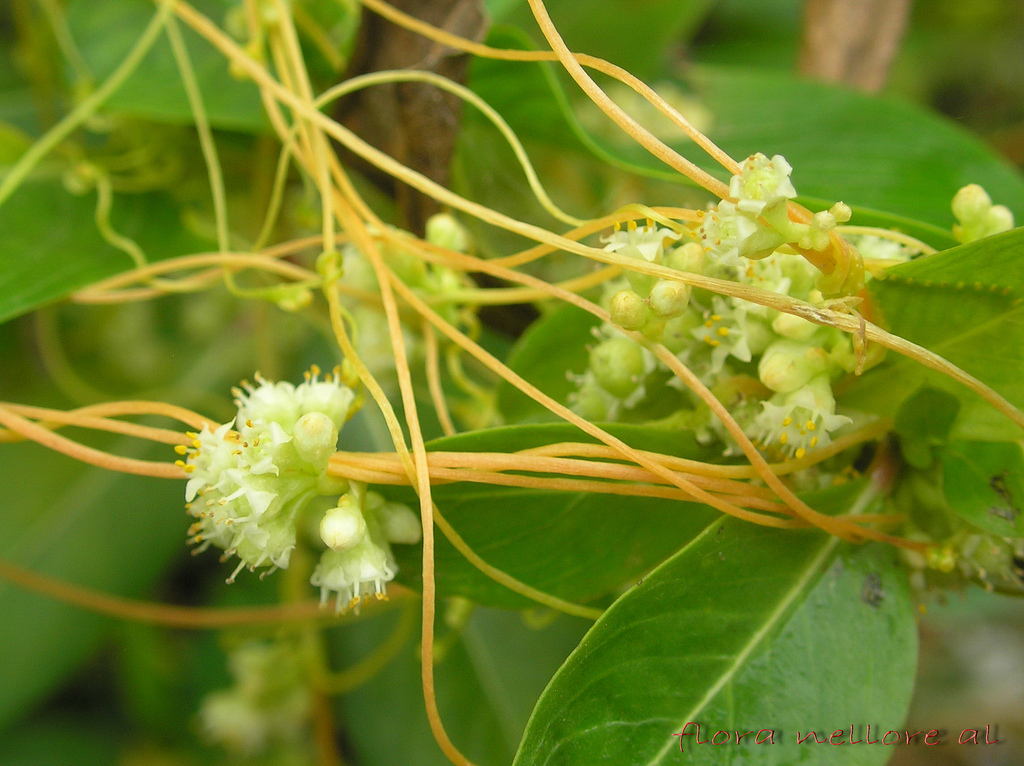

Scientific classification
- Kingdom: Plantae
- Clade: Tracheophytes
- Clade: Angiosperms
- Clade: Eudicots
- Clade: Asterids
- Order: Solanales
- Family: Convolvulaceae
- Genus: Cuscuta
- Species: C. reflexa

Binomial name
- Cuscuta reflexa Roxb.

Varieties
- Cuscuta reflexa var. brachystigma Engelm.; Cuscuta reflexa var. reflexa

Synonyms
- Species: Kadurias reflexa (Roxb.) Raf.; Monogynella reflexa (Roxb.) Holub; var. brachystigma: Cuscuta anguina Edgew.; Cuscuta pentandra B.Heyne ex Engelm.; Cuscuta reflexa var. anguina (Edgew.) C.B.Clarke; var. reflexa: Cuscuta elatior Choisy; Cuscuta grandiflora Wall. ex Choisy, nom. illeg.; Cuscuta hookeri Sweet; Cuscuta macrantha G.Don; Cuscuta megalantha Steud.; Cuscuta reflexa var. grandiflora Engelm.; Cuscuta reflexa var. verrucosa (Sweet) Hook.; Cuscuta verrucosa Sweet

= Cuscuta reflexa =

Species of flowering plant

Cuscuta reflexa, the giant dodder or ulan ulan, is one of about 220 species in genus Cuscuta, in the family Convolvulaceae. It is common in the Indian subcontinent and the Greater Himalayas and as far south as Malaysia and Indonesia. This parasitic plant species is a leafless twined sprawling thin vine that grows over a host plant, including large trees. It will make garlands hanging down from tree canopies as long as 10 metres (33 ft). The flowers are small, bell shaped and white with yellow filaments.

== Gallery ==
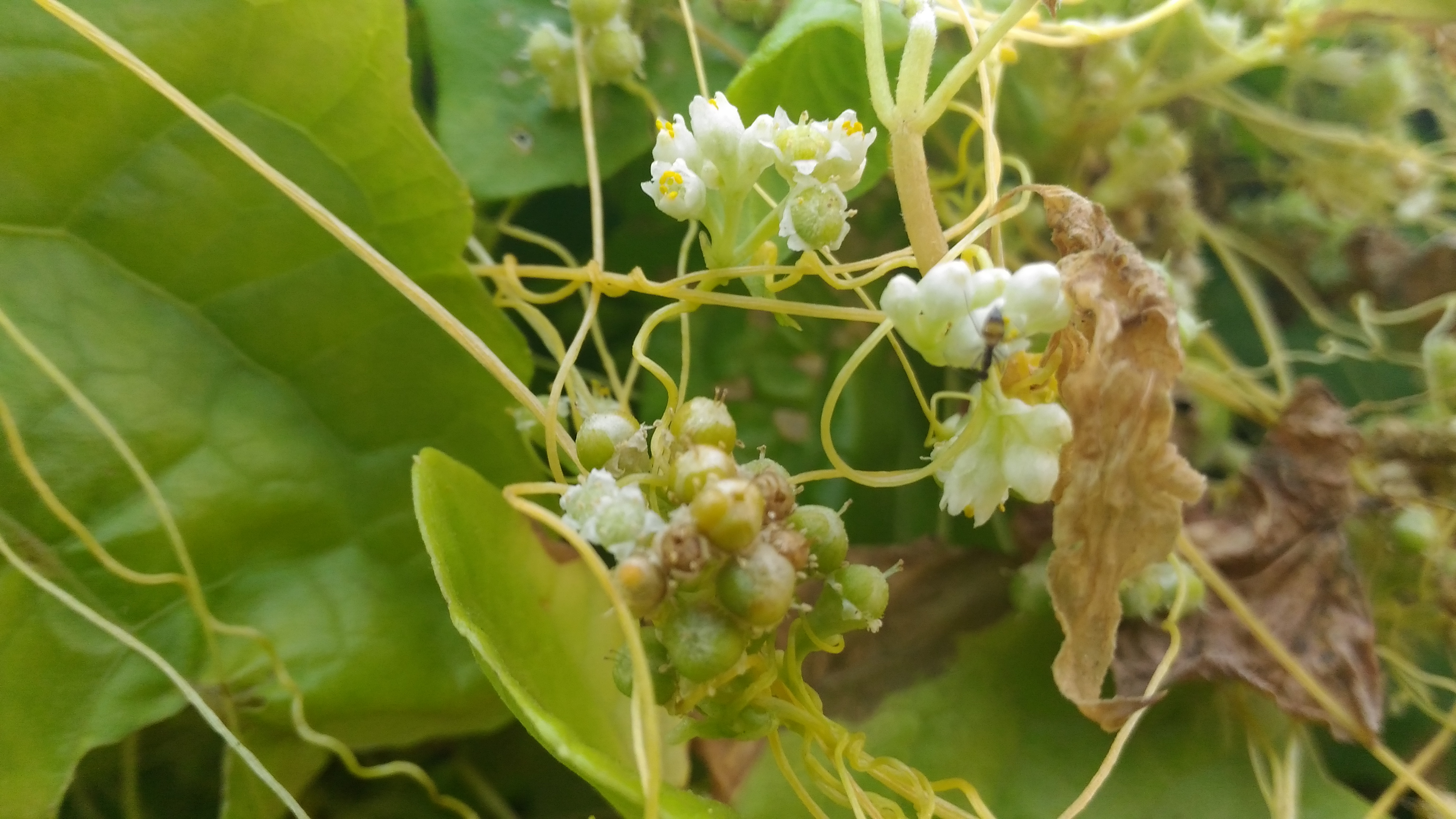
Cuscuta reflexa flowers
