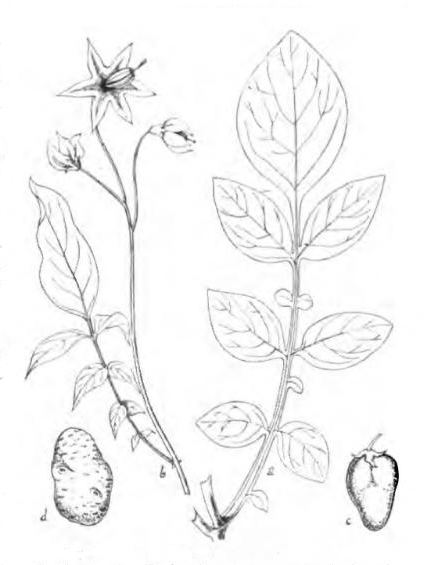
- Botanical illustration

Scientific classification
- Kingdom: Plantae
- Clade: Tracheophytes
- Clade: Angiosperms
- Clade: Eudicots
- Clade: Asterids
- Order: Solanales
- Family: Solanaceae
- Genus: Solanum
- Species: S. commersonii

Binomial name
- Solanum commersonii Poir.

Synonyms
- List: Solanum acroleucum Bitter; Solanum commersonii var. depauperatum Bitter; Solanum commersonii var. ellipticans Bitter; Solanum commersonii var. glabratum Hook.f.; Solanum commersonii var. indigoticascens Bitter; Solanum commersonii f. mechonguense (Bukasov) Correll; Solanum commersonii var. pubescens Sendtn.; Solanum commersonii pubescens Chodat; Solanum commersonii var. raphanistrum Bitter; Solanum commersonii var. rosulans Bitter; Solanum commersonii var. violaceum Herter; Solanum debile Dunal; Solanum henryi Bukasov & Lechn.; Solanum henryi f. laticalix Lechn.; Solanum henryi f. pubescens Lechn.; Solanum mechonguense Bukasov; Solanum mercedense Bukasov; Solanum nicaraguense Rydb.; Solanum ohrondii Carrière; Solanum rionegrinum Lechn.; Solanum sorianum Bukasov; Solanum tenue Sendtn.; Solanum tenue var. pubescens Sendtn. ex Dunal; Solanum tenue var. raphanifolium Dunal

= Solanum commersonii =

Species of flowering plant

Solanum commersonii is a species of wild potato in the family Solanaceae. It is native to southern Brazil, Uruguay, and northeastern Argentina, and has been introduced to Mauritius. It is a crop wild relative useful in potato breeding for its resistance to root knot nematode, soft rot, blackleg, bacterial wilt (Ralstonia solanacearum), verticillium wilt, Potato virus X, tobacco etch virus, common scab, and late blight (caused by Phytophthora infestans), and for its frost tolerance and ability to cold acclimate.

== Genome ==
Aversano et al., 2015 provides a genome sequence.
