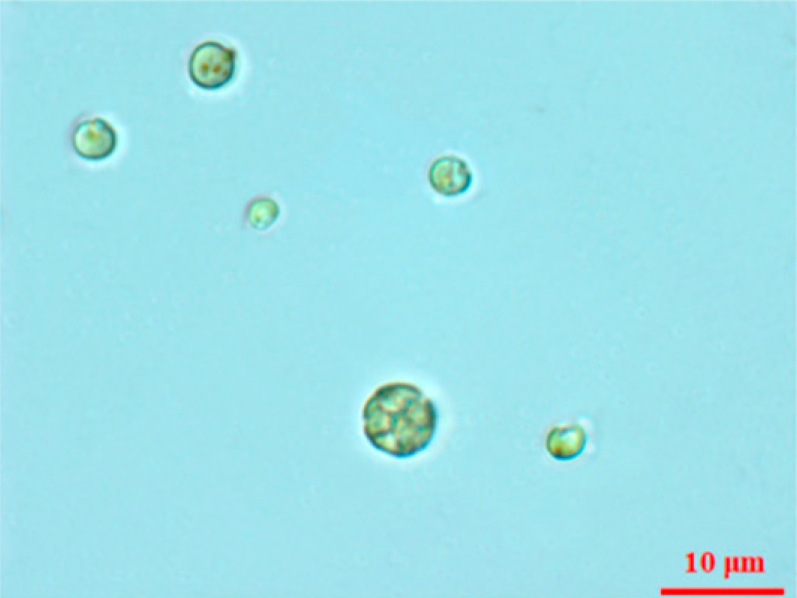

Scientific classification
- Kingdom: Plantae
- Division: Chlorophyta
- Class: Trebouxiophyceae
- Order: Chlorellales
- Family: Chlorellaceae
- Genus: Auxenochlorella
- Species: A. protothecoides

Binomial name
- Auxenochlorella protothecoides (Krüger) Kalina & Puncochárová 1987

= Auxenochlorella protothecoides =

Species of algae

Auxenochlorella protothecoides, formerly known as Chlorella protothecoides, is a facultatively heterotrophic green alga in the family Chlorellaceae. It is known for its potential application in biofuel production. It was first characterized as a distinct algal species in 1965, and has since been regarded as a separate genus from Chlorella due its need for thiamine (not to be confused with thymine) for growth. Auxenochlorella species have been found in a wide variety of environments from acidic volcanic soil in Italy to the sap of poplar trees in the forests of Germany. Its use in industrial processes has been studied, as the high lipid content of the alga during heterotrophic growth is promising for biodiesel; its use in wastewater treatment has been investigated, as well.

== Description ==
Auxenochlorella protothecoides consists of single, globose cells 1.5–9 (typically 3–6.5) μm in diameter, without surrounding mucilage. The cell wall appears smooth in light microscopy; in electron microscopy the cell wall may be nearly smooth or with a network of fine ribs. The cell wall has an inner polysaccharide layer and an outer trilaminar (TL) layer. Vegetative cells are uninucleate (with one nucleus). The single chloroplast is pale green, parietal, and saucer-, cup- or dumbbell-shaped. Reproduction occurs by the formation of two to eight (rarely 16) autospores which are released via the rupture of the parental cell wall.

Auxenochlorella is auxotrophic, and requires thiamine for growth; cells cannot use nitrate as a nitrogen source. Auxenochlorella can be characterized by its trilaminar outer wall layer and lack of pyrenoid. A recent phylogenetic analysis has clarified its position with respect to related strains.

== Industrial applications ==
=== Biofuels ===
Auxenochlorella protothecoides has potential in biofuel production, as it can accumulate high lipid content under heterotrophic conditions. The A. protothecoides genome has been sequenced and compared to two other species (C. variabilis and Coccomyxa subellipsoidea). It was found to have a smaller genome size that encodes fewer genes, fewer multi-copy genes, fewer unique genes, and fewer genome rearrangements than its close relatives. Furthermore, three genes were identified that enable the consumption of glucose and, thus, heterotrophic growth. These three Chlorella-specific hexose-proton symporter (HUP)-like genes, in addition to rapid pyruvate synthesis, fatty acid synthesis enzyme upregulation, and fatty acid degradation enzyme downregulation, contribute to the high lipid content.

The algae have also been shown to grow on plethora of media, including glycerol, glucose, and acetate. One study showed that the Auxenochlorella heterotrophically synthesized a maximum crude lipid content of 55.2% dry weight. Separate studies have confirmed that large amounts of lutein, a type of carotenoid that can be used as a drop-in fuel source, are also produced.

Auxenochlorella biofuel production poses similar efficiency problems as other algal species, as the pyrolysis and drying process are expensive and time- consuming. In addition, the biofuel studies were generally done with fed batch culture in order for the algae to maintain log phase growth and maximize yields, a process that may be expensive on a larger scale.

=== Wastewater treatment ===
The sludge produced in wastewater treatment plants may provide a potential nutrient source for algae in the production of biodiesel while simultaneously creating an ecofriendly recycling process for the byproducts of sewage plants. Over a 6-day period, Auxenochlorella strains were able to remove 59% of the total nitrogen, 81% of the total phosphorus, and 96% of the total organic carbon from the waste while maintaining a high lipid productivity rate.

Higher biomass production can be accomplished with a heterotrophic/mixotrophic growth mix using wastewater and biodiesel-derived glycerol. The lipid content can be lower in wastewater than in a synthetic medium, however. Thus, cost-benefit analyses are needed to determine when nutrient addition may be required and beneficial to foster algal growth. The lipid-extracted biomass can be used for a multitude of functions: biogas production, a biofertilizer carrier, biofertilizer itself, biochar production, and an ingredient in animal feed. Microalgal-treated wastewater may not be flawless drinking water, but it could be more suitable for irrigation purposes. Additionally, if the wastewater after the microalga harvest is subjected to water-treatment protocols, it reportedly reduces the operational cost of the water-treatment process.

=== Food applications ===
Auxenochlorella protothecoides is rich in polyunsaturated fatty acids which may be used as dietary supplements. Auxenochlorella protothecoides biomass has been incorporated in meat analogues and its protein isolates have been investigated for the stabilization of emulsions and foams.

The dried, milled biomass of A. protohecoides strain S106, called algal flour or whole algal flour, was approved for use as a partial replacement for some foods in 2014 by both the United States (as Generally Recognized as Safe) and Canada Health. Although algal flour was approved by these agencies, Soylent announced in 2016 that it would remove algal flour from its products, citing it as a possible cause of reported gastrointestinal issues in its customers.

In the European Union in 2022, a consultation request was made to determine novel food status for algal flour. according to European Union (EU) regulations. It was concluded that A. protothecoides and other Chlorella sp. have a documented history of consumption in the EU and therefore do not fall under the scope of the EU novel food regulation, meaning it does not need pre-market authorization.
