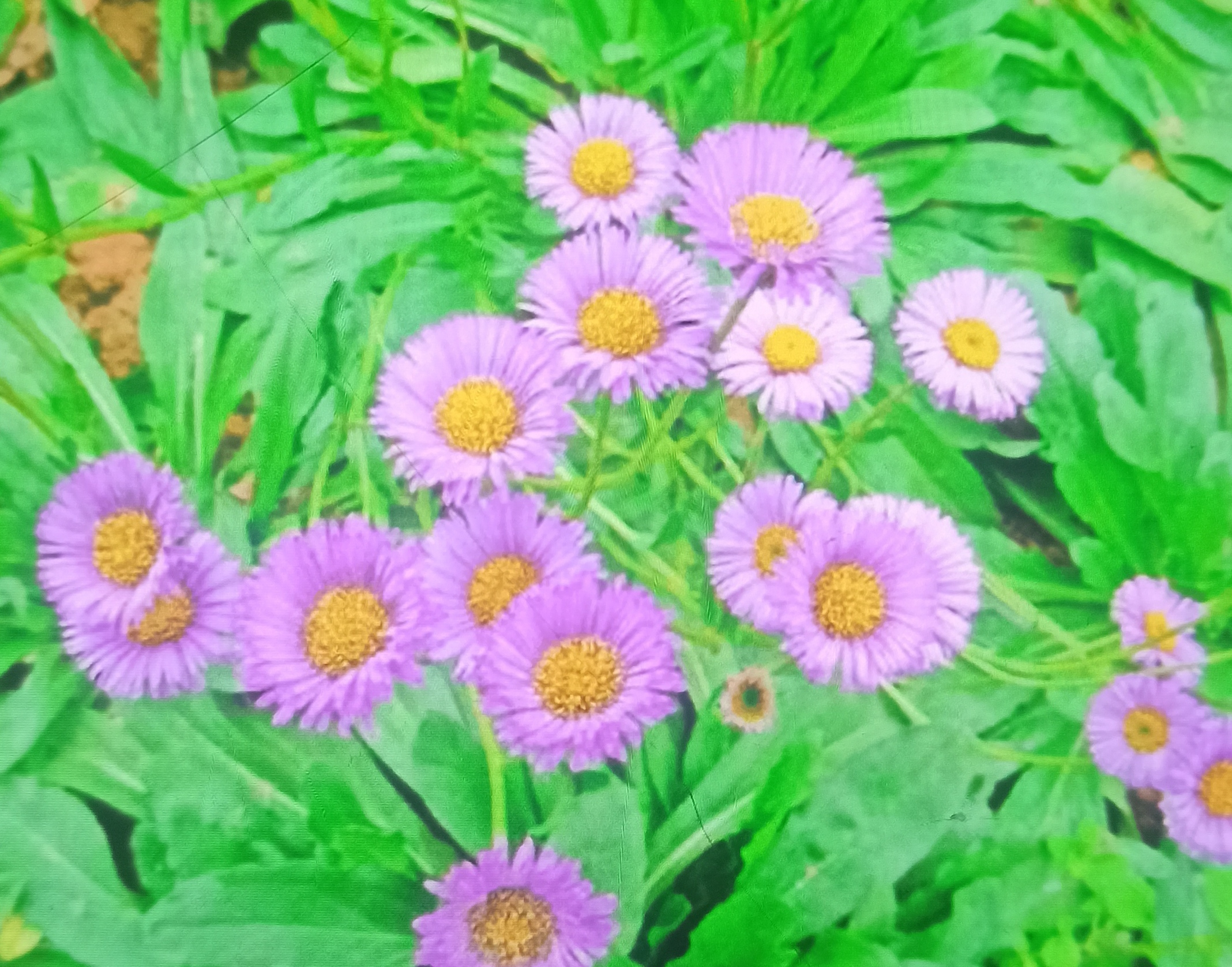

Scientific classification
- Kingdom: Plantae
- Clade: Tracheophytes
- Clade: Angiosperms
- Clade: Eudicots
- Clade: Asterids
- Order: Asterales
- Family: Asteraceae
- Genus: Erigeron
- Species: E. breviscapus

Binomial name
- Erigeron breviscapus (Vaniot) Hand.-Mazz.

Synonyms
- Aster breviscapus Vaniot; Erigeron dielsii (Vaniot) H.Lév.; Erigeron praecox Vierh. & Hand.-Mazz.

= Erigeron breviscapus =

Species of flowering plant

Erigeron breviscapus is a Chinese species of flowering plants in the family Asteraceae. It has been found only in China, in the provinces of Guangxi, Guizhou, Hunan, Sichuan, Tibet, and Yunnan.

Erigeron breviscapus is a perennial, clump-forming herb up to 50 cm (20 inches) tall, though in some cases less than 1 cm (0.4 inches) tall. Its flower heads have blue, purple, or white ray florets surrounding yellow disc florets.
