= Aureococcus =

Scientific classification
- Domain: Eukaryota
- Clade: Sar
- Clade: Stramenopiles
- Division: Ochrophyta
- Class: Dictyochophyceae
- Order: Pelagomonadales
- Family: Pelagomonadaceae
- Genus: Aureococcus
- Species: A. anophagefferens

Binomial name
- Aureococcus anophagefferens Hargraves & Sieburth, 1988

Species of alga

Aureococcus anophagefferens is a species of heterokont alga. Its cells, with a diameter of about 2 μm, have a single chloroplast, nucleus, and mitochondrion and an unusual exocellular polysaccharide-like layer. It causes harmful algal blooms. It is the only species in the genus Aureococcus.
