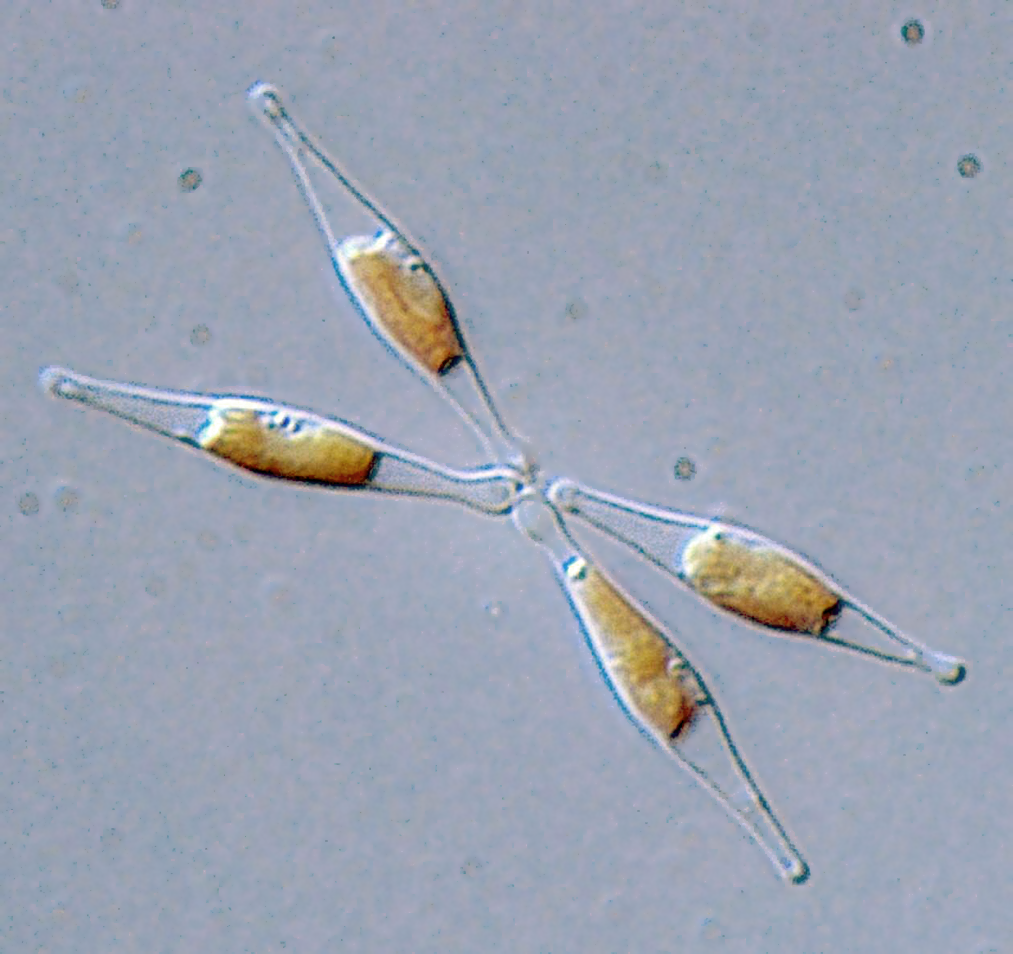

Scientific classification
- Domain: Eukaryota
- Clade: Sar
- Clade: Stramenopiles
- Division: Ochrophyta
- Clade: Bacillariophyta
- Class: Bacillariophyceae
- Order: Surirellales
- Suborder: Neidiineae
- Family: Neidiaceae
- Genus: Phaeodactylum; Bohlin
- Species: P. tricornutum

Binomial name
- Phaeodactylum tricornutum Bohlin, 1897

= Phaeodactylum =

Species of single-celled organism

Phaeodactylum tricornutum is a diatom, the only species in the genus Phaeodactylum. Unlike other diatoms, P. tricornutum can exist in different morphotypes (fusiform, triradiate, and oval) and changes in cell shape can be stimulated by environmental conditions. This feature can be used to explore the molecular basis of cell shape control and morphogenesis. Unlike most diatoms, P. tricornutum can grow in the absence of silicon and can survive without making silicified frustules. This provides opportunities for experimental exploration of silicon-based nanofabrication in diatoms.

Another peculiarity is that during asexual reproduction the frustules do not appear to become smaller. This allows continuous culture without need for sexual reproduction. It is not known if P. tricornutum can reproduce sexually. To date no substantial evidence has been found to support sexual reproduction in a laboratory or other setting. Although P. tricornutum can be considered to be an atypical pennate diatom, it is one of the main diatom model species. A transformation protocol has been established and RNAi vectors are available. This makes molecular genetic studies much easier.

== History ==
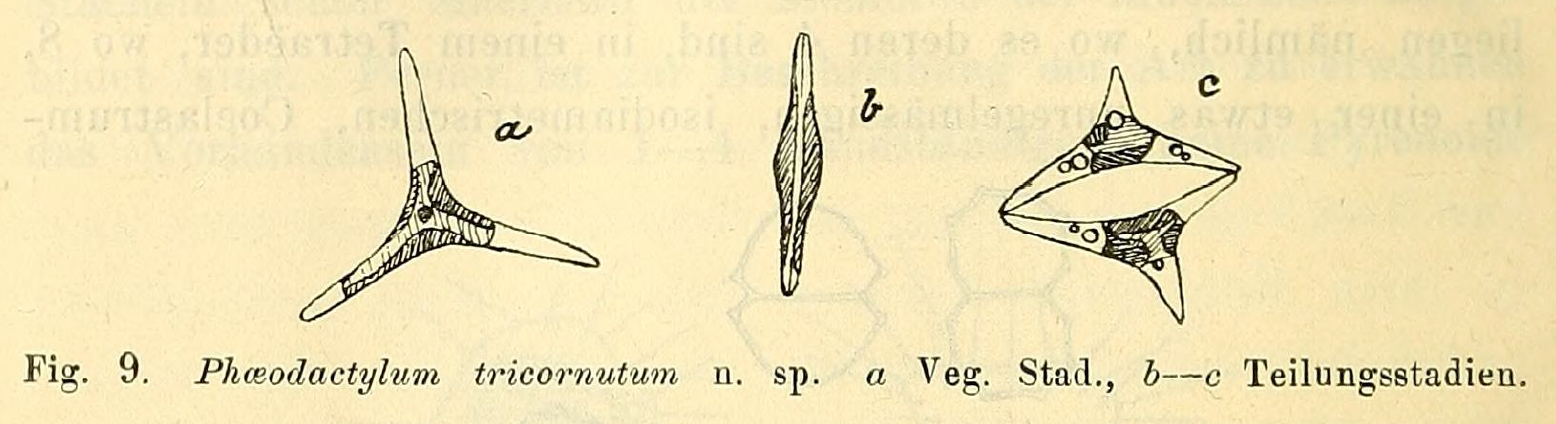
Original drawings of P. tricornutum by Bohlin

Phaeodactylum tricornutum was first described in the triradiate morphotype by Bohlin in 1897. Recordings of the first cultures of P. tricornutum were published by Allen and Nelson in 1910, although it was misidentified as Nitzschia colsterium,W. Sm., forma miuntissima. The isolate was later correctly revised as P. tricorntum by J.C. Lewin in 1958. This strain among other later isolates are still maintained in culture collections around the world.

== Genome sequencing ==
Phaeodactylum tricornutum is one of a handful of diatoms whose genome has been sequenced. As of 2023, P. tricornutum is the only diatom for which a telomere-to-telomere genome assembly exists. P. tricornutum is a diploid organism with 25 pairs of nuclear chromosomes.

P. tricornutum has emerged as a potential microalgal energy source. It grows rapidly and storage lipids constitute about 20-30% of its dry cell weight under standard culture conditions. Nitrogen limitation can induce neutral lipid accumulation in P. tricornutum, indicating possible strategies for improving microalgal biodiesel production.

== See also ==
- Algaculture
- Genomics
