= Joint Genome Institute =

Research facility in California, US

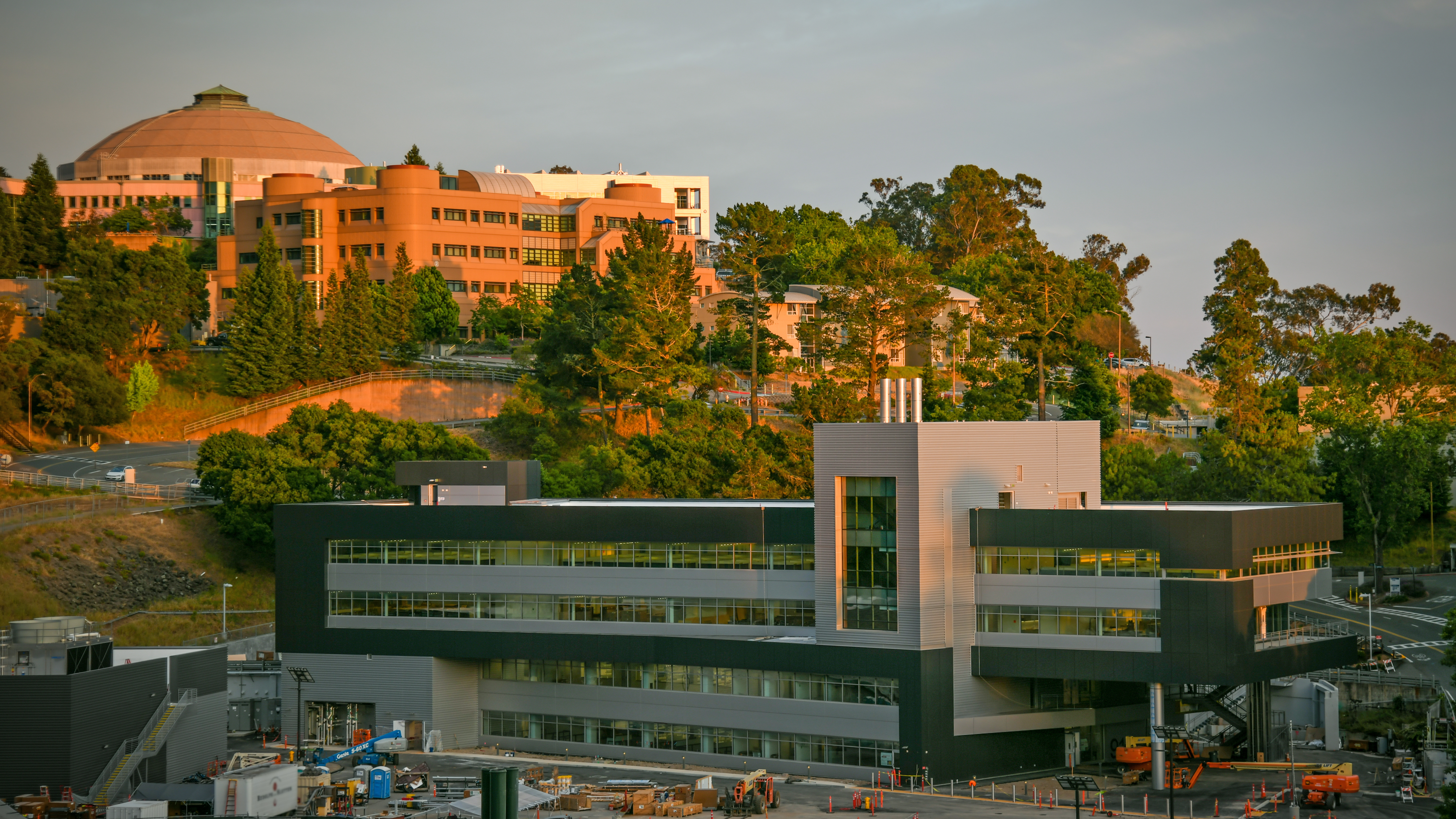
The Integrative Genomics Building (IGB) at Lawrence Berkeley National Laboratory (Berkeley Lab), the home of the DOE Joint Genome Institute and the DOE Systems Biology Knowledgebase (KBase). The Advanced Light Source (ALS) is above in the background.

The Joint Genome Institute (JGI) is a scientific user facility for integrative genomic science at Lawrence Berkeley National Laboratory. The mission of the JGI is to advance genomics research in support of the United States Department of Energy's (DOE) missions of energy and the environment. It is one of three national scientific user facilities supported by the Office of Biological and Environmental Research (BER) within the Department of Energy's Office of Research. These BER facilities are part of a more extensive network of 28 national scientific user facilities that operate at the DOE national laboratories.

The JGI advances genomics research by providing the research community with access to the latest generation of genome sequencing and analysis capabilities. It employs a staff of 250 scientists, technicians, and other personnel to support the research of the 2,180 scientific users who make use of it for their research each year. The facility sequenced 658 trillion total bases in FY 2022, and this output is now doubling about every two years.

== Research at JGI ==
Research at JGI is organized into seven programs:

- Plant Program The Plant Program focuses on the fundamental biology of photosynthesis and characterizing the role of terrestrial plants in carbon sequestration and the development of plant feedstocks for biofuels.
- Fungal & Algal Program The Fungal & Algal Program scale-up the sequencing and analysis of genomes to explore the diversity of fungi and algae that play a critical role in bioenergy and environmental research.
- Metagenome ProgramThe Metagenome Program leverages high-throughput sequencing to uncover the principles governing microbial community functions and interactions that impact ecosystem processes.
- Microbial ProgramThe Microbial Program exploits expertise and emerging technologies in sequencing, annotation and analysis, to deliver high quality and high throughput sequence-based science.
- DNA Synthesis Science Program The DNA Synthesis Science Program is focused on the identification and refactoring of biological pathways with potential application in DOE mission-relevant areas.
- Metabolics ProgramThe Metabolomics Program provides functional annotation of genomes and improved understanding of the role of small molecules in diverse biological systems.
- Secondary Metabolites The Secondary Metabolites Group identifies and pursues opportunities associated with secondary metabolite discovery and characterization.

The JGI provides users with access, at no cost, to high-throughput genomic and specialized capabilities and data analysis. Researchers submit proposals to one of the seven JGI user programs, and all proposals are reviewed for scientific merit and relevance to the DOE research mission. If the proposal is approved, the JGI provides the users a number of standard sequencing, synthesis, and metabolomics products.

== Collaborations ==
The JGI collaborates extensively with the Environmental Molecular Sciences Laboratory at Pacific Northwest National Laboratory (PNNL). The two facilities jointly manage the Facilities Integrating Collaborations for User Science (FICUS) program, designed for researchers who require the capabilities of both user facilities to perform their research. The JGI also performs extensive sequencing on behalf of the four DOE Bioenergy Research Centers.

== Leadership ==
The director of JGI since 2017 is Nigel Mouncey. Mouncey also serves as the president of the Society for Industrial Microbiology and Biotechnology (SIMB)

== History ==
The Joint Genome Institute (JGI) was created in 1997 to unite the expertise and resources in genome mapping, DNA sequencing, technology development, and information sciences pioneered at the DOE genome centers at Lawrence Berkeley National Laboratory (Berkeley Lab), Lawrence Livermore National Laboratory (LLNL) and Los Alamos National Laboratory (LANL).In 1999, the University of California, which manages the three national labs for the DOE, leased laboratory and office space in a light industrial park in Walnut Creek, California to consolidate genome research activities. Led by biotechnology industry veteran Nigel Mouncey, who assumed the position of director in March 2017, the DOE JGI receives its funding from the Office of Biological and Environmental Research in DOE's Office of Science.

Originally established to work on the Human Genome Project—the JGI generated the complete sequences of Chromosomes 5, 16 and 19—the JGI has since shifted its focus to the non-human components of the biosphere, particularly those relevant to the DOE's science mission. Since 2004, the JGI has been a user facility that advances genomics research in a broad range of disciplines where DNA sequence information is likely to drive scientific discoveries.

In February 2004, the JGI launched the Community Sequencing Program (CSP), known as the Community Science Program, which provides the scientific community at large with access to high-throughput, high-quality sequencing, DNA synthesis, metabolomics and analysis capabilities. The projects involve many important multicellular organisms, microbes and communities of microbes called metagenomes (or microbiomes) related to the DOE mission areas of bioenergy, understanding global cycles such as the carbon cycle, and biogeochemistry and are chosen primarily based on scientific merit as determined by outside review.

== Genome sequencing milestones ==
In 2006, the JGI published the genome of the first tree sequenced—the cottonwood (Populus trichocarpa). In partnership with other federal institutions and universities, the JGI has also published the genome sequences of sorghum, a candidate feedstock for biofuels and biomanufacturing.

== Data management systems ==
JGI also develops and maintains several comparative genomics platforms, including Phytozome, a database for sequenced plant and green algal genomes.

The Integrated Microbial Genomes System (IMG), which provides a framework for comparative analysis of primarily microbial genomes, though the system also supports eukaryotic genomes and environmental samples. Its goal is to facilitate the visualization and exploration of genomes from a functional and evolutionary perspective.
