= Henry Bryant Bigelow =

American oceanographer and marine biologist (1879–1967)

- Born: October 3, 1879; Boston, Massachusetts, US
- Died: December 11, 1967 (aged 88); Concord, Massachusetts
- Education: Harvard University
- Known for: Woods Hole Oceanographic Institution; Fishes of the Gulf of Maine
- Spouse: Elizabeth Perkins Shattuck
- Awards: Alexander Agassiz Medal (1931); William Bowie Medal (1944); Daniel Giraud Elliot Medal (1948)
- Scientific career
- Workplaces: Museum of Comparative Zoology (Harvard), Woods Hole Oceanographic Institution
- Doctoral advisor: Edward Laurens Mark
- Other academic advisors: Alexander Agassiz
- Author abbrev. (zoology): Bigelow

Henry Bryant Bigelow (October 3, 1879 – December 11, 1967) was an American oceanographer and marine biologist. He was a professor at Harvard University for 60 years and was the founding director of the Woods Hole Oceanographic Institution. The U.S. research vessel NOAAS Henry B. Bigelow was named in his honor.

== Life and career ==
He was the grandson of Henry Bryant who was an American physician and naturalist.

After graduating from Harvard in 1901, he began working with famed ichthyologist Alexander Agassiz. Bigelow accompanied Agassiz on several major marine science expeditions including one aboard the Albatross in 1907. He began working at the Museum of Comparative Zoology in 1905 and joined Harvard's faculty in 1906 where he worked for 62 years.

In 1911, Bigelow was elected a Fellow of the American Academy of Arts and Sciences. He helped found the Woods Hole Oceanographic Institution in 1930 and was its founding director. He was elected to the United States National Academy of Sciences in 1931 and the American Philosophical Society in 1937. During his life he published more than one hundred papers and several books. He was an expert on coelenterates and elasmobranchs.

In 1948 Bigelow was awarded the Daniel Giraud Elliot Medal from the National Academy of Sciences.

== Honors ==
The Henry Bryant Bigelow Medal in Oceanography is awarded by the Woods Hole Oceanographic Institution to honor "those who make significant inquiries into the phenomena of the sea". Bigelow was the first recipient of the medal in 1960.

He was honored by the naming of the National Oceanic and Atmospheric Administration research vessel NOAAS Henry B. Bigelow (R 225).

== Legacy ==
First published in 1953, Bigelow's Fishes of the Gulf of Maine (with William C. Schroeder) continued to be a useful reference for the fishing and scientific communities for 50 years. The Smithsonian Institution Press published a heavily revised third edition in 2002.

=== Descriptions ===
Bigelow described numerous new species to science, 110 of which are recognized today according to the World Register of Marine Species. See Category:Taxa named by Henry Bryant Bigelow.

=== Species named for Bigelow ===
Some 26 species and two genera (Bigelowina, stomatopods in family Nannosquillidae, and Bigelowiella, protists in family Chlorarachniophyte) are named after him, including Bigelow's ray, Rajella bigelowi, and Etmopterus bigelowi, a lantern shark.
