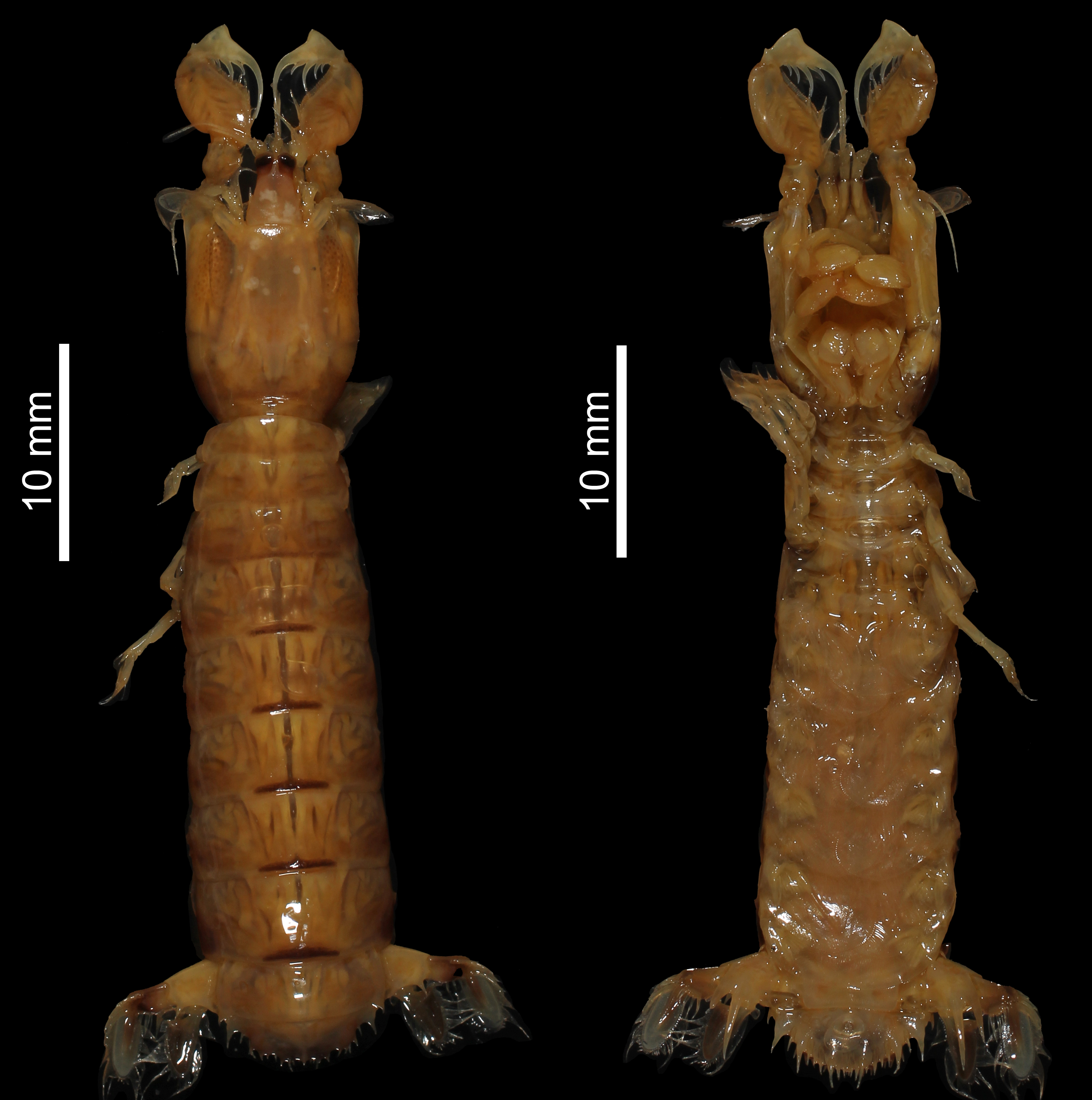
- Dorsal (left) and ventral (right) views of female holotype, collected near Toliara (MNHN collections)

Scientific classification
- Kingdom: Animalia
- Phylum: Arthropoda
- Class: Malacostraca
- Order: Stomatopoda
- Family: Nannosquillidae
- Genus: Acanthosquilla
- Species: A. derijardi

Binomial name
- Acanthosquilla derijardi Manning, 1970

Synonyms
- Acanthosquilla sirindhorn Naiyanetr 1995

= Acanthosquilla derijardi =

Crustacean from the Indo-Pacific region

Acanthosquilla derijardi is a species of stomatopod crustacean. Its distribution is widespread throughout the Indo-West Pacific. The species was initially described by the American carcinologist Raymond B. Manning in 1970. Its junior synonym, A. sirindhorn, was named in 1995 in honor of Princess Sirindhorn of Thailand.

== Taxonomic history ==
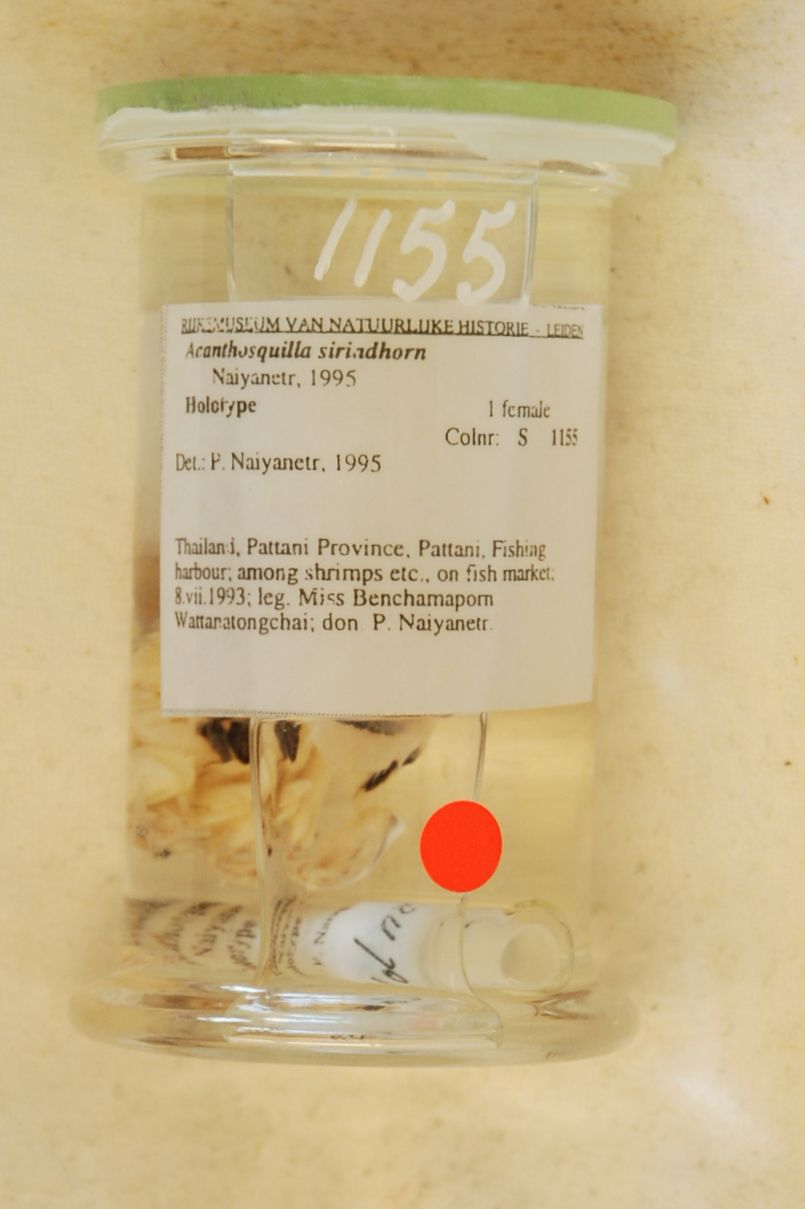
Holotype of the junior synonym A. sirindhorn

The American carcinologist Raymond B. Manning first named and described A. derijardi in 1970. Manning named the specific epithet after Raoul R. Derijard, who had assembled the collection of specimens while he was working at the Station Marine de Tuléar. The three paratypes were deposited in the United States National Museum. Manning's species description also reclassified a specimen from British North Borneo as being A. derijardi; Michael Tweedie illustrated this specimen in 1949, initially identifying it as Lysiosquilla multifasciata.

The junior synonym A. sirindhorn was named by Phaibul Naiyanetr in 1995 based on specimens from southern Thailand; its specific epithet honors Princess Maha Chakri Sirindhorn of Thailand due to her interest in the natural history of Thailand and because she wrote a children's book (Note: Sirindhorn published the book แก้วจอมแก่น Kǣo čhō̜m kǣn under the pseudonym Wǣn Kǣo in 1978. Its English translation Kaew the Playful was published in 2014.) where a mantis shrimp similar to the described species plays an important role. The type specimen was deposited in the Nationaal Natuurhistorisch Museum in Leiden. The Australian carcinologist Shane T. Ahyong synonymized A. sirindhorn with A. derijardi in 2001.

In 1995, Manning suggested A. multispinosa and A. manningi could be junior synonyms of A. derijardi writing he could "find no characters to separate" them; he included them in his synonymy list prefixed with a question mark. The Indonesian marine biologist Mohammad Kassim Moosa also listed these two species as question mark–tagged synonyms in a 2000 checklist. In 2001, Ahyong included these two as well as A. sirindhorn as junior synonyms of A. derijardi without using any question mark. However, subsequent research has conformed the taxonomic validity of both A. manningi and A. multispinosa as distinct species. Ahyong later included some specimens he had previously identified as A. derijardi as in fact belonging to a new, separate species: A. melissae.

== Distribution ==
A. derijardi is found throughout the Indo-West Pacific: its range extends from Madagascar and the Red Sea to Australia, New Caledonia and Taiwan. The type locality for A. derijardi is Grand Récif of Toliara, in southwestern Madagascar; the three other specimens in the type series came from Tinakta Island, Tawi-Tawi Group, Sulu Archipelago, in the southwestern Philippines. The type locality for the junior synonym A. sirindhorn was a fishing harbor near Pattani in southern Thailand.

The Dutch carcinologist Lipke Holthuis recorded a specimen of A. derijardi collected from the Gulf of Aqaba at the northern tip of the Red Sea in 1975 marking one of the extremes of the species's range. Ayhong has documented this species on Big Sister's Island in Singapore, and Tweedie's misidentified specimen was from Sandakan, now in Malaysia. Within Indonesia, Moosa has also noted specimens in Jakarta Bay on Kai Dulah Island, Kai Islands, Maluku Islands, and in the Java Sea. It has also been found in Taiwan, specifically Donggang fishing port in Pingtung County. Ayhong also included A. derijardi in a checklist of Japanese stomatopods.

Specimens have also been found in New Caledonia. and the Chesterfield Islands. The United States National Museum has a specimen from Jokaj Island, Pohnpei, in the Caroline Islands; which Holthuis identifies as being A. derijardi. Ahyong has also recorded specimens from Little Trunk Reef, off Queensland, Australia. A specimen tentatively identified as A. derijardi was collected in the Seychelles.

They are found in the intertidal zone up to a depth of 35 metres (115 ft).

== Description ==
The telson's dorsal row of spines has one median spine, three submedian spines, and six lateral spines. The dactylus of the raptorial claw has a large distal lobe on the outer proximal margin, which can extend distally to the fifth occlusal tooth. The rostral plate consists of a long proximal trapezoidal section and a rostral spine whose length is less than a quarter of the total rostral length. Males can have a total length of 66 mm (2.6 in); females can have a total length of 31 mm (1.2 in). Their body is light in color but dark bands span across it transversely. The telson and uropod both have dark, diffuse colloration; the distal segment on the uropodal exopod is dark on its inner half.
