= Platysquilla eusebia =

Scientific classification
- Kingdom: Animalia
- Phylum: Arthropoda
- Clade: Pancrustacea
- Class: Malacostraca
- Order: Stomatopoda
- Family: Nannosquillidae
- Genus: Platysquilla
- Species: P. eusebia

Binomial name
- Platysquilla eusebia (Risso, 1816)

Synonyms
- Squilla eusebia Risso, 1816

Species of crustacean

Platysquilla eusebia is a species of mantis shrimp in the family Nannosquillidae, from the Mediterranean Sea and north-eastern Atlantic Ocean. It is a spearer, and grows up to 7 cm (2.8 in) long.

== Distribution ==
P. eusebia is found in the Mediterranean Sea and adjacent parts of the Atlantic Ocean. It is one of only two species of mantis shrimp found in waters around the British Isles (the other being Rissoides desmaresti). Its occurrence in Galway Bay off the west coast of Ireland may represent the northern limit of its distribution.

== Description ==
P. eusebia grows up to 7 centimetres (2.8 in) long. It is a mantis shrimp of the spearer type, possessing raptorial claws with nine or more teeth. It may be distinguished from the other species in its genus, P. enodis and P. horologii, by the number of epipods, and from Rissoides desmaresti by the number of spines on the last segment of the raptorial claw, with R. desmaresti having only five.

== Taxonomy ==
Although previously placed in the family Squillidae, Platysquilla is now considered a member of the Nannosquillidae. P. eusebia was originally described in the genus Squilla, but was moved by Raymond B. Manning to be the type species of the new genus Platysquilla in 1967.
