= Sirindhornia =

Sirindhornia is the scientific name of two genera of organisms and may refer to:

- Sirindhornia (moth), a genus of insects in the family Tortricidae
- Sirindhornia (plant), a genus of plants in the family Orchidaceae
