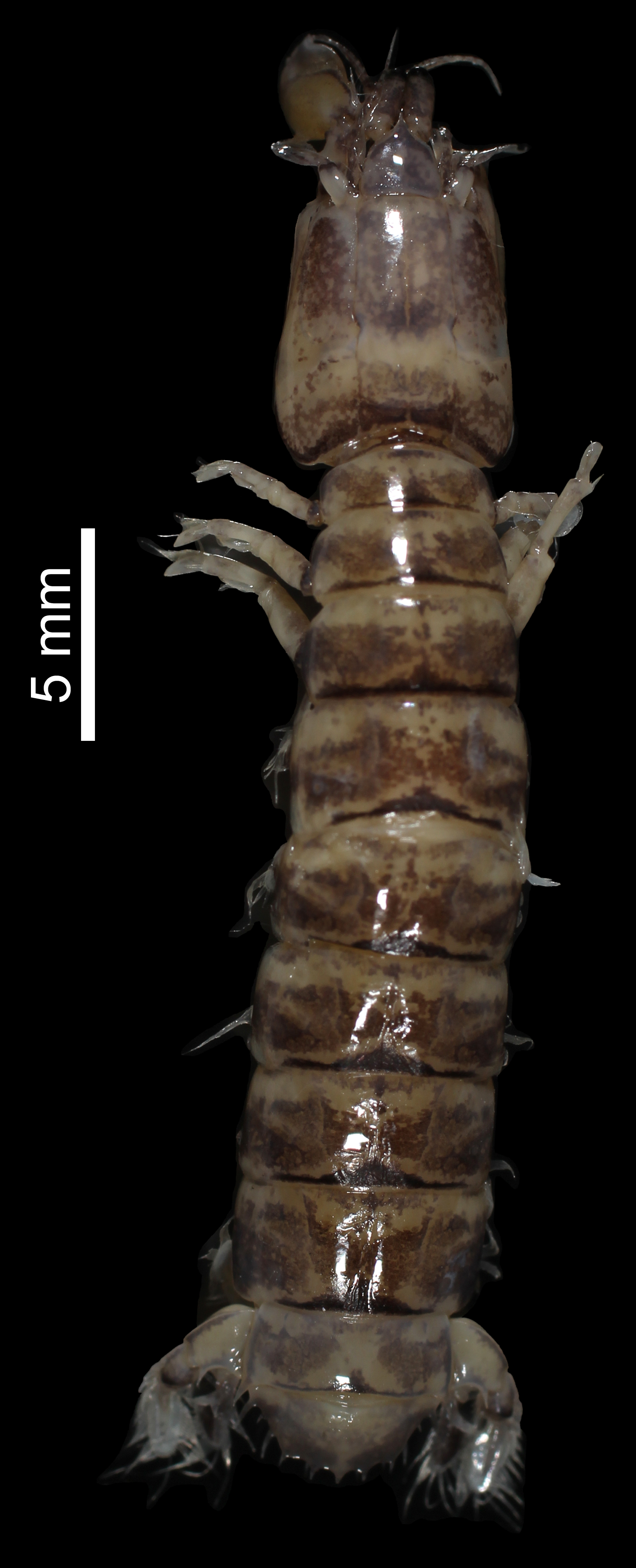
- MNHN-IU-2014-23101
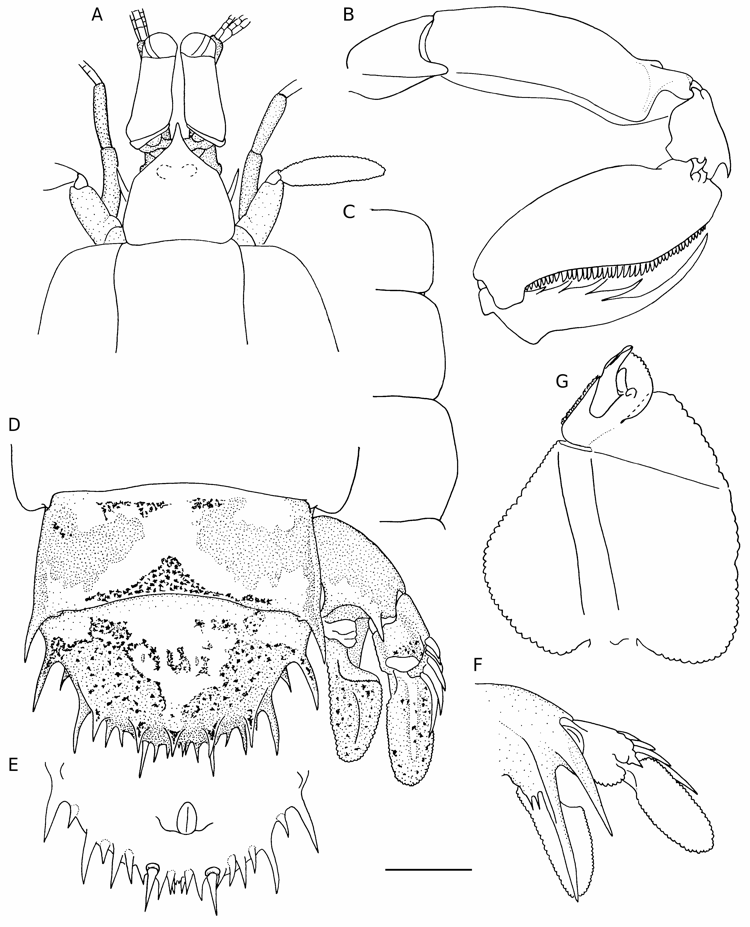
- Fig.7 A. crosnieri, tl 33 mm (holotype); A, anterior cephalon, dorsal; B, raptorial claw, right lateral; C, TS6-8, right dorsal; D, AS5-6, telson and uropod, dorsal; E, telson, ventral; F, uropod, left ventral; G, pleopod 1 endopod, right anterior. Scale bar: A-F, 2 mm; G, 1 mm

Scientific classification
- Kingdom: Animalia
- Phylum: Arthropoda
- Class: Malacostraca
- Order: Stomatopoda
- Family: Nannosquillidae
- Genus: Acanthosquilla
- Species: A. crosnieri

Binomial name
- Acanthosquilla crosnieri Ahyong, 2002

= Acanthosquilla crosnieri =

Species of crustacean

Acanthosquilla crosnieri is a species of stomatopod crustacean in the Nannosquillidae family. It has been found in waters off the Marquesas, at depths of 0 - 100 m but more usually at 7 - 25 m, and was first described by the Australian carcinologist Shane T. Ahyong in 2002.
