= NOAAS Henry B. Bigelow =

Fisheries research vehicle

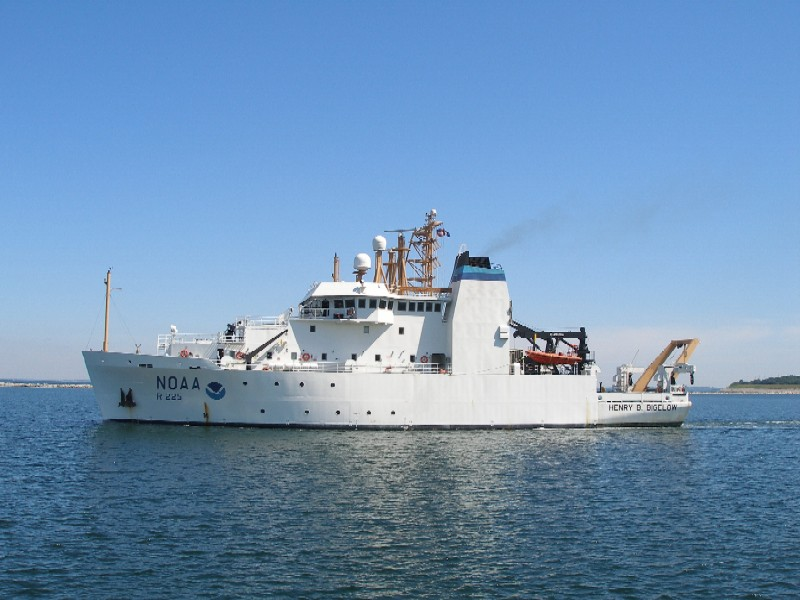

History

United States
- Name: NOAAS Henry B. Bigelow (R 225)
- Namesake: Henry Bryant Bigelow (1879–1967), American oceanographer, zoologist, and marine biologist
- Operator: National Oceanic and Atmospheric Administration (NOAA)
- Builder: VT Halter Marine, Inc., Moss Point, Mississippi
- Cost: $54 Million
- Laid down: 21 May 2004
- Launched: 8 July 2005
- Sponsored by: Kathleen Gregg, wife of Senator Judd Gregg, represented by Catherine Silver
- Completed: 20 July 2006 (delivered)
- Commissioned: 16 July 2007
- Home port: Newport, Rhode Island
- Identification: IMO number: 9349057; MMSI number: 369991000; Call sign: WTDF
- Status: Active

General characteristics
- Type: Fisheries research vessel
- Displacement: 1,840 metric tons (light); 2,479 metric tons (full load)
- Length: 63.8 m (209 ft)
- Beam: 15.0 m (49.2 ft)
- Draft: 5.90 m (19.4 ft) (centerboard retracted); 9.05 m (29.7 ft) (centerboard extended)
- Depth: 8.65 m (28.4 ft)
- Propulsion: Integrated diesel electric, 24-pulse DC SCR drive system; Two 1,150-kW (1,542-hp) propulsion motors on a common shaft; One 720 kW (970 hp) AC induction azimuthing bow thruster; Two 1,360-kW diesel generators; Two 910-kW diesel generators; One 4.3-meter-diameter (14-foot) fixed-pitch propeller
- Speed: 14 knots (sustained); Up to 11 knots during hydroacoustic surveying
- Range: 12,000 nmi at 12 knots
- Endurance: 40 days at 12 knots
- Complement: 39 (20 crew and up to 19 scientists)

NOAAS Henry B. Bigelow (R 225) is a fisheries research vessel operated by the United States' National Oceanic Atmospheric Administration (NOAA). She is the second in a class of five fisheries research vessels. She is named after Henry Bryant Bigelow (1879-1967), the American oceanographer, zoologist, and marine biologist who founded the Woods Hole Oceanographic Institution in Woods Hole, Massachusetts.

== Construction and commissioning ==
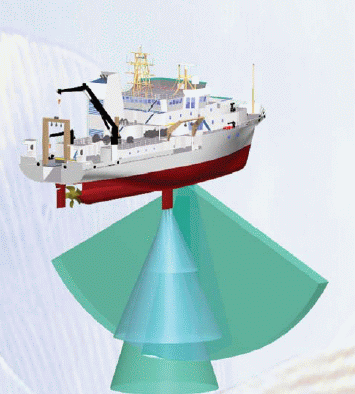
NOAAS Henry B. Bigelow (R 225) is equipped with multiple sonar systems.

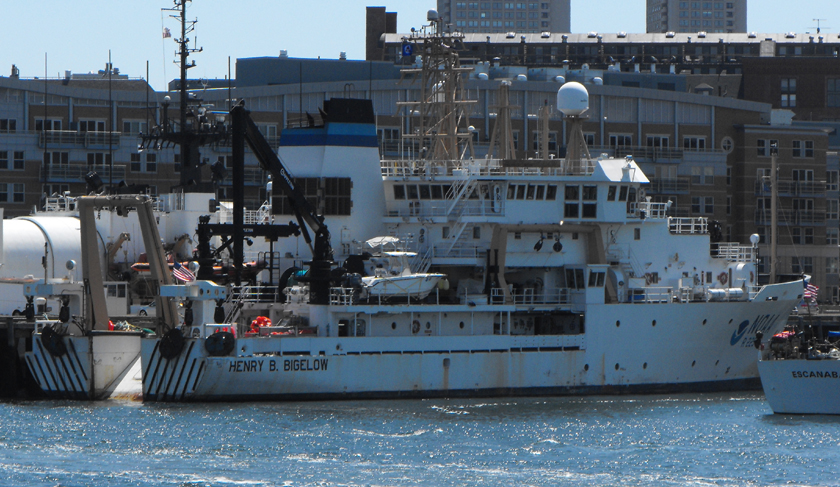
NOAAS Henry B. Bigelow (R 225) in Boston Harbor in 2010.

Henry B. Bigelow was built by VT Halter Marine, Inc., at Moss Point, Mississippi. Her keel was laid on 21 May 2004 and she was launched on 8 July 2005. The ship was the first to be named through the "Name NOAA's New Ship" series of educational outreach contests, with the winning entry submitted by a team of five students: Crystal Lamott, Carrie McEwen, Crystal Syvinski, Maddie Dillon and Max Del Viscio from Winnacunnet High School in Hampton, New Hampshire, along with their marine biology teacher, Catherine Silver. Silver represented the ship's sponsor, Kathleen Gregg, the wife of New Hampshire Senator Judd Gregg, at the launching ceremony and christened the ship. NOAA commissioned Henry B. Bigelow on 16 July 2007.

== Characteristics and capabilities ==
Capable of conducting multidisciplinary oceanographic operations in support of biological, chemical, and physical process studies, Henry B. Bigelow was commissioned as the second of a class of five of the most advanced fisheries research vessels in the world, with a unique capability to conduct both fishing and oceanographic research. She is a stern trawler with fishing capabilities similar to those of commercial fishing vessels. She is rigged for longlining and trap fishing and can conduct trawling operations to depths of 6,000 feet (1,800 meters). Her most advanced feature is the incorporation of United States Navy-type acoustic quieting technology to enable NOAA scientists to monitor fish populations without the ship's noise altering the behavior of the fish, including advanced quieting features incorporated into her machinery, equipment, and propeller. Her oceanographic hydrophones are mounted on a retractable centerboard, or drop keel, that lowers scientific transducers away from the region of hull-generated flow noise, enhancing the quality of the data collected. To take full advantage of these advanced data-gathering capabilities, she has the Scientific Sonar System, which can accurately measure the biomass of fish in a survey area. She also has an Acoustic Doppler Current Profiler with which to collect data on ocean currents and a multibeam sonar system that provides information on the content of the water column and on the type and topography of the seafloor while she is underway, and she can gather hydrographic data at any speed up to 11 knots (20 km/h).

Henry B. Bigelow can deploy CTD instruments to measure the electrical conductivity, temperature, and chlorophyll fluorescence of sea water, as well as specialized gear such as Multiple Opening/Closing Net and Environmental Sensing System (MOCNESS) frames, towed vehicles, dredges, and bottom corers, and she can deploy and recover both floating and bottom-moored sensor arrays. While trawling, Henry B. Bigelow uses wireless and hard-wired systems to monitor the shape of the trawl net and to work in conjunction with an autotrawl system that sets trawl depth and trawl wire tension and adjusts the net configuration. She has marine mammal and marine bird survey stations.

In addition to her crew of 20, Henry B. Bigelow can accommodate up to 19 scientists.

== Service history ==
Officially classified as a "fisheries survey vessel" and with her home port Newport, Rhode Island, Henry B. Bigelow's primary mission is to study and monitor marine fisheries in the waters of the United States exclusive economic zone off the United States East Coast from Maine to North Carolina, including the Georges Bank off New England. She also observes weather, sea state, and other environmental conditions, conducts habitat assessments, and surveys marine bird and marine mammal – harbor porpoise, humpback whale, and right whale – populations.
