= Cryptochlora =

Scientific classification
- Domain: Eukaryota
- Supergroup: Rhizaria
- Phylum: Cercozoa
- Subphylum: Filosa
- Class: Chlorarachniophyceae
- Order: Chlorarachniales
- Family: Chlorarachniaceae
- Genus: Cryptochlora; Calderon-Saenz & Schnetter 1987
- Species: C. perforans

Binomial name
- Cryptochlora perforans Calderon-Saenz & Schnetter 1987

Genus of chlorarachniophytes

Cryptochlora is a genus of chlorarachid alga that includes the only species Cryptochlora perforans. It may belong to the family Chlorarachniidae.
