= Bigelowiella natans =

Scientific classification
- Domain: Eukaryota
- Supergroup: Rhizaria
- Phylum: Cercozoa
- Subphylum: Filosa
- Class: Chlorarachniophyceae
- Order: Chlorarachniales
- Family: Chlorarachniaceae
- Genus: Bigelowiella
- Species: B. natans

Binomial name
- Bigelowiella natans Moestrup, 2001

Species of single-celled organism

Bigelowiella natans is a species of chlorarachniophyte alga that is a model organism for the Rhizaria.

Chlorarachniophyte are unicellular marine algae with plastids of secondary endosymbiotic origin. Bigelowiella natans are a key resource for studying the supergroup of mostly unicellular eukaryotes.

== Genomes ==
The Bigelowiella natans genome was the first rhizarian nuclear genome to be sequenced. The genome contains 94.7 Mbp encoding for 21,708 genes.
