= Princess Maha Chakri Sirindhorn Natural History Museum =

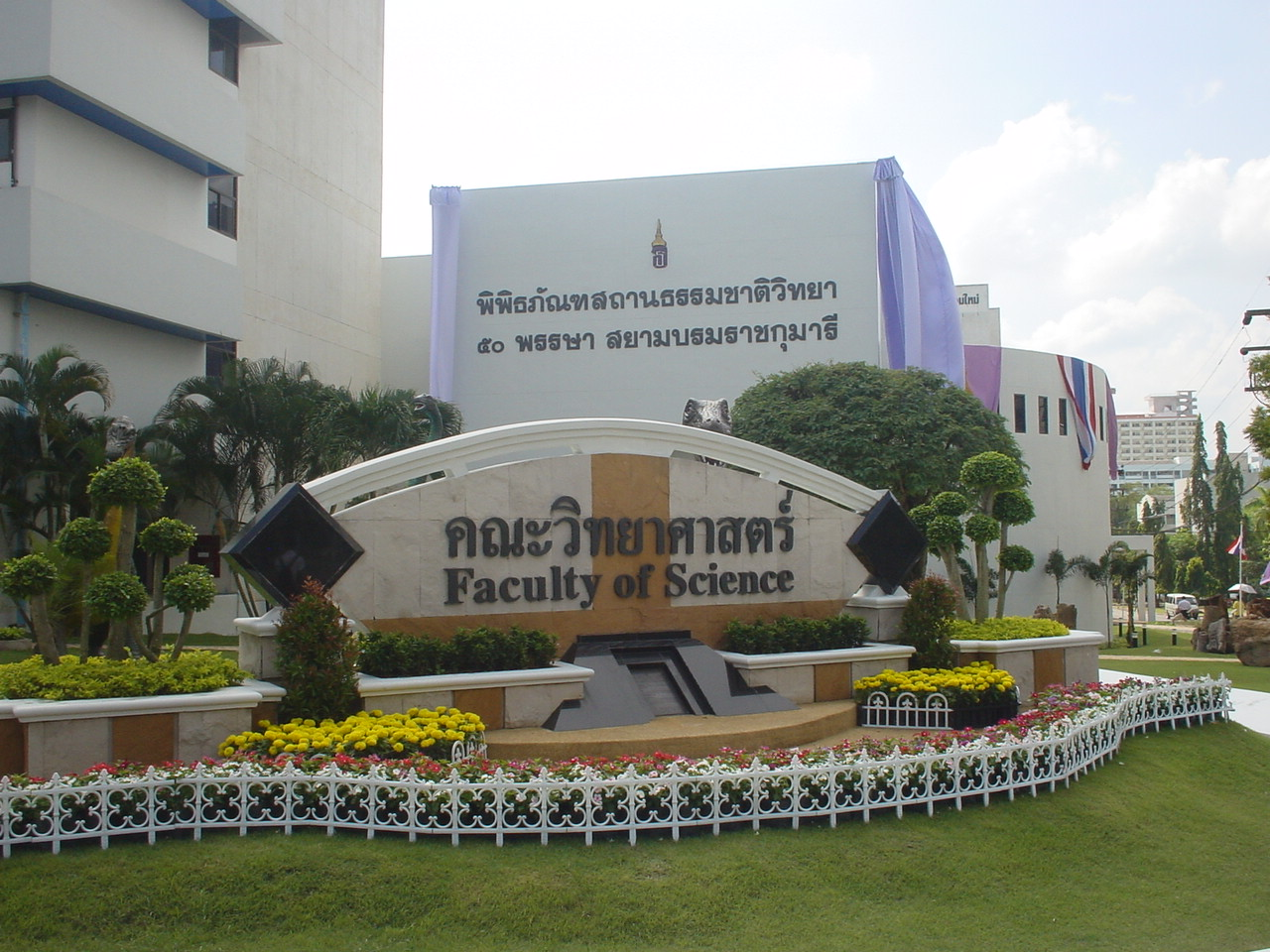
- Front of the museum from 2008
- Established: 2008
- Location: Prince of Songkla University, Hat Yai, Songkhla, Thailand
- Coordinates: 7.00773°N 100.49704°E
- Type: Natural history museum
- Collection size: 25,000
- Visitors: 30,000 - 40,000 annually
- Director: Chutamas Satasook
- Website: www.nhm.psu.ac.th

The Princess Maha Chakri Sirindhorn Natural History Museum is a natural history museum in the Prince of Songkla University in southern Thailand. It was originally known as the Natural History Museum of Prince of Songkla University (PSU Museum). After a renovation, it was renamed and re-opened on 14 January 2008 by HRH Princess Maha Chakri Sirindhorn. The museum's main building is located in the most west part of the Faculty of Science. The building contains both exhibition and collection areas.

The PSU Museum is a university's funded unit, having equal status to a faculty. However, it is still under inspection and assistance of the Faculty of Science. The museum works closely to the Department of Biology and the Excellent Centre of Biodiversity of Peninsular Thailand (CBIPT) as all three institutes are working on biodiversity research and conservation.

The museum's main collections are zoological collections, with only a small geological collection stored and displayed. The museum do not include the botanical collections as they are stored in the department's PSU Herbarium. Its zoological collections contains 25,000 specimens of 2,500 species of fauna. Some significant collections include coral, crustacean, plankton, mollusc (in particular cephalopod), echinoderm, insect and vertebrate. There are several significant type specimens, including Laotian Giant Flying Squirrel and Thongaree’s Disc-nosed Bat (the type species of genus Eudiscoderma).
