= Peperomia sirindhorniana =

Scientific classification
- Kingdom: Plantae
- Clade: Embryophytes
- Clade: Tracheophytes
- Clade: Angiosperms
- Clade: Magnoliids
- Order: Piperales
- Family: Piperaceae
- Genus: Peperomia
- Species: P. sirindhorniana

Binomial name
- Peperomia sirindhorniana Suwanph. & Chantar.

Species of flowering plant

Peperomia sirindhorniana is a species of flowering plant in the family Piperaceae. It is an annual plant with red stems and greenish-yellow inflorescences. The species is native to north-east Thailand, and was described in 2016.

== Taxonomy ==
The species was described in 2016, by Chalermpol Suwanphakdee and Pranom Chantaranothai.

== Distribution ==
Peperomia sirindhorniana is native to the wet tropical biome of north-eastern Thailand. It is found in the provinces of Loei and Khon Kaen.

It grows on limestone mountains, in shaded areas, at elevations of 500–800 metres (1,600–2,600 ft).

== Description ==
Peperomia sirindhorniana is an annual herb that grows 10–30 centimetres (3.9–11.8 in) high. The stems are red, and form a clump. The plant has fleshy stolons.

The leaves are arranged alernately, and grow on red, 1–1.5 centimetres (0.39–0.59 in) long stems. The leaves are light to dark green, fleshy when fresh, and ovate or heart-shaped. The leaves are 2–4 centimetres (0.79–1.57 in) long, 2–3.5 centimetres (0.79–1.38 in) wide, and has wavy edges with short hairs.

The inflorescence is a greenish-yellow spike or fascicle, measuring 5–15 centimetres (2.0–5.9 in) long, and 0.1–0.15 centimetres (0.039–0.059 in) wide. The inflorescence stem is red, and 1–2 centimetres (0.39–0.79 in) long. The flowers have an orbicular bract.

The fruit is 0.8–1 millimetre (0.031–0.039 in) wide, and covered with sticky protuberances. The plant flowers and fruits between August and December.

Peperomia sirindhorniana is similar to Peperomia pellucida.

== Nomenclature ==
The specific epithet refers to the Thai Royal Sirindhorn. Its common name is Rak-Ta-Nil.
