= Acanthosquilla melissae =

Scientific classification
- Kingdom: Animalia
- Phylum: Arthropoda
- Class: Malacostraca
- Order: Stomatopoda
- Family: Nannosquillidae
- Genus: Acanthosquilla
- Species: A. melissae

Binomial name
- Acanthosquilla melissae Ahyong, 2007

Species of crustacean

Holotype site: WAM C27142- Dampier Archipelago,'"`UNIQ--ref-0000000A-QINU`"' paratype sites: Shelburn Bay, QLD'"`UNIQ--ref-0000000B-QINU`"'

Acanthosquilla melissae is a species of stomatopod crustacean in the Nannosquillidae family, and was first described by the Australian carcinologist Shane T. Ahyong in 2007.

In Australia it has been found in the IMCRA regions of the Northwest Shelf Province (Western Australia), Northeast Shelf Transition (Queensland), in the sub-tidal zone.
