= Sirindhornia bifida =

Scientific classification
- Kingdom: Animalia
- Phylum: Arthropoda
- Class: Insecta
- Order: Lepidoptera
- Family: Tortricidae
- Genus: Sirindhornia
- Species: S. bifida

Binomial name
- Sirindhornia bifida Pinkaew & Muadsub, 2014

Species of moth

Sirindhornia bifida is a species of moth of the family Tortricidae. It is found in Thailand.

The length of the forewings is about 3.8 mm.
