= Sirindhornia curvicosta =

Scientific classification
- Kingdom: Animalia
- Phylum: Arthropoda
- Class: Insecta
- Order: Lepidoptera
- Family: Tortricidae
- Genus: Sirindhornia
- Species: S. curvicosta

Binomial name
- Sirindhornia curvicosta Pinkaew & Muadsub, 2014

Species of moth

Sirindhornia curvicosta is a species of moth of the family Tortricidae. It is found in Thailand. The habitat consist of secondary forests.

The length of the forewings is about 5.2 mm.

== Etymology ==
The species name refers to the strongly curved costa of the forewing just before the apex.
