= Kaew the Playful =

1978 children's novel by Waen Kaew

- English language edition of Kaew the Playful (2014 English language edition)
- Author: Waen Kaew
- Original title: แก้วจอมแก่น
- Translator: Sumalee
- Language: Thai, Chinese, English, French
- Genre: Children's literature, short story
- Publisher: (Thailand) Nanmeebooks
- Publication date: 1978
- Publication place: Thailand
- English publication date: 2014
- Pages: 328
- ISBN: 9786160418565

Kaew the Playful (Thai: แก้วจอมแก่น) is a children's literature series by Waen Kaew (Thai: แว่นแก้ว, Princess Maha Chakri Sirindhorn's pen name), the first entry being published in 1978. The novel is adapted from the author's own experience, it's the story of primary school girl Kaew and her friends.

== Chapters ==
#	Thai	Chinese	English
1	ล่อกั้ง	诱捕虾姑	To Lure Mantis Shrimp
2	ต้นไม้มหาภัย	祸害之树	The Treacherous Tree!
3	ความรับผิดชอบ	责任感	Responsibilities
4	ล่ามหาสมบัติ	挖掘财宝	Treasure Hunt
5	คืนฝนตก	雨夜	A Rainy Night
6	จันทร์อังคาธ	月蚀	The Moon Was Eaten!
7	โอ๊ย! ปวดท้องจริง	唉！肚子真疼	Ouch! Stomach ache!
8	ฝึกอาชีพ	职业训练	A Career Training
9	แม่ครัวหัวป่าก์	不听话的厨师	Master Chef
10	แก้วกับแก่น	盖珥和给恩	Kaew and Kaen
11	นักดนตรีเอก	卓越的音乐家	A Great Musician
12	ถามผี	请鬼神	Séance
13	เลี้ยงปลา	养鱼	Raising Fish
14	เก็บดอกบัว	摘荷花	Picking a Water Lily
15	ไทยรบพม่า	战争游戏	Thai vs Burmese!
16	นักวิทยาศาสตร์เอก	一流科学家	A Great Scientist
17	เรื่องของเห็ด	蘑菇的故事	The Mushroom Story
18	แต่งกลอน	写诗	Poetry Composition!
19	เพื่อนรัก	爱友	My Best Friend
20	แมว	猫	Cat
21	ลมว่าวคราวพัดมา	季候风吹来时	When the Kite Wind Blew
22	สัตว์ประหลาด	奇异的野兽	A Monster
23	ผีตาแป๊ะแก่	老公公鬼	A ghost of An Old Chinese Man

== Translation ==
In 1982, Guo Xuanying (Chinese: 郭宣颖) was ready to begin translating the royal work of Princess Sirindhorn of Thailand, and invited Chen Bochui, a writer of children's literature, to make a preface to "The Brilliant and Wonderful Scroll" (闪光美妙的画卷), at the same time, Princess Sirindhorn herself also wrote the Chinese preface in the Chinese translation of the work. In August 1983, the Chinese translation of the work was called "顽皮透顶的盖珥", published by Juvenile and Children's Publishing House in Shanghai (少年儿童出版社), belong to the "Foreign Children's Literature Series" (外国儿童文学丛书). 5000 copies of the first edition were printed and the remaining 50 copies were handed over to Princess Sirindhorn.
