= Sirindhorn =

Thai princess (born 1955)

Sirindhorn; สิรินธร
- Princess Royal of Thailand; Princess Debaratana Rajasuda
- Born: 2 April 1955 (age 71); Bangkok, Thailand
Names
- Maha Chakri Sirindhorn Maha Vajiralongkorn Vorarajbhakti Sirikitchakarini Birayabadhana Rathasima Gunakornpiyajat
- House: Mahidol
- Dynasty: Chakri
- Father: Bhumibol Adulyadej (Rama IX)
- Mother: Sirikit Kitiyakara
- Religion: Theravada Buddhism
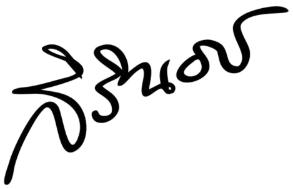
- Signature

Maha Chakri Sirindhorn, Princess Royal (Note: Thai: สมเด็จพระกนิษฐาธิราชเจ้า กรมสมเด็จพระเทพรัตนราชสุดา เจ้าฟ้ามหาจักรีสิรินธร มหาวชิราลงกรณวรราชภักดี สิริกิจการิณีพีรยพัฒน รัฐสีมาคุณากรปิยชาติ สยามบรมราชกุมารี, pronounced [sǒm.dèt.pʰráʔ.kā.nít.tʰǎː.tʰí.râːt.tɕâːw krōm.sǒm.dèt.pʰráʔ.tʰêːp.pʰā.rát.râːt.sù.dāː tɕâːw.fáː.mā.hǎː.tɕàk.krīː.sì.rīn.tʰɔ̄ːn mā.hǎː.wá.tɕʰí.rāː.lōŋ.kɔ̄ːn.wɔ̄ː.rā.râːt.tɕʰā.pʰák.dīː sì.rì.kìt.tɕā.kāː.rí.nīː.phīː.rā.já.pʰát rát.tʰā.sǐː.māː.kʰú.nāː.kɔ̄ːn.pì.já.tɕʰâːt sā.jǎːm.bɔ̄ː.rōm.mā.râːt.tɕʰā.kū.māː.rīː]) (born 2 April 1955) is a member of the Thai royal family. She is the second daughter of King Bhumibol Adulyadej (Rama IX) and Queen Sirikit, and the younger sister of King Vajiralongkorn (Rama X).

== Early life ==
=== Birth ===
Sirindhorn was born on 2 April 1955, at Amphorn Sathan Residential Hall, Dusit Palace, the third child of King Bhumibol Adulyadej (Rama IX) and Queen Sirikit. As the royal couple has only one son, the Thai constitution was altered in 1974 to allow for female succession. This made Princess Sirindhorn second-in-line to the throne (after Vajiralongkorn) until the birth of Princess Bajrakitiyabha in 1978.

=== Early education ===
Sirindhorn attended kindergarten, primary and secondary school at Thailand's The Chitralada School, which was established for the children of the Royal Family and Palace staff.

She ranked first in the National School Examinations in primary level (grade 7) in 1967, in upper secondary level (grade 12) in 1972, and fourth in the National University Entrance Examination in 1975.

=== Higher education ===
In 1975 she enrolled in the faculty of arts at Chulalongkorn University and graduated with a Bachelor of Arts, first-class honours and a gold medal in history in 1976.

From 1976 she continued her studies in two graduate programs concurrently, obtaining a Master of Arts in Oriental Epigraphy (Sanskrit and Cambodian) in 1980 and also archaeology from Silpakorn University in 1980. From October 1977, she studied Sanskrit in Bangkok for two years under the tutelage of Sanskrit scholar Satya Vrat Shastri. In 1978, she obtained a Master of Arts in Pali and Sanskrit from Chulalongkorn University.

In 1981 she enrolled in a doctoral program at Srinakharinwirot University, and was awarded a PhD in developmental education in 1987.

In 1984 she earned a certificate from the Asian Regional Remote Sensing Training Centre at the Asian Institute of Technology where she studied for two months.

In April 2001 she won a scholarship in Chinese culture at Peking University in China where she studied the course for a month.

== Later life ==
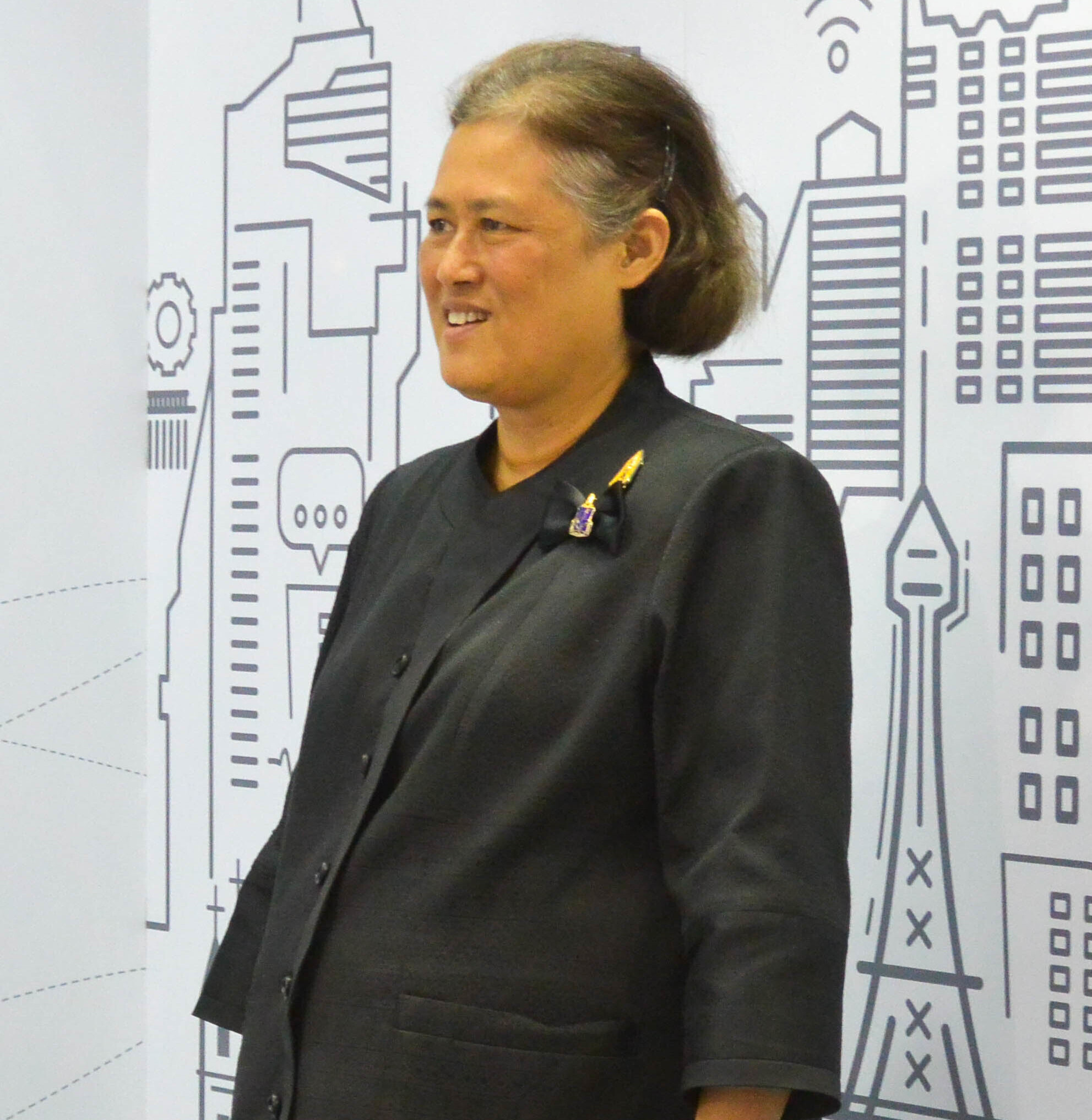
Sirindhorn in 2016

In December 2012, Sirindhorn was briefly hospitalised to remove calcium deposits.

More popular among the Thai public than her brother, then-Crown Prince Vajiralongkorn, Sirindhorn was long rumoured to be a potential successor to the Thai throne. Upon Bhumibol's death in 2016, the crown passed to Vajiralongkorn, now King Rama X. In 2019, she was bestowed the highest of royal ranks by appointment, Krom Somdej Phra, by King Vajiralongkorn. She also received a first-class King Rama X Royal Cypher Medal.

In January 2021, Sirindhorn was hospitalized after breaking both her ankles.

== Works and interests ==
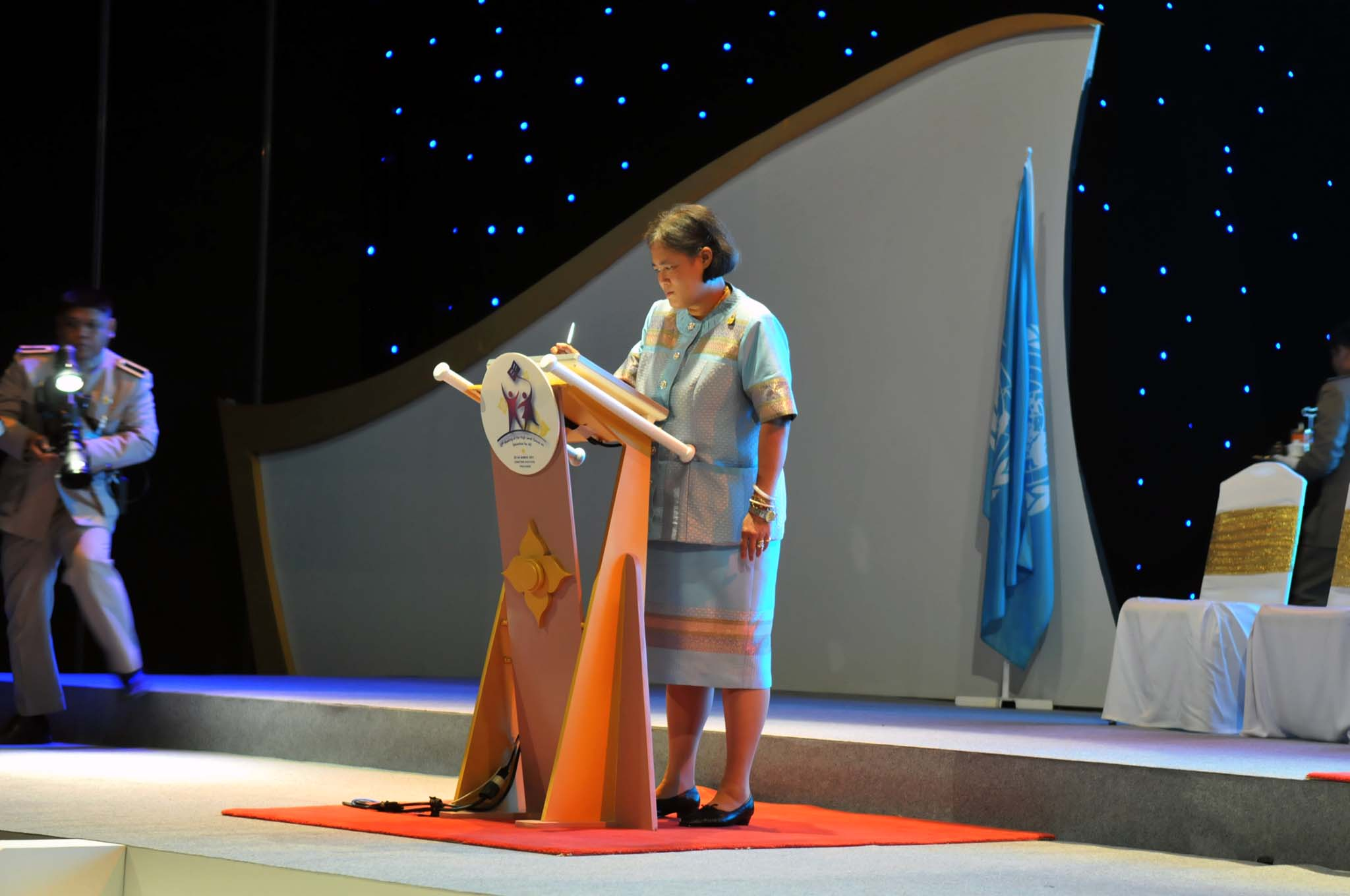
Princess Sirindhorn in 2011

Aside from her passion for technology, she holds degrees in history and a doctorate in educational development. She teaches at the history department of the Chulachomklao Royal Military Academy, where she is the nominal head of the department. In addition to Thai, she speaks fluent English, French and Mandarin Chinese, and is currently studying German and Latin. She translates Chinese literature into Thai.

She is also a performer and promoter of Thai traditional music.

Like her father Bhumibol Adulyadej, Princess Sirindhorn holds a certificate as a radio amateur, with her call sign being HS1D.

== Scholarship ==
The University of Liverpool introduced a scholarship in honour of Sirindhorn. One full scholarship will be awarded annually to enable a Thai student to study at Liverpool to complete a one-year taught Masters programme. The scholarship is open to all subjects in which a one-year taught Masters programme is offered; however, priority will be given to those students who wish to study in a subject area associated with Princess Sirindhorn such as science, information technology, medicine, the arts, geography, history and languages. To be eligible for the scholarship, applicants must be a Thai national and already hold an offer to study a one-year taught Masters programme at the University of Liverpool.

== Honours and awards ==
=== Military rank ===
- General, Admiral and Air Chief Marshal

=== Volunteer Defense Corps of Thailand rank ===
- Volunteer Defense Corps General

=== Academic rank ===
- Professor of Chulachomklao Royal Military Academy
- Professor of Srinakharinwirot University
- Honorary Degree of Doctor from University of Singapore

==== Foreign honours ====
- Algeria: Achir of the National Order of Merit
- Austria: Grand Cross of the Order of Honour for Services to the Republic of Austria
- Bulgaria: First Class of the Order of the Balkan Mountains
- China: Recipient of the Order of Friendship
- Croatia: Grand Order of Queen Jelena
- Denmark: Grand Cross of the Order of the Dannebrog
- Iceland: Grand Cross of the Order of the Falcon
- India: Padma Bhushan
- Laos: National Gold Medal
- Lithuania: Grand Cross of the Order of Order of Vytautas the Great
- South Korea: Grand Cross of the Order of Diplomatic Service Merit
- Malaysia: Honorary Grand Commander of the Order of Loyalty to the Crown of Malaysia
- Mongolia: Grand Cross of the Order of the Polar Star
- Pakistan: Grand Cross of the Order of the Crescent of Pakistan
- Peru: Grand Cross of the Order of the Sun of Peru
- Spain: Knight Grand Cross of the Order of Isabella the Catholic
- Sweden: Member Grand Cross of the Royal Order of the Seraphim
- United Kingdom: Honorary Grand Cross of the Royal Victorian Order
- Tonga
  - Knight Grand Cross of the Royal Order of the Crown of Tonga
  - Knight Grand Cross of the Royal Order of Pouono

=== Awards ===
- Austria: International Union of Nutritional Sciences Award
- China: Chinese Language and Culture Friendship Award
- (China) Chinese Literature Foundation of Chinese Writers Association: Understanding and Friendship International Literature Award
- India: Indira Gandhi Prize
- Philippines: Ramon Magsaysay Award for Public Service

==== Honorary degrees ====
National

- (Thailand) Chiang Mai University: Geography
- (Thailand) Chiang Mai University: Thai language
- (Thailand) Asian Institute of Technology: Technology

Foreign

- China:
  - Hong Kong – Lingnan University: Doctor of Letters
  - Hong Kong – The University of Hong Kong: Doctor of Letters
  - Peking University: Chinese language
- Japan – Tokai University: Engineering
- Philippines – University of the Philippines Los Baños: Law
- Singapore - National University of Singapore
- United States:
  - California – Pomona College: Doctor of Humane Letters
  - Indiana – Indiana University Bloomington: Doctor of Humane Letters
  - Illinois – Northern Illinois University: Doctor of Humane Letters
  - Maryland – Johns Hopkins University: Doctor of Humane Letters
  - Massachusetts – Bay Path University: Doctor of Humane Letters

==== Honorary titles ====
- China: People’s Friendship Ambassador
- United Nations: Special Ambassador of the World Food Programme for School Feeding
- UNESCO: UNESCO Goodwill Ambassador for "Empowerment of Minority Children through Education and through the Preservation of Their Intangible Cultural Heritage"

== Titles and symbols ==
Styles of: Princess Sirindhorn (1955–present); Princess Royal (1977–present); Princess Debaratana Rajasuda (2019–present)
- Reference style: Her Royal Highness
- Spoken style: Your Royal Highness

His Majesty King Bhumibol Adulyadej, on the occasion of his 50th birthday, conferred the titles of Somdej Phra, the highest rank of prince or princess, and Maha Chakri, meaning "The Great Chakri", on Princess Sirindhorn.

The royal announcement was made at the Amarin Vinichai Throne Hall on 5 December 1977. On 28 December, a ceremony was held at the Government House to celebrate the new title. In addition to the new title, the Princess received her own royal standard, along with honorary commissions in the army, navy and air force.

Royal monogram of Princess Maha Chakri Sirindhorn

Royal flag of Princess Maha Chakri Sirindhorn

== Eponyms ==
=== Institutions ===
==== National ====
A number of academic and research institutions in Thailand are named after her:

- Princess Sirindhorn's College, Mueang Nakhon Pathom, Nakhon Pathom Province.
- Princess Maha Chakri Sirindhorn Anthropology Centre
- Mahachakri Sirindhorn and Boromrajkumari Building, Faculty of Arts, Chulalongkorn University, Bangkok.
- Somdech Phra Debaratana Medical Center, Ramathibodi Hospital, Bangkok.
- Princess Maha Chakri Sirindhorn Music Library, Mahidol University, Bangkok
- Sirindhorn International Institute of Technology (SIIT), Thammasat University, Bangkok.
- Sirindhorn International Thai-German Graduate School of Engineering (TGGS), King Mongkut's Institute of Technology North Bangkok.
- Princess Maha Chakri Sirindhorn Natural History Museum, natural history museum, Faculty of Science, Prince of Songkla University, Hat Yai Campus, Hat Yai, Songkhla Province.
- Sirindhorn Observatory, Chiang Mai University, Doi Suthep, Chiang Mai Province.
- Princess Sirindhorn Neutron Monitor, a Galactic cosmic ray detector at Thailand's highest mountain, Doi Inthanon, Chiang Mai Province.
- Princess Maha Chakri Sirindhorn Medical Center, Srinakharinwirot University, Onkarak Campus, Nakhon Nayok Province
- Sirindhorn Chinese Language and Culture Center at Mae Fah Luang University, which was a gift from China and named in honor of Sirindhorn's role in Thailand-China cultural exchange.

==== Foreign ====
- Sirindhorn Technology and Culture Exchange Center, Peking University, Haidian District, Beijing, China.
- Mianyang Xianfenglu Sirindhorn Primary School, Mianyang, Sichuan, China.

=== Places ===
- Sirindhorn MRT station of the Bangkok MRT Blue Line
- Amphoe Sirindhorn of Ubon Ratchathani Province
- Sirindhorn Dam stops the Dom Noi River in Sirindhorn, Ubon Ratchathani Province.
- Sirindhorn Museum (Phu Kum Khao Dinosaur Museum), Phu Kum Khao Dinosaur Research Center, Sahatsakhan, Kalasin Province.
- Sirindhorn Observatory, Department of Physics, Faculty of Science, Chiang Mai University
- Princess Sirindhorn Stadium, is a sports stadium in Si Racha, Chonburi Province.
- Princess Sirindhorn Wildlife Sanctuary, the largest protected peat swamp forest in Thailand is located in Narathiwat Province.

=== Fauna ===
Several fauna species are named after her, including:

- Eurochelidon sirintarae (Princess Sirindhorn bird or white-eyed river martin), a critically endangered swallow first described in 1968.
- Phricotelphusa sirindhorn (panda crab). It was described in Crustaceana in 1989.
- Phuwiangosaurus sirindhornae, a sauropod herbivore dinosaur from the Early Cretaceous period. It was described in 1994.
- Sirindhorna khoratensis, a hadrosauroid dinosaur from the Early Cretaceous. It was described in 2015.
- Acanthosquilla sirindhorn (panda mantis shrimp). It was described in Crustaceana in 1995.
- Tarsius sirindhornae, an ancient primate.
- Streptocephalus sirindhornae, a freshwater fairy shrimp. It was described in the Journal of Crustacean Biology in 2000.
- Macrobrachium sirindhorn, a freshwater prawn. It was described in Crustaceana in 2001.
- Trigona sirindhornae, a bee.
- Sirindhorn thailandiensis (princess moth).
- Sirindhornia pulchella, a moth
- Loxosomatoides sirindhornae, a freshwater kamptozoan. It was described in Hydrobiologia in 2005.
- Aenictus shilintongae Jaitrong & Schultz, 2016, an ant.
- Camponotus sirindhornae Jaitrong, Jantarit & Pitaktunsakul, 2025, an ant.
- Tetraponera sirindhornae Yodprasit, Tasen & Jaitrong, 2025, an ant.
- Oligoaeschna sirindhornae Ngiam & Orr, 2017
- Chironephthya sirindhornae Imahara, Chavanich, Viyakarn, Kushida, Reimer & Fujita, 2020

=== Flora ===
Numerous plant species have been named after her:

- Sirindhornia spp., orchids:
  - Sirindhornia pulchella can only be seen in Doi Chiang Dao National Park, blooming from April to June.
  - Sirindhornia mirabilis can only be seen in Doi Hua Mot in Tak Province, blooming during May and June.
  - Sirindhornia monophyla can be seen in Doi Hua Mot in Tak Province from March to June, as well in Myanmar and China.
- Other plant species include:
  - Peperomia sirindhorniana Suwanph. & Chantar, 2016
  - Phanera sirindhorniae (sam sip song pra dong), a vine of the pea family. It was described in the Nordic Journal of Botany in 1997.
  - Magnolia sirindhorniae (Princess Sirindhorn's magnolia)
  - Thepparatia scandens Phuph. or Khruea thepparat malvaceae. Thepparat is a part of her royal title. It was described in the Thai Forest Bulletin (Botany) in 2006.
  - Impatiens sirindhorniae Triboun & Suksathan, 2009. It was described in Gardens' Bulletin Singapore.
  - Chayamaritia sirindhorniana D. J. Middleton, Tetsana & Suddee. The species is endemic to Loei Province.
  - Buxus sirindhorniana W.K.Soh, von Sternb., Hodk. & J.Parn, 2014.
  - Flemingia sirindhorniae Mattapha, Chantar. & Suddee, 2017.

== Notes ==
Sirindhorn, the Princess Royal House of Mahidol Cadet branch of the House of Chakri Born: 2 April 1955
Thai royalty
New creation	Princess Royal of Thailand; 1977–present	Incumbent
Lines of succession
Preceded by Princess Sirivannavari	Line of succession to the Thai throne 3rd in line	Succeeded by The Princess Srisavangavadhana
Order of precedence
Preceded by The Queen	Thai order of precedence The Princess Royal; 3rd position	Succeeded by The Princess Srisavangavadhana
Non-profit organization positions
Vacant Kasrt Snidvongs (acting) Title last held by Sukhumabhinanda	Vice President of Thai Red Cross Society; 1977–present	Incumbent
Awards and achievements
Preceded by Lakshmi Chand Jain	Recipient of the Ramon Magsaysay Award for Public Service; 1991	Succeeded by Angel Alcala
Preceded by Kofi Annan	Recipient of the Indira Gandhi Prize; 2004	Succeeded by Hamid Karzai
