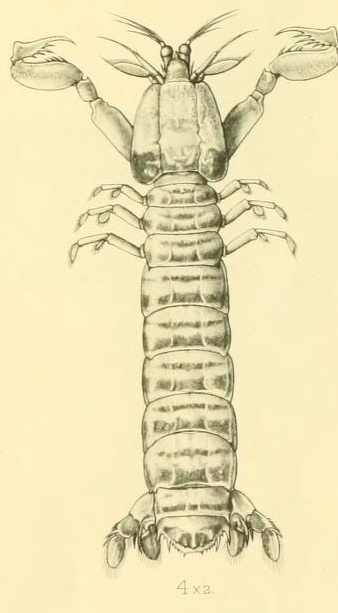
- A. multifasciata
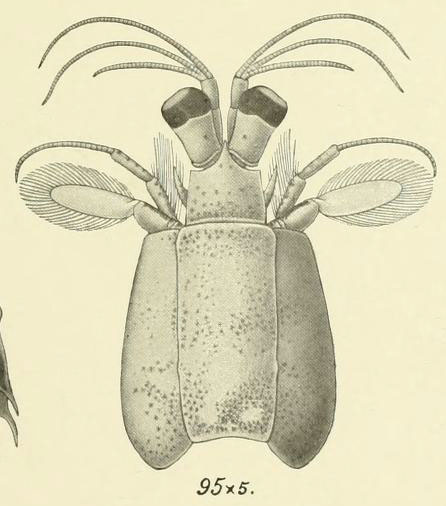
- A. tigrina, carapace and anterior appendages

Scientific classification
- Kingdom: Animalia
- Phylum: Arthropoda
- Class: Malacostraca
- Order: Stomatopoda
- Family: Nannosquillidae
- Genus: Acanthosquilla; Manning, 1963

Type species
- Lysiosquilla multifasciata Wood-Mason, 1895

= Acanthosquilla =

Genus of crustaceans

Acanthosquilla is a genus of stomatopod crustacean. The American carcinologist Raymond B. Manning named and first circumscribed the genus in 1963. As of 2018, the World Register of Marine Species recognizes the following eight species:

- A. crosnieri Ahyong, 2002
- A. derijardi Manning, 1970
- A. manningi Makarov, 1979
- A. melissae Ahyong, 2008
- A. multifasciata (Wood-Mason, 1895)
- A. multispinosa Blumstein, 1974
- A. tigrina (Nobili, 1903)
- A. wilsoni Moosa, 1973
