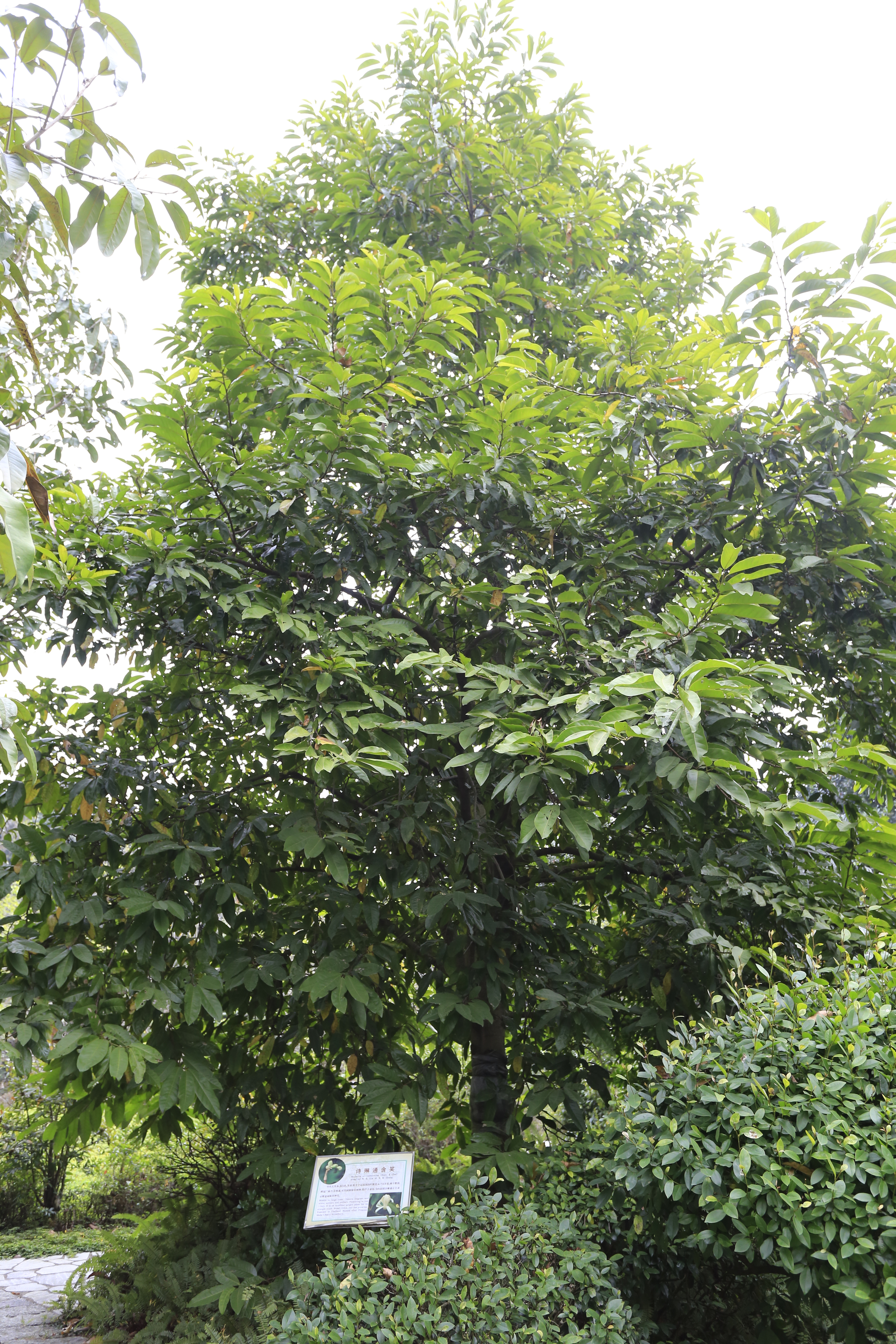

Conservation status
- Endangered (IUCN 3.1)

Scientific classification
- Kingdom: Plantae
- Clade: Embryophytes
- Clade: Tracheophytes
- Clade: Spermatophytes
- Clade: Angiosperms
- Clade: Magnoliids
- Order: Magnoliales
- Family: Magnoliaceae
- Genus: Magnolia
- Subgenus: Magnolia subg. Yulania
- Section: Magnolia sect. Michelia
- Subsection: Magnolia subsect. Michelia
- Species: M. sirindhorniae

Binomial name
- Magnolia sirindhorniae Noot. & Chalermglin

Synonyms
- Michelia sirindhorniae (Noot. & Chalermglin) N.H.Xia & X.H.Zhang

= Magnolia sirindhorniae =

Species of flowering plant

Magnolia sirindhorniae is a plant species in the genus Magnolia, family Magnoliaceae, described by Hans Peter Nooteboom and Piya Chalermglin.

It is a magnolia species endemic to swamp forest of central Thailand in Tha Luang District, Lopburi Province. It was named in honor of Princess Maha Chakri Sirindhorn.
