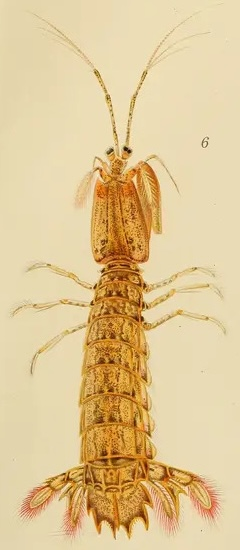
- Rissoides desmaresti, 1910 illustration

Scientific classification
- Kingdom: Animalia
- Phylum: Arthropoda
- Clade: Pancrustacea
- Class: Malacostraca
- Order: Stomatopoda
- Family: Squillidae
- Genus: Rissoides
- Species: R. desmaresti

Binomial name
- Rissoides desmaresti (Risso, 1816)

Synonyms
- Meiosquilla desmaresti; Squilla desmaresti

= Rissoides desmaresti =

Species of crustacean

Rissoides desmaresti is a species of mantis shrimp native to the eastern Atlantic Ocean and Mediterranean Sea.

== Distribution ==
R. desmaresti is one of only two species of stomatopod found around the British Isles, and one of twelve species in the Mediterranean. It is relatively common in the Mediterranean, and is found along the European coast as far as the British Isles, although it has not been recorded off the coast of West Africa. Around Great Britain, there have been a few observations from the English Channel and North Wales, but the only place where significant numbers are known to occur is on a 25-hectare (62-acre) site east of Saint Tudwal's Islands in Tremadog Bay. Its occurrence there may be related to warm currents coming from the Bay of Biscay and the sheltered nature of the area.

== Description ==
R. desmaresti has a dorso-ventrally flattened body and may reach a size of 70 millimetres (2.8 in). The carapace is small and is only fused to the first two segments of the thorax. R. demsaresti is distinguished from the other British species, Platysquilla eusebia, by the number of spines on the last segment of the raptorial claw; R. desmaresti has five spines, while P. eusebia has a dozen or more. It lives in burrows below from the subtidal zone down to depths of around 40 metres (130 ft).

== Etymology ==
The specific epithet "desmaresti" commemorates Anselme Gaëtan Desmarest, while the generic name Rissoides commemorates Antoine Risso.
