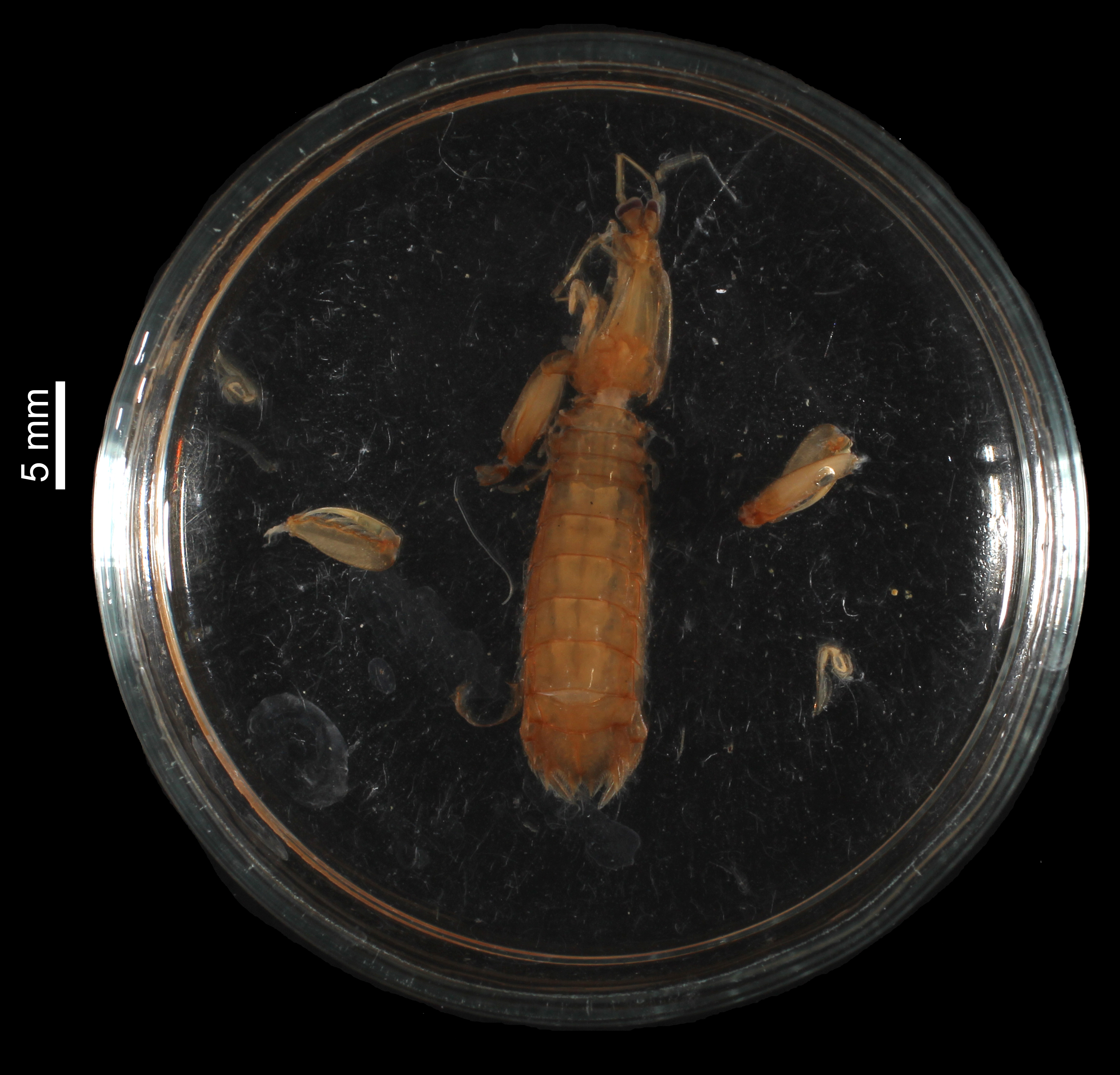
- Rissoides africanus

Scientific classification
- Domain: Eukaryota
- Kingdom: Animalia
- Phylum: Arthropoda
- Class: Malacostraca
- Order: Stomatopoda
- Family: Squillidae
- Genus: Rissoides; Manning & Lewinsohn, 1982

Type species
- Squilla desmaresti Risso, 1816

= Rissoides =

Genus of crustaceans

Rissoides is a genus of mantis shrimp. It is named after Antoine Risso, and includes the following species:

- Rissoides africanus (Manning, 1974)
- Rissoides barnardi (Manning, 1975)
- Rissoides calypso (Manning, 1974)
- Rissoides desmaresti (Risso, 1816)
- Rissoides pallidus (Giesbrecht, 1910)
