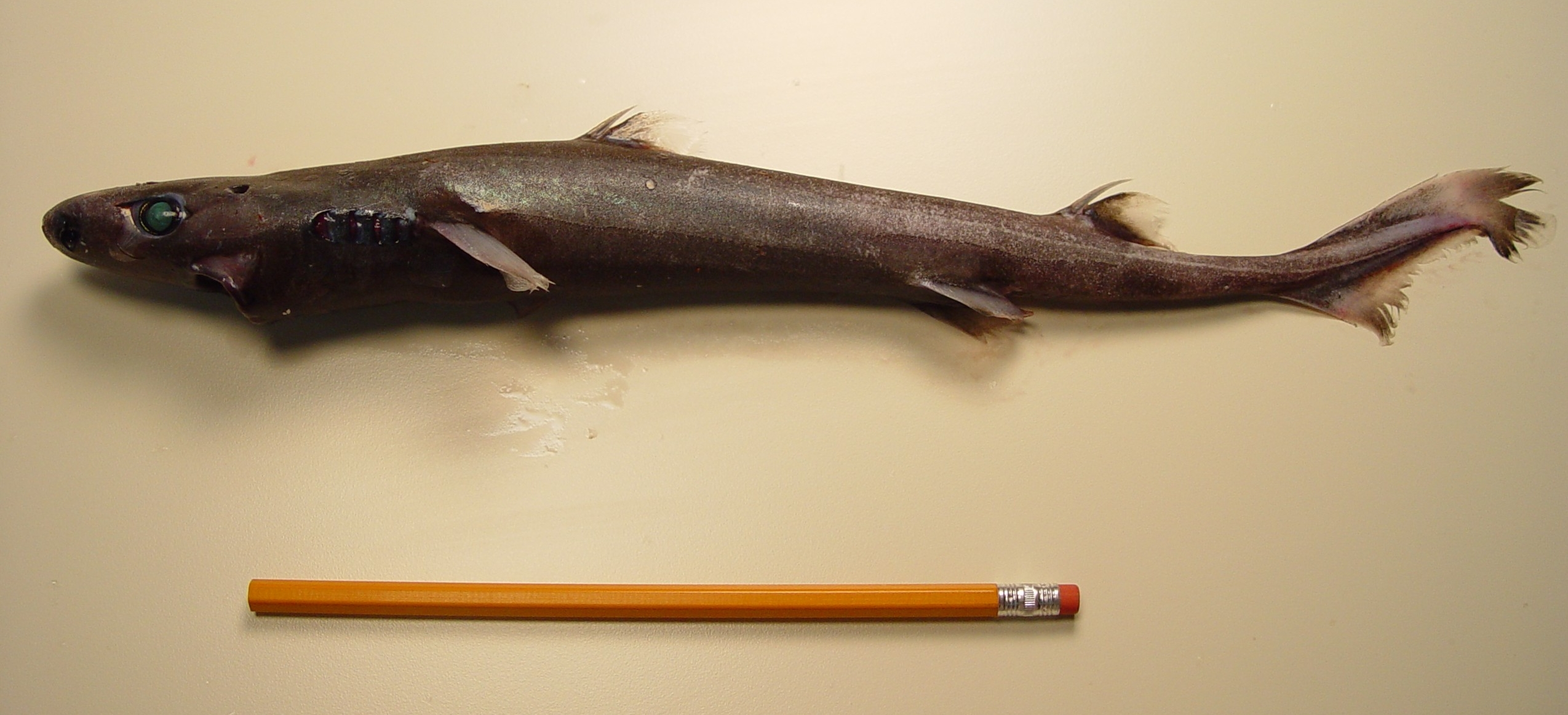

Conservation status
- Least Concern (IUCN 3.1)

Scientific classification
- Kingdom: Animalia
- Phylum: Chordata
- Class: Chondrichthyes
- Subclass: Elasmobranchii
- Division: Selachii
- Order: Squaliformes
- Family: Etmopteridae
- Genus: Etmopterus
- Species: E. pusillus

Binomial name
- Etmopterus pusillus (R. T. Lowe, 1839)
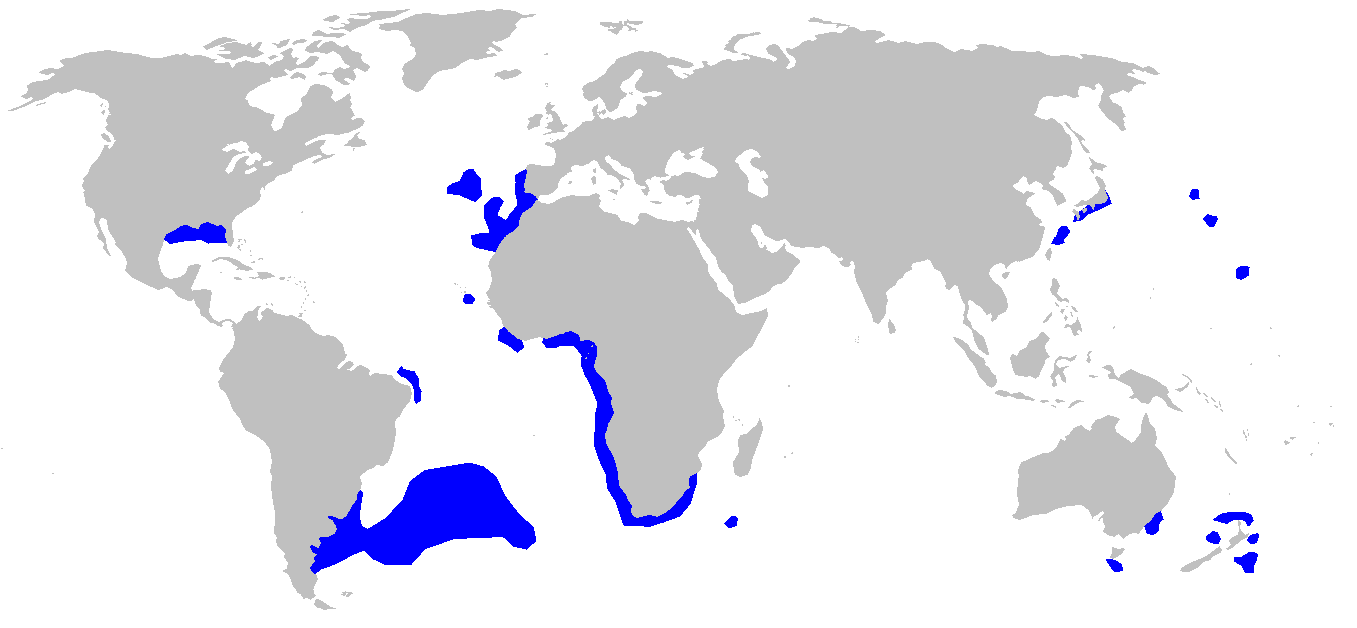
- Range of the smooth lanternshark

Synonyms
- Acanthidium pusillum Lowe, 1839; Centrina nigra Lowe, 1834; Etmopterus frontimaculatus Pietschmann, 1907

= Smooth lanternshark =

Species of shark

The smooth lanternshark or slender lanternshark (Etmopterus pusillus) is a species of dogfish shark in the family Etmopteridae, found widely in the Atlantic and Pacific Oceans. It inhabits benthic environments at a depth of 274–1,000 m (899–3,281 ft), and pelagic environments at a depth of 0–708 m (0–2,323 ft). The smooth lanternshark forms a species group with the larger blurred lanternshark (E. bigelowi), both of which are distinguished from other members of their family by small, irregularly arranged dermal denticles with a truncated shape. This species has a slender, dark brown body with an indistinct black band on the sides over the pelvic fins, and reaches 50 cm (20 in) in length. This slow-growing, ovoviviparous shark feeds on smaller squid, fishes, and fish eggs. Smooth lanternsharks are often caught as bycatch in eastern Atlantic and Japanese commercial fisheries. The International Union for Conservation of Nature (IUCN) has evaluated this species as of Least Concern because of its wide distribution and limited threats.

== Taxonomy and phylogeny ==
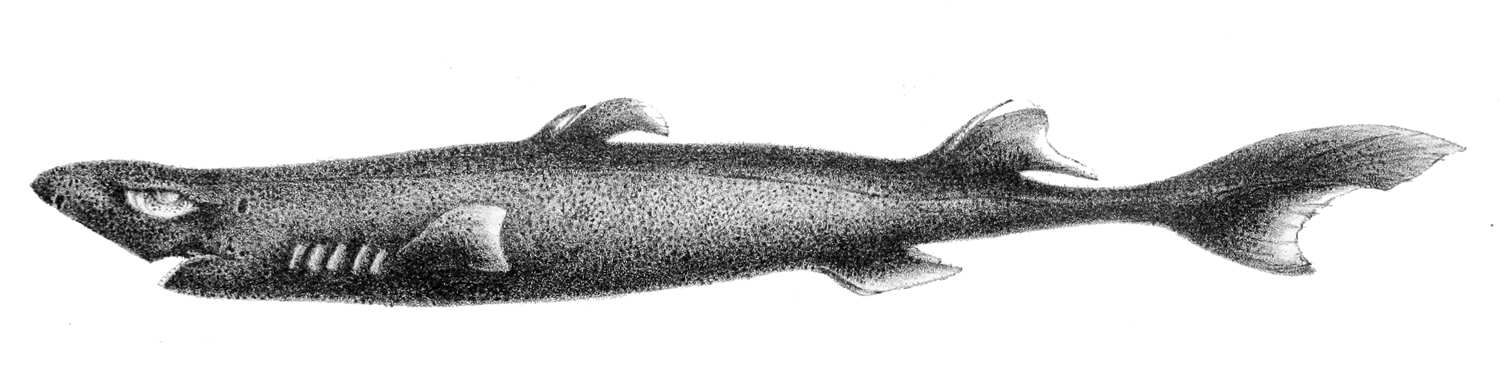
Early illustration of a smooth lanternshark, from A history of the fishes of Madeira (1843).

The first scientific description of the smooth lanternshark, as Acanthidium pusillum, was published by British biologist Richard Thomas Lowe, in an 1839 issue of the scientific journal Transactions of the Zoological Society of London. This species was later moved to the genus Etmopterus. The specific epithet pusillus means "weak" in Latin. The smooth lanternshark forms a species group with the blurred lanternshark (E. bigelowi); these two species are distinguished from other lantern sharks by their irregularly arranged, truncated (ending in a flat crown as though the tip were cut off) dermal denticles.

== Distribution and habitat ==
In the Atlantic Ocean, the smooth lanternshark occurs from the Gulf of Mexico to Argentina in the west, Portugal to South Africa (including Cape Verde and the Azores) in the east, and on the Mid-Atlantic Ridge. In the Indian Ocean, it is found off KwaZulu-Natal and Madagascar. In the Pacific Ocean, it has been reported from the East China Sea to southern Japan, in the Hawaiian–Emperor seamount chain area, off Australia and New Zealand, and over the Nazca Plate (including the Amber Seamount and off Isla Salas y Gómez).

Smooth lanternsharks are usually found on or near the bottom on continental and insular shelves and slopes at depths of 274–1,000 m (899–3,281 ft), and possibly to as deep as 1,998 m (6,555 ft). Catch data off southern Portugal suggest this species has a preference for rocky substrates, and may conduct a diel vertical migration. In the South Atlantic, this shark also inhabits the open ocean from the surface to a depth of 708 m (2,323 ft). It has been observed swimming over fields of hydrothermal vents.

== Description ==
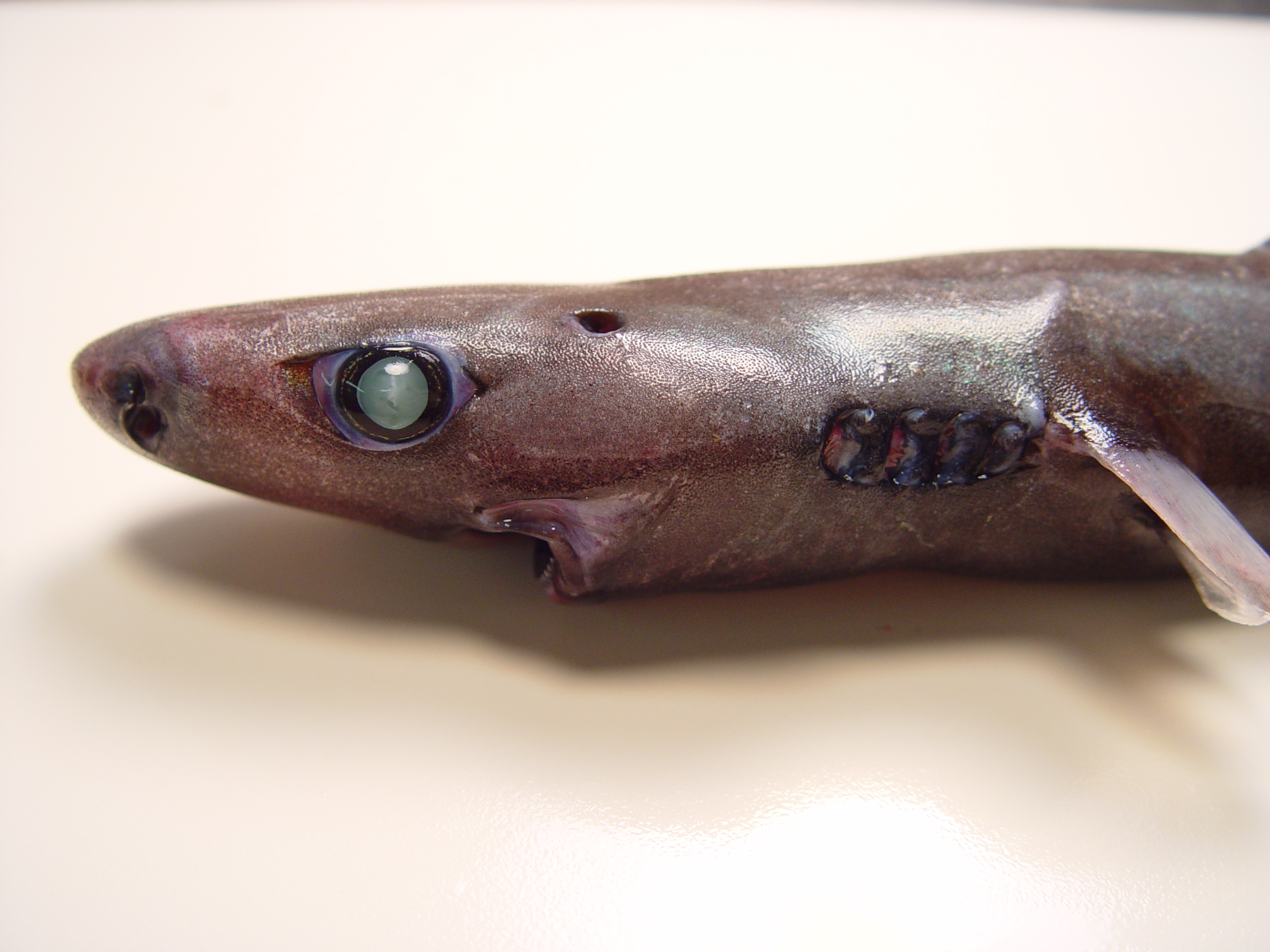
The smooth lanternshark has a bulbous snout and large oval eyes.

Lightly built, the smooth lanternshark has a large head with a pointed snout, large oval eyes, and nostrils with short anterior skin flaps. There are 22–31 tooth rows in the upper jaw and 30–53 tooth rows in the lower jaw. Each upper tooth has a narrow smooth-edged central cusp flanked by 1–2 tiny cusplets; mature males over 38 cm (15 in) long grow additional pairs of lateral cusplets with age. The lower teeth are smooth, knife-like, and angled, with their bases interlocking to form a continuous cutting surface. The five pairs of gill slits are long.

The first dorsal fin bears a stout spine in front and originates over the free rear tips of the rounded pectoral fins. The second dorsal fin is much larger than the first and has a longer spine. The pelvic fins are low and angular, and there is no anal fin. The caudal fin is short and broad, with a well-developed lower lobe and a ventral notch near the tip of the upper lobe. The skin is covered by many widely spaced, small blocky denticles not arranged in regular rows, giving it a smooth appearance. The coloration is a uniform dark brown, with a faint black mark over the bases of the pelvic fins extending both forward and backward on the flank. The smooth lanternshark is very similar to but smaller than the blurry lanternshark, attaining a length of 50 cm (20 in). The two species differ in a number of anatomical characteristics, but can be most reliably distinguished by the number of turns in their spiral valve intestines (10–13 in E. pusillus versus 16–19 in E. bigelowi).

== Biology and ecology ==
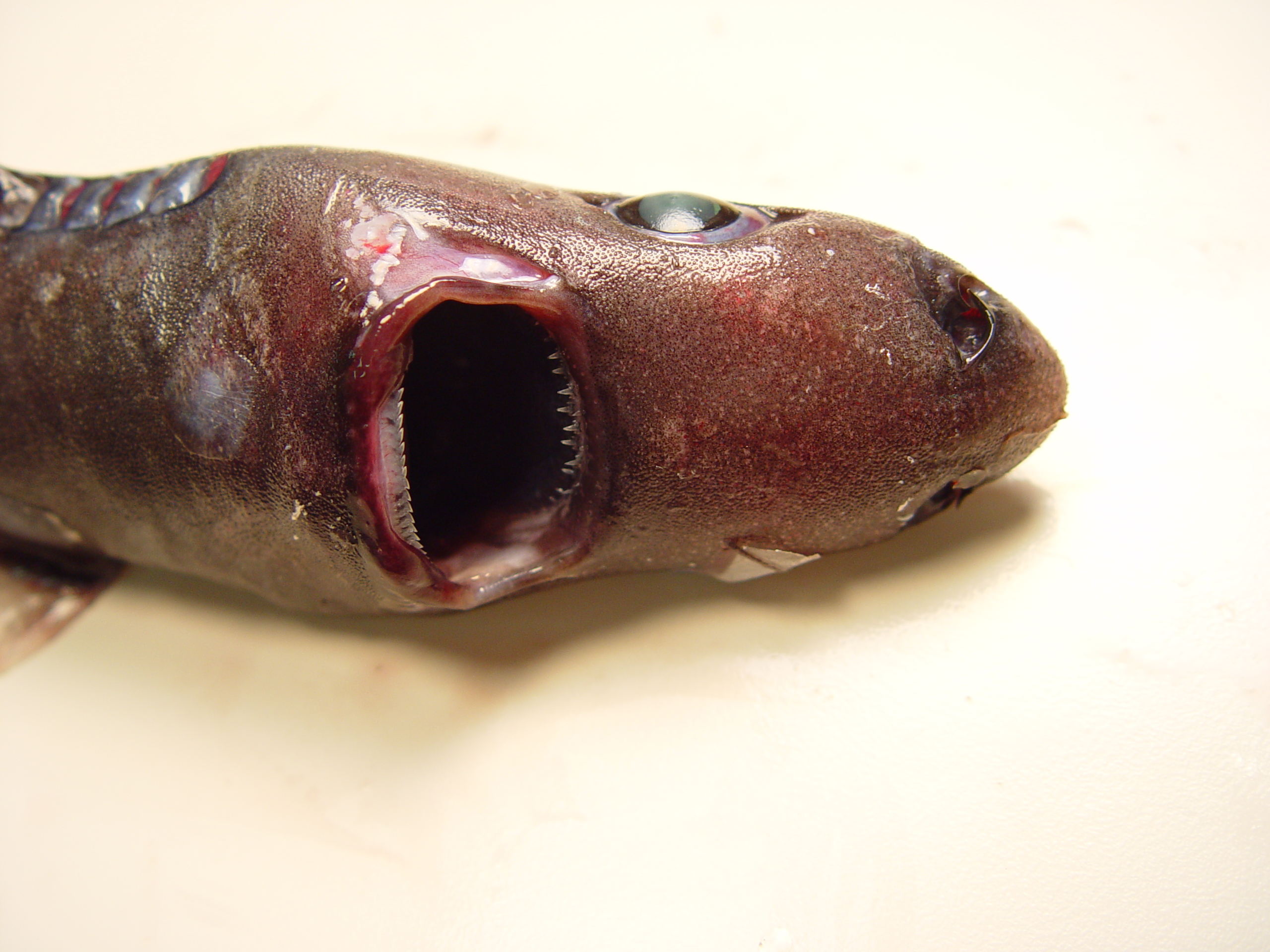
Adult smooth lanternsharks have sexually dimorphic upper teeth.

The smooth lanternshark feeds on squid, lanternfishes, smaller dogfish sharks, and fish eggs, as well as crustaceans and fish. This species is ovoviviparous, with the developing embryos being sustained by a yolk sac. Females produce an average of 10 young per reproductive cycle. Males reach sexual maturity at a length of 31–39 cm (12–15 in), and females at a length of 38–47 cm (15–19 in). The length at maturity varies with geographical region, with sharks in the western Atlantic maturing larger than those from off KwaZulu-Natal. This species grows at a slow rate, with the body becoming relatively longer with age. Off southern Portugal, males live to at least 13 years of age, and females to at least 17 years.

== Human interactions ==
Large numbers of smooth lanternsharks, predominantly juvenile, are caught incidentally by commercial longline fisheries, and to a lesser extent in bottom trawls and fixed bottom nets, in the eastern Atlantic and off Japan. This species is one of the three most common sharks caught as bycatch in deepwater fisheries off southern Portugal, along with the velvet belly lanternshark (E. spinax) and the blackmouth catshark (Galeus melastomus). Most captured smooth lanternsharks are discarded, although some may be sold dried and salted for human consumption or processed into fishmeal. The smooth lanternshark's slow rates of reproduction and growth may render it vulnerable to population collapse under sustained fishing pressure. However, catch rates currently show no evidence of this occurring, which, coupled with the smooth lanternshark's wide geographic range, has led to the IUCN assessing it as of Least Concern. In June 2018 the New Zealand Department of Conservation classified the smooth lanternshark as "At Risk – Naturally Uncommon" with the qualifiers "Data Poor" and "Secure Overseas" under the New Zealand Threat Classification System.
