= Lotharella =

Scientific classification
- Domain: Eukaryota
- Clade: Sar
- Clade: Rhizaria
- Phylum: Cercozoa
- Subphylum: Filosa
- Class: Chlorarachniophyceae
- Order: Chlorarachniales
- Family: Chlorarachniaceae
- Genus: Lotharella; Ishida and Hara in Ishida, Nakayama & Hara 1996

Type species
- Lotharella globosa (Ishida & Hara) Ishida & Hara 1996

Species
- Lotharella globosa; Lotharella oceanica; Lotharella polymorpha; Lotharella reticulosa; Lotharella vacuolata

Genus of chlorarachniophytes

Lotharella is a genus of chlorarachid alga that includes five species. It is the only genus in the family Lotharellidae.
