= Buxus sirindhorniana =

Scientific classification
- Kingdom: Plantae
- Clade: Tracheophytes
- Clade: Angiosperms
- Clade: Eudicots
- Order: Buxales
- Family: Buxaceae
- Genus: Buxus
- Species: B. sirindhorniana

Binomial name
- Buxus sirindhorniana W.K.Soh, von Sternb., Hodk. & J.Parn.

Species of flowering plant

Buxus sirindhorniana is a species of shrub or tree in the family Buxaceae. It is native to northern Thailand. The species is shrubby, and has greenish flowers. It was described in 2014, and named after the Thai royal Sirindhorn.

== Taxonomy ==
The species was first described in 2014, based on material from herbarium specimens.

== Distribution ==
Buxus sirindhorniana is native to the subtropical biome of northern Thailand. It is found in Chiang Mai province, Lampang province, and Tak province, and has been collected from protected areas.

It grows on limestone, at elevations from 775–1,525 metres (2,543–5,003 ft).

== Description ==
Buxus sirindhorniana is a shrub or small tree, that grows to 8 metres (26 ft) tall. The bark is cracked, and whitish in colour. The leaves are leathery in texture, and long and tapering in shape. The leaves are 1.5–2.8 centimetres (0.59–1.10 in) wide, and 7.5–13 centimetres (3.0–5.1 in) long. The leaf stem is 0.5–1 centimetre (0.20–0.39 in) long.

The flowers are greenish, and borne on stalks. The fruits ripen from dark green to dark purple, are spherical in shape, and 5 millimetres (0.20 in) in diameter. The fruit is thought to break open when mature.

Buxus sirindhorniana was the first member of the genus Buxus known to always have two sets of female reproductive organs (carpels). Each carpel has two seeds, which are oblong in shape.

The species flowers in July, November, and December. It fruits in January, February, June, July, November, and December.

== Etymology ==
The species is named for Princess Sirindhorn of Thailand, in recognition of her advocacy for biological conservation in Thailand.
