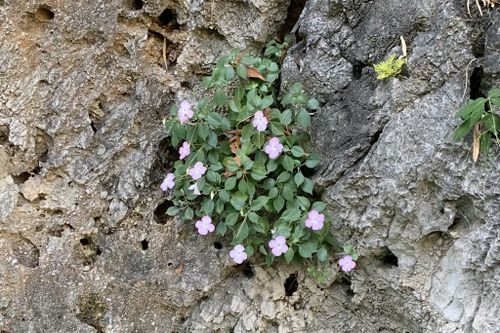

Scientific classification
- Kingdom: Plantae
- Clade: Tracheophytes
- Clade: Angiosperms
- Clade: Eudicots
- Clade: Asterids
- Order: Ericales
- Family: Balsaminaceae
- Genus: Impatiens
- Species: I. sirindhorniae

Binomial name
- Impatiens sirindhorniae Triboun & Suksathan

= Impatiens sirindhorniae =

Species of flowering plant

Impatiens sirindhorniae is a species of flowering plant in the family Balsaminaceae. The species grows on cliffs in Thailand. It is a perennial herb with purple flowers.

Impatiens sirindhorniae was described in 2009, and named after Sirindhorn.

== Distribution ==
Impatiens sirindhorniae is native to the dry tropical biome of Thailand. It grows on vertical limestone cliffs, at elevations of 20–150 metres (66–492 ft).

== Taxonomy ==
Impatiens sirindhorniae was described in 2009, based on specimens collected in 2007. The type specimens were collected in Thailand's Plai Phraya district, at an elevation of 20–150 metres (66–492 ft).

== Description ==
Impatiens sirindhorniae is a perennial herb. It has up to fifteen grey-brown stems, which may grow horizontally along the ground. The stems are up to 40 centimetres (16 in) long, and hairless.

The leaves, which are arranged in a spiral, grow on 6–7.5 centimetres (2.4–3.0 in) long stems. The leaves measure 3.2–4 centimetres (1.3–1.6 in) long, and 2.8–3.5 centimetres (1.1–1.4 in) wide. They are greyish-green, leathery, and ovate in shape. The leaf margins have teeth.

Impatiens sirindhorniae has light purple flowers, which are usually solitary. The flower stalks are 3–6.5 centimetres (1.2–2.6 in) long. The plant flowers in the rainy season (June to October). The seeds are elliptical.

== Etymology ==
Impatiens sirindhorniae is named after the Thai Princess Sirindhorn, recognising her contributions to conservation.
