= Sirindhornia chaipattana =

Scientific classification
- Kingdom: Animalia
- Phylum: Arthropoda
- Class: Insecta
- Order: Lepidoptera
- Family: Tortricidae
- Genus: Sirindhornia
- Species: S. chaipattana

Binomial name
- Sirindhornia chaipattana Pinkaew & Muadsub, 2014

Species of moth

Sirindhornia chaipattana is a species of moth of the family Tortricidae. It is found in Thailand. The habitat consist of secondary forests.

The length of the forewings is about 5.2 mm for males and 4.9–5.3 mm for females.
