= Platysquilla =

Scientific classification
- Domain: Eukaryota
- Kingdom: Animalia
- Phylum: Arthropoda
- Class: Malacostraca
- Order: Stomatopoda
- Family: Nannosquillidae
- Genus: Platysquilla; Manning, 1967

Species
- Platysquilla enodis Platysquilla eusebia Platysquilla horologii

Genus of crustaceans

Platysquilla is a genus of mantis shrimp erected in 1967 by Raymond Manning for species previously included in Lysiosquilla.
