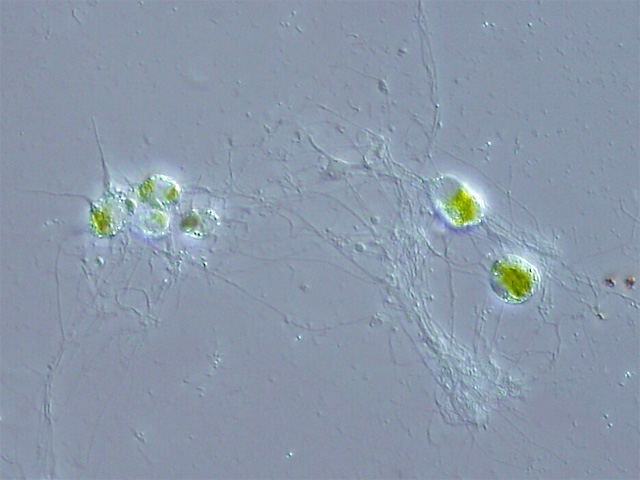
- Chlorarachnion reptans

Scientific classification
- Domain: Eukaryota
- Clade: Sar
- Clade: Rhizaria
- Phylum: Cercozoa
- Subphylum: Filosa
- Class: Chlorarachniophyceae; Hibberd & Norris 1984

Subgroups
- Chlorarachnida; Chlorarachniidae; Gymnochloridae"; Lotharellidae; Cryptochlora; Minorisida; Minorisidae; Incertae sedis; Rhabdamoeba

Synonyms
- Chlorarachnea Hibberd & Norris 1984; Chlorarachniophyta Hibberd & Norris 1984

= Chlorarachniophyte =

Chlorarachniophytes

Group of cercozoans

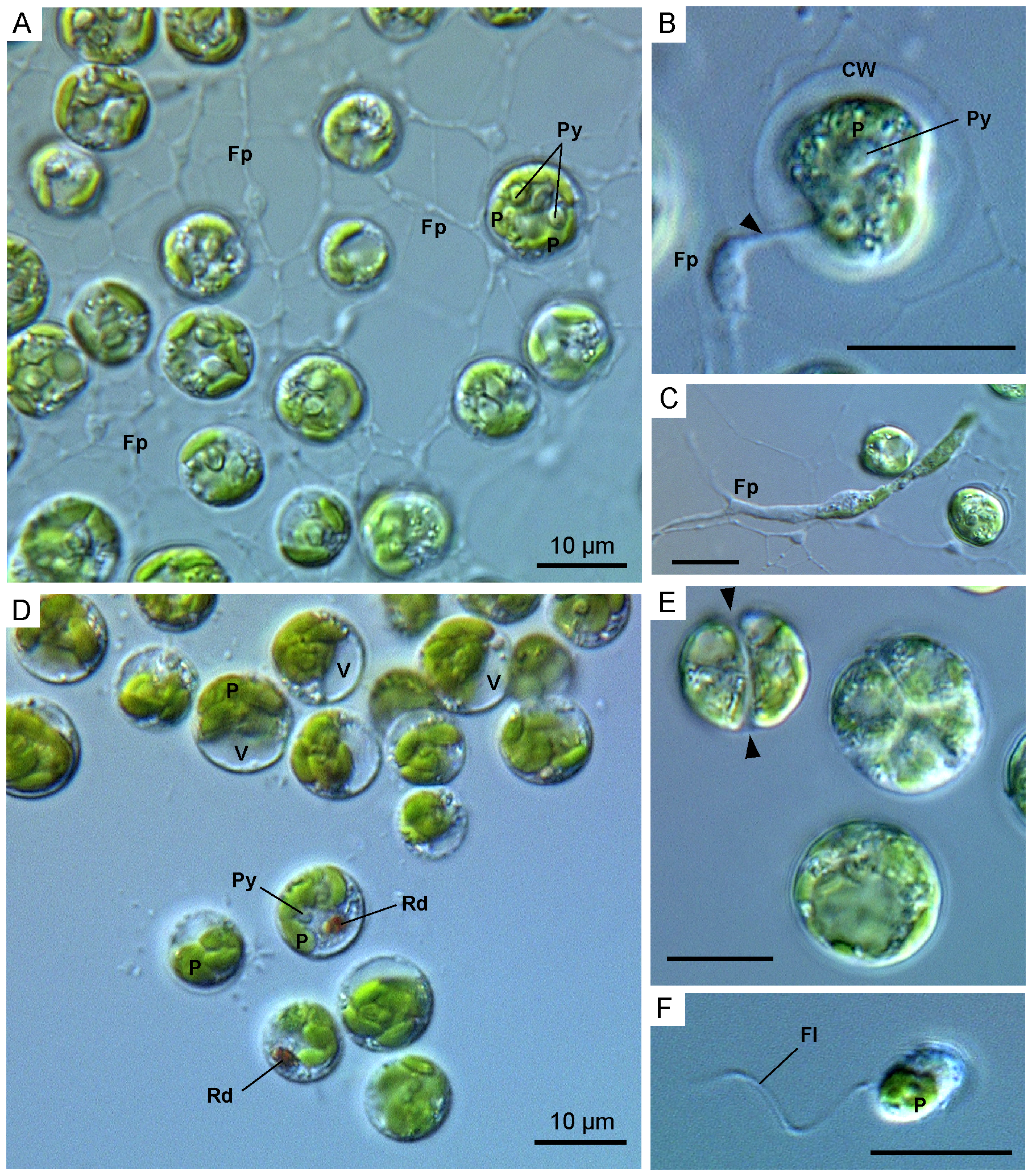
A cultured chlorarachniophyte, Lotharella globosa LEX01 strain

The chlorarachniophytes are a small group of exclusively marine cercozoans widely distributed in tropical and temperate waters. They are typically mixotrophic, ingesting bacteria and smaller protists as well as conducting photosynthesis. Normally they have the form of small amoebae, with branching cytoplasmic extensions that capture prey and connect the cells together, forming a net. These extensions are dependent on the presence of light and polymerization of the actin cytoskeleton. They may also form flagellate zoospores, which characteristically have a single subapical flagellum that spirals backwards around the cell body, and walled coccoid cells.

The chloroplasts were presumably acquired by ingesting some green alga. They are surrounded by four membranes, the outermost of which is continuous with the endoplasmic reticulum, and contain a small nucleomorph between the middle two, which is a remnant of the alga's nucleus. This contains a small amount of DNA and divides without forming a mitotic spindle. The origin of the chloroplasts from green algae is supported by their pigmentation, which includes chlorophylls a and b, and by genetic similarities. The only other groups of algae other than chlorarachnids contain nucleomorphs are a few species of dinoflagellates, which also have plastids originating from green algae, and the cryptomonads, which acquired their chloroplasts from a red alga.

The chlorarachniophytes only include five genera, which show some variation in their life-cycles and may lack one or two of the stages described above. Genetic studies place them among the Cercozoa, a diverse group of amoeboid and amoeboid-like protozoa.

The chlorarachniophytes were placed before in the order Rhizochloridales, class Xanthophyceae (e.g., Smith, 1938), as algae, or in order Rhizochloridea, class Xanthomonadina (e.g., Deflandre, 1956), as protozoa.

So far sexual reproduction has only been reported in two species; Chlorarachnion reptans and Cryptochlora perforans.

== Morphology ==
Representation of a Chlorarachniophyte: 1. Filopodium; 2. Extrusomes; 3. Mitochondrion, creates ATP (energy) for the cell (flat cristae); 4. Capping vesicle; 5. Golgi apparatus, modifies proteins and sends them out of the cell; 6. Nucleomorph; 7. Plastid membranes (4, secondary green); 8. Stacked thylakoid, site of the light-dependent reactions of photosynthesis; 9. Pyrenoid, center of carbon fixation; 10. Globules; 11. Endoplasmic reticulum, the transport network for molecules going to specific parts of the cell; 12. Nucleolus; 13. Nucleus; 14. Prey in phagosome; 15. Digestive vacuole

== Phylogeny ==
Based on Shiratori et al. 2024.

- Chlorarachnea Chlorarachniophyceae
  - - - Chlorarachnida Chlorarachniales/Chlorarachniaceae
        - - Gymnochloridae"
            - - Amorphochlora amoebiformis
              - Viridiuvalis adhaerens
            - - Gymnochlora dimorpha
              - Gymnochlora stellata
        - - Lotharellidae
            - Lotharella globosa
            - - Lotharella oceanica
              - - Lotharella reticulosa
                - Lotharella vacuolata
          - - "Chlorarachniidae"
              - Partenskyella glossopodia
              - - Chlorarachnion reptans
                - - Norrisiella sphaerica
                  - - Bigelowiella natans
                    - Bigelowiella longifila
    - Minorisida Minorisidae
      - Minorisa minuta
      - - Minorisa fusiformis
        - - Minorisa megafusiformis
          - Minorisa magna
  - Rhabdamoeba marina

== Taxonomy ==
- Class Chlorarachnea Hibberd & Norris 1984 [Chlorarachnea Cavalier-Smith 1998; Chlorarachniophyta Hibberd & Norris 1984; Chlorarachnia Cavalier-Smith 1993]
  - Order Chlorarachnida Ishida et al. 1996 [Chlorarachniida Hibberd & Norris 1984]
    - Family Chlorarachniidae Ishida et al. 1996
      - Genus Bigelowiella Moestrup 2001
        - Species B. longifila Shuhei, Kunihiko & Kenichiro 2007 [Lotharella scrobiculata Ishida & Hara 1993, nom. inval.]
        - Species B. natans Moestrup 2001
      - Genus Chlorarachnion Geitler 1930
        - Species Chlorarachnion reptans Geitler 1930
      - Genus Norrisiella Ota, Ueda & Ishida 2007
        - Species Norrisiella sphaerica Ota, Ueda & Ishida 2007
      - Genus Partenskyella Ota et al. 2009
        - Species Partenskyella glossopodia Ota et al. 2009
    - Genus Cryptochlora Calderon-Saenz & Schnetter 1987
      - Species Cryptochlora perforans Calderon-Saenz & Schnetter 1987
    - Family Gymnochloridae Cavalier-Smith in Cavalier-Smith, Chao & Lewis 2018
      - Genus Gymnochlora Ishida et al. 1996
        - Species G. dimorpha Ota 2011
        - Species G. stellata Ishida et al. 1996
      - Genus Amorphochlora Ishida, Yabuki & Ota 2011
        - Species Amorphochlora amoebiformis (Ishida & Hara 1996) Ishida, Yabuki & Ota 2011 [Lotharella amoeboformis Ishida & Hara 1996]
      - Genus Viridiuvalis T.Shiratori, S.Fujita, T.Shimizu & K.Ishida 2017
        - Species Viridiuvalis adhaerens T.Shiratori, S.Fujita, T.Shimizu & K.Ishida 2017
    - Family Lotharellidae Cavalier-Smith in Cavalier-Smith, Chao & Lewis 2018
      - Genus Lotharella Ishida et al. 1996
        - Species L. polymorpha Dietz et al. 2003
        - Species L. vacuolata Ota & Ishida 2005
        - Species L. oceanica Ota 2009
        - Species L. reticulosa Ohta 2012
        - Species L. globosa (Ishida & Hara 1994) Ishida et al. 1996 [Chlorarachnion globosum Ishida & Hara 1994]
  - Order Minorisida Cavalier-Smith 2018
    - Family Minorisidae Cavalier-Smith 2018
      - Genus Minorisa Del Campo 2013
        - Species Minorisa minuta Del Campo 2013
  - Incertae sedis
    - Genus Rhabdamoeba Dunkerly 1921
      - Species Rhabdamoeba marina Dunkerly 1921
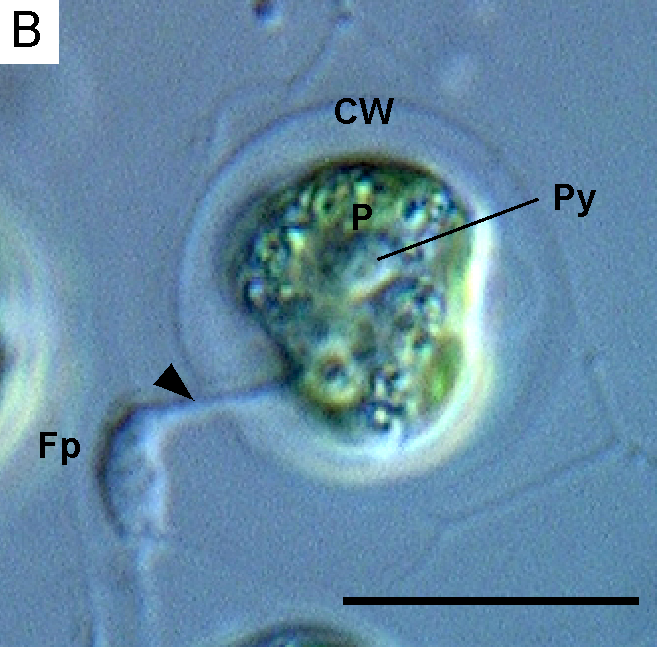
Lotharella globosa extending a filopodium (Fp) through a pore of the cell wall (CW) from a walled amoeboid cell. Py: pyrenoid.
Scale bar = 10 μm

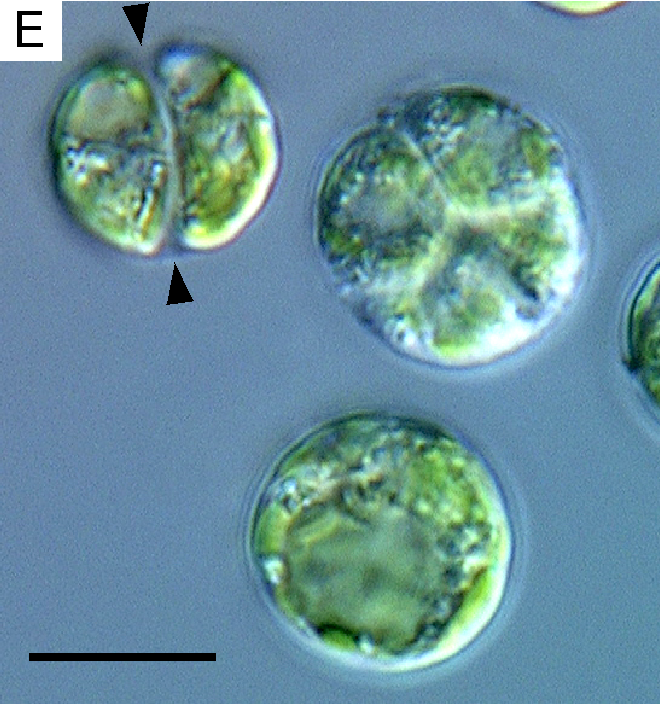
Binary and quaternary cell divisions of Lotharella globosa. Arrowheads indicate the parental cell wall.
Scale bar = 10 μm

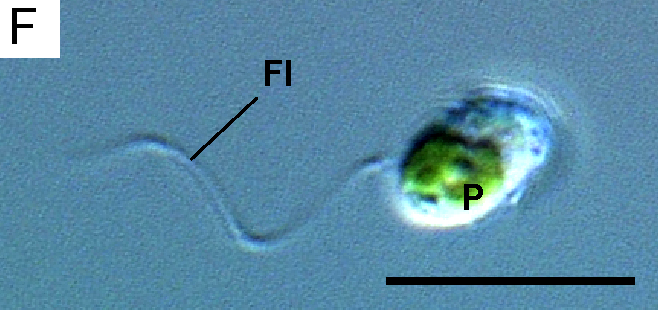
Flagellate cell of Lotharella globosa with a single flagellum (Fl) and plastid (P)
Scale bar = 10 μm
