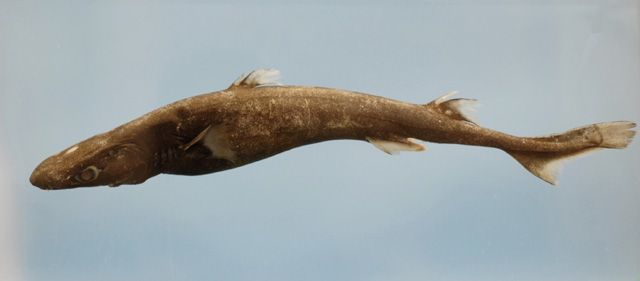

Conservation status
- Least Concern (IUCN 3.1)

Scientific classification
- Kingdom: Animalia
- Phylum: Chordata
- Class: Chondrichthyes
- Subclass: Elasmobranchii
- Division: Selachii
- Order: Squaliformes
- Family: Etmopteridae
- Genus: Etmopterus
- Species: E. bigelowi

Binomial name
- Etmopterus bigelowi Shirai & Tachikawa, 1993
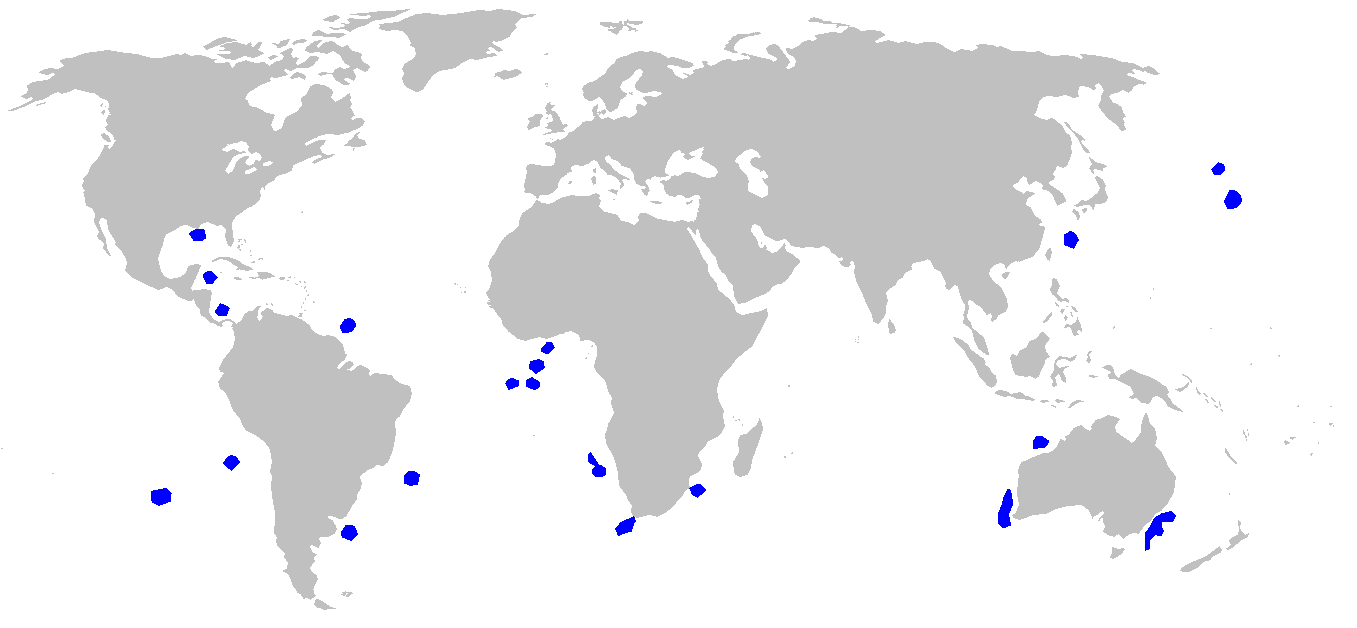
- Occurrences of the blurred lanternshark

= Blurred lanternshark =

Species of shark

The blurred lanternshark (Etmopterus bigelowi) is a little-known species of dogfish shark in the family Etmopteridae, found around the world in benthic and pelagic habitats from a depth of 110 m (360 ft) to over 1 km (0.62 mi) down. This shark forms the E. pusillus species group with the smooth lanternshark, which are distinguished from other members of its family by having irregularly arranged, flat-topped dermal denticles that give them a "smooth" appearance. Both species are slender-bodied with long heads, two dorsal fins bearing spines, no anal fins, and light-emitting photophores. The blurred lanternshark is larger, reaching 67 cm (26 in) or more in length. This species feeds on small squid, fishes, and fish eggs, and is ovoviviparous. It has been assessed as of Least Concern by the International Union for Conservation of Nature, because of its wide distribution and lack of threat from fishing pressure.

== Taxonomy and phylogeny ==
Japanese ichthyologists Shigeru Shirai and Hiroyuki Tachikawa described the blurred lanternshark in a 1993 article in the scientific journal Copeia, as part of a taxonomic revision of the Etmopterus pusillus species group. Shirai and Tachikawa found that the species group comprises the smooth lanternshark (E. pusillus) and a hitherto unrecognized second species, which they named E. bigelowi in honor of Henry B. Bigelow (who, along with William C. Schroeder and Stewart Springer, first described the blurred lanternshark in 1955, but did not see it as being separate from E. pusillus). The E. pusillus species group is distinguished from other lanternsharks in having truncate (ending in a flat crown as though the tip were cut off), irregularly arranged dermal denticles. This species may also be referred to as the smooth lanternshark or the blurred smooth lanternshark.

== Distribution and habitat ==
Blurred lanternsharks have been caught around the world over continental and insular shelves and slopes, submarine ridges, and seamounts. In the Atlantic Ocean, it is known from the Gulf of Mexico to Argentina, and off western and southern Africa. In the Indo-Pacific, it has been reported from off Okinawa and Australia, as well as on the Emperor and Hancock Seamounts in the central North Pacific and over the Nazca Plate off Peru. It is partially pelagic and occurs at depths of 110–700 m (360–2,300 ft) in open water, and from 163 m (535 ft) to over 1 km (0.62 mi) near the bottom. Like many other lantern sharks, adults are found deeper than juveniles.

== Description ==
Growing to a length of at least 67 cm (26 in), the blurred lanternshark has a slender body, large head, and short tail. The snout is wedge-shaped and slightly flattened, tapering to a point. The nostrils are large, with short flaps of skin in front. The eyes are oval in shape with a deep anterior notch in the orbit. The mouth has long furrows at the corners that extend halfway to the first of five gill slits. There are 19–24 tooth rows in the upper jaw, each with a narrow central cusp flanked by 2–4 pairs of smaller cusplets, increasing in number with age in males over 45 cm (18 in) long. There are 25–39 tooth rows in the lower jaw, each tooth with a smooth-edged, knife-like cusp and their bases interlocked to form a single cutting surface; the teeth of males over 43 cm (17 in) long and females over 35 cm (14 in) long become more erect with age.

The first dorsal fin is close to the pectoral than the pelvic fins, and bear a straight, grooved spine in front. The second dorsal fin is half again as tall as the first and bears a longer, curved spine. The pectoral fins are rounded at the tips, with the distance between them and the medium-sized, angular pelvic fins about equal to the distance between the dorsal fins. The anal fin is absent. The caudal peduncle is narrow, leading to a caudal fin with a well-developed lower lobe and a broad upper lobe with a ventral notch near the tip. The small, blocky dermal denticles are densely but irregularly arranged, each with a flat, truncate crown. The coloration is brown or gray above, with a pale spot over the pineal gland, and black below extending in faint markings over the sides of the head, under the pectoral fins, over the pelvic fins, and below the caudal peduncle. Like other lanternsharks, the blurred lanternshark possesses a species-specific light-emitting photophores, which are not placed in prominent bands. The blurred lanternshark is very similar to the smooth lanternshark, but is larger and can be reliably differentiated by the number of turns in the spiral valve intestine (16–19 versus 10–13).

== Biology and ecology ==
The diet of the blurred lanternshark consists of squid, smaller dogfish sharks, lanternfishes, and fish eggs. Reproduction is ovoviviparous, with developing embryos being sustained by a yolk sac and being born live at a length of 16 cm (6.3 in). Males attain sexual maturity at around 31–39 cm (12–15 in) long, and females at 38–47 cm (15–19 in) long.

== Human interactions ==
Blurred lanternsharks are harmless and of no commercial significance, but may be caught and discarded by deepwater fisheries. Because of its wide distribution and the lack of evidence for heavy fishing mortality, the IUCN has assessed this species as of Least Concern.
