= Sirindhornia (moth) =

Scientific classification
- Kingdom: Animalia
- Phylum: Arthropoda
- Class: Insecta
- Order: Lepidoptera
- Family: Tortricidae
- Subfamily: Olethreutinae
- Tribe: Enarmoniini
- Genus: Sirindhornia; Pinkaew & Muadsub, 2014

Genus of moths

Sirindhornia is a genus of moths belonging to the subfamily Olethreutinae of the family Tortricidae.

== Species ==
- Sirindhornia bifida Pinkaew & Muadsub, 2014
- Sirindhornia chaipattana Pinkaew & Muadsub, 2014
- Sirindhornia curvicosta Pinkaew & Muadsub, 2014
- Sirindhornia pulchella Pinkaew & Muadsub, 2014

== See also ==
- List of Tortricidae genera
