= Sirindhornia pulchella =

Scientific classification
- Kingdom: Animalia
- Phylum: Arthropoda
- Class: Insecta
- Order: Lepidoptera
- Family: Tortricidae
- Genus: Sirindhornia
- Species: S. pulchella

Binomial name
- Sirindhornia pulchella Pinkaew & Muadsub, 2014

Species of moth

Sirindhornia pulchella is a species of moth of the family Tortricidae. It is found in Thailand. The habitat consist of evergreen forests.

The length of the forewings is 4.8–5 mm for males and 4.5 mm for females.

== Etymology ==
The species name refers to the wing pattern and color and is derived from Latin pulchella (meaning beautiful).
