= Bigelowina =

Scientific classification
- Domain: Eukaryota
- Kingdom: Animalia
- Phylum: Arthropoda
- Class: Malacostraca
- Order: Stomatopoda
- Family: Nannosquillidae
- Genus: Bigelowina; Schotte & Manning, 1993

Genus of crustaceans

Bigelowina is a genus of crustaceans belonging to the family Nannosquillidae. The genus was first described in 1993 by Marilyn Schotte and Ray Manning.

The species of this genus are found in the coasts of America, India, Australia.

Species:

- Bigelowina biminiensis (Bigelow, 1893)
- Bigelowina phalangium (Fabricius, 1798)
- Bigelowina septemspinosa (Miers, 1881)
