= Bigelowiella =

Scientific classification
- Domain: Eukaryota
- Clade: Sar
- Clade: Rhizaria
- Phylum: Cercozoa
- Subphylum: Filosa
- Class: Chlorarachniophyceae
- Order: Chlorarachniales
- Family: Chlorarachniaceae
- Clade: Chlorarachniidae
- Genus: Bigelowiella; Moestrup, 2001

Type species
- Bigelowiella natans Moestrup, 2001

Species
- Bigelowiella longifila Shuhei, Kunihiko & Kenichiro, 2007; Bigelowiella natans Moestrup, 2001

Genus of single-celled organisms

Bigelowiella is a genus of chlorarachniophyte algae, containing a secondary plastid within a reduced cytoplasmic compartment that contains a vestigial nucleomorph.

== Introduction ==
Bigelowiella is a genus of mixotrophic flagellated chlorarachniophytes first described in 2001 following its discovery in 1991. Like all chlorarachniophytes, Bigelowiella has a secondary plastid derived from a green alga, and retains a reduced nucleus from this endosymbiont in the form of a nucleomorph. These features make Bigelowiella an important model for research on the evolutionary processes of endosymbiosis and consequences for endosymbiont nuclei. Bigelowiella is noticeably distinguished from other chlorarachniophytes by the presence of a distinct flagellate form during which division has been observed. Although flagella are present in other chlorarachniophytes, such as the well described species Chlorarachnion reptans, division doesn't typically occur in these stages. Various other stages are present in cells of Bigelowiella, and descriptions of these stages are consistent with the claim that Bigelowiella represents a planktonic lineage of chlorarachniophytes. Bigelowiella presently consists of two described species: B. natans and B. longifila. Due to B. natans' growing status as a model organism, most research describing Bigelowiella is specific to the type species. Descriptions of ecological, genetic, and biochemical features of this genus are inferred from research on B. natans.

== Etymology ==
Bigelowiella is named after Bigelow Laboratory, Maine, U.S.A., where it was discovered.

== History of knowledge ==
Bigelowiella was first described by Moestrup & Sengco at the Provasoli-Guillard National Center for Culture of Marine Phytoplankton at Bigelow Laboratory. Cultures initially thought to contain the green algae Pedinomonas spp. were identified as amoeboflagellates of the class Chlorarachniophyceae. One strain from these cultures, designated as CCMP 621, was investigated using sequencing and electron microscopy, and was described as Chlorarachnion sp. before being classified into the new genus and species. Light microscopy and TEM were used to characterize the organism and classify the holotype from the type species B. natans. Following the description of the novel genus, a second species, B. longifila, was described. B. longifila is distinguished from B. natans primarily by its amoeboid form, during which division involves unequal inheritance of filopodia and unique migration of cell contents.

== Habitat and ecology ==
Bigelowiella is inferred to be a planktonic lineage within the chlorarachniophytes, as supported by its vegetative flagellated form, a feature not seen in other chlorarachniophytes. Additionally, specimens have been found exclusively from the open ocean, where colonies of amoeboid stages remain suspended in the water. The light response in B. natans has been investigated through analysis of transcriptional changes, revealing strong diurnal regulatory control - a feature that is essential for organisms navigating the varying light conditions in the water column. However, the role of Bigelowiella in planktonic food webs, nutrient cycling, and carbon sequestration remains to be quantified.

One important ecological factor is Bigelowiella's mixotrophic nature. Mixotrophy involves the facultative use of photosynthesis and phagotrophy as sources of carbon and energy, and allows organisms to shift between these processes in order to best suit their environment. B. natans preys on the abundant marine cyanobacterium Synnecoccocus. This ability suggests B. natans has a significant role in the marine food web, connecting primary producers to higher trophic levels. The consequences of complementary heterotrophy in B. natans have been further assessed by growth rate comparisons with exclusively heterotrophic marine flagellates of similar size. Greater growth rates were observed in B. natans than the heterotrophic counterparts, suggesting that a competitive advantage is gained by mixotrophy. A more holistic investigation into the trade-offs incurred by a mixotrophic strategy is required for better understanding of the use of mixotrophy in Bigelowiella.

Environmental DNA (eDNA) sampling has shown that B. natans is found in tropical and temperate marine systems globally, with water temperatures greater than 17 °C, relatively low macronutrient and phytoplankton biomass concentrations, and varying iron concentrations. In these ecosystems, this organism has been found to comprise up to 1.6% of the local phytoplankton abundance; high abundances occur in regions of iron-limitation. The presence of B. natans in iron-limited ecosystems has been accredited to the complex proteomic changes involving up- and down-regulation of proteins functioning in the iron-deficiency response. Many marine phytoplankton have evolved physiological mechanisms in order to cope with low iron availability, and the presence of such a mechanism in B. natans has likely provided a competitive advantage favouring its success in iron-limited marine ecosystems (see HNLC).

== Morphology ==
Bigelowiella is a genus of unicellular mixotrophic amoeboflagellates. Cells have two flagella extending from the anterior of the cell, with one flagellum reduced to a basal body. The plastids contain chlorophyll a and b, and are surrounded by the chloroplast envelope composed of 4 membranes. Ordered from outermost to innermost these are the phagosomal membrane, the residual plasma membrane of the secondary endosymbiotic green alga, and two membranes from the primary endosymbiotic cyanobacterium. The periplastidial compartment (PPC) is the lumen between the second and third membranes, and was the cytoplasm of the endosymbiotic green alga. Located in the PPC is a nucleomorph. In Bigelowiella the chloroplast envelope is smooth and lacks ribosomes, and is free in the cytoplasm. This contrasts with the plastidial topography of several other lineages of secondary endosymbiosis, for example the cryptophyte Guillardia theta, wherein the phagosomal membrane is continuous with the nuclear membrane.

The cells of the type species, B. natans, are described as follows. The diameter of cells is approximately 5 μm. The length of cells is 4-8 μm. The shape of cells is ovoid/spherical. The large flagellum is 9–19 μm in length, and is typically inserted near the nucleus. The short basal body is typically located near the mitochondria. The plastid is divided in two lobes and is bright-green in color, and a single yellowish pyrenoid resides between the bipartite plastid. The nucleomorph is located near the pyrenoid within the chloroplast envelope. Pseudopods of amoeboflagellate forms have been seen extending from anterior or posterior regions, or from all regions of the cell. Cells have not been observed dividing in amoeboid form. Cells occasionally encyst, defined by the presence of a thin cell wall.

B. longifila has a flagellated stage similar to that of B. natans. Amoeboid, walled-amoeboid, and coccoid stages have also been observed. Amoeboid cells are 4.6–13.8 μm wide, in a variety of shapes, and possess filopodia up to 500 μm long, 1-2 per cell. Multiple bipartite plastids are present in this stage.

== Life cycles ==
Bigelowiella is unique amongst chlorarachniophytes by the presence of a flagellated stage that undergoes division. Furthermore, the two species of Bigelowiella are distinguished primarily by differences in life stages and reproduction. Cell division only occurs in the flagellated stage of B. natans, whereas B. longifila divides in both flagellated and amoeboid stages. In B. natans, cell division involves replication of the pyrenoid, followed by the plastid and nucleomorph. The flagella of B. natans includes one short basal body and one large flagellum, which have been determined to be the no. 1 and no. 2 flagellum, respectively. Flagellar replication occurs, and pairs of flagella migrate to poles and act as centrioles. The short basal body replicates to form another short basal body, and the large flagellum shortens prior to replication to form the short basal body of the other daughter cell. The two short basal bodies produced from this division grow into the large flagella of each daughter cell. The division of the host nucleus occurs after the breakdown of the nuclear membrane; so-called open mitosis.

Division in the flagellated stage of B. longifila is inferred to occur as in B. natans. Division in the amoeboid stage results in two daughter cells, one of which inherits the long filopodia from the parent. In the hours following cytokinesis, the cytoplasmic contents are shuttled through the filopodia to the distal end, where the daughter cell then reforms. The other daughter cell will form its own filopodia.

== Nuclear genome ==
The nuclear genome of B. natans is approximately 95 Mb, with over 21,000 protein-coding genes. Encoded within this genome are most 'core eukaryotic genes', in addition to those gained from endosymbiotic transfer. 1,002 proteins are predicted to be targeted to the periplastidial compartment, many of which are spliceosome-associated and may function in splicing of the intron-replete nucleomorph genome. Interesting splicing patterns in nucleus encoded mRNA have been revealed by RNAseq data. Many different isoforms of genes have been identified, produced by various alternative splicing patterns, namely inclusion of introns and exclusion of exons. These complex alternative splicing patterns are typically only observed in multicellular organisms, and the extent of splicing is only rivalled by that of the human cerebral cortex. Notably, 246 genes were identified wherein alternative splicing can lead to modifications of targeting sequences, with consequences for cellular localization. Protein targeting is an essential step in endosymbiosis, and this suggests that alternative splicing may have been involved in generation of plastid- and periplastidial-targeting systems in chlorarachniophytes.

== Plastid genome ==
The B. natans plastid genome has been fully sequenced. The plastid genome contains 69,166 bp, which is greatly reduced when compared to the plastid genomes of extant green algae, relatives of the ancestral organism from which it was derived. This reduction is due to two factors, gene loss and compaction. B. natans' plastid is less gene rich than other photosynthetic plastids, but more gene rich than non-photosynthetic plastids. A total of 61 protein-coding genes are present in the genome. Although gene loss has occurred, the extent of gene loss is comparable to members of green algae, such as model organism Chlamydomonas reinhardtii, and other organisms with secondary plastids from green algae, like Euglena gracilis. The plastid genomes of these organisms are much larger than that of B. natans, suggesting that the small genome size is largely due to reduction of intergenic regions and introns, which are noticeably absent from the B. natans plastid genome entirely.

== Nucleomorph genome ==
The B. natans nucleomorph genome is the smallest nuclear genome known, comprising only 3 chromosomes, with a total of 372,870 bp. Within the nucleomorph genome there are 331 protein-coding genes, 17 of which are genes encoding plastid-targeted proteins. Because the nucleomorph is located in the periplastidial compartment, nucleomorph-encoded plastid-targeted proteins only have to cross 2 membranes to reach the plastid. This is contrasted with nucleus-encoded plastid-targeted proteins, which must cross a total of 4 membranes to reach the plastid. Among the genes retained, those not targeted to the plastid are used for essential functions or may not be expressed at all (i.e. pseudogenes). As in all genomes of endosymbiotic origin, the nucleomorph genome lacks many genes essential for the maintenance and function of the organelle. This shift towards reliance on the host for certain essential gene products is an important step in the transition from endosymbiont to organelle. Notably, genes transferred to the host nucleus include components of the large subunit of the ribosome (5S rRNA) and α, β, and γ tubulin. The nucleomorph encodes many (852) introns, the majority of which are <20 bp in length, termed pygmy introns.

== Biochemistry ==
Examination of biosynthetic pathways within B. natans has provided unique insight into the consequences of endosymbiosis. There are two heme biosynthesis pathways that have been identified, one derived from the heterotrophic host and one from the symbiont. The enzymes present in the pathways come from many different ancestral origins, derived from cyanobacteria of the primary plastid, the heterotrophic ancestor of green algae, and even α-proteobacteria, likely from mitochondrial pathways. Furthermore, research suggests evidence of a cryptic endosymbiosis of red algae in the chlorarachniophyte lineage, based on the presence of metabolic pathways and genetic elements of red algal ancestry. Additionally, elements of the photosynthetic apparatus show red algal ancestry, and a significant number of plastid-targeted proteins are suspected to be of red algal origin, suggesting a complex evolutionary history in the chlorarachniophytes. Further research is needed to determine whether this is due to an ancient secondary endosymbiosis, as suggested by the chromist hypothesis, or a separate case of lateral gene transfer from red algae.

== Practical importance ==
B. natans is a model organism for both the study of chlorarachniophytes and the general process of secondary endosymbiosis in general. Its nucleomorph makes it an ideal candidate to represent intermediate forms of the endosymbiotic process. The sequencing of B. natans' nucleomorph genome has elucidated many questions regarding the incorporation and reduction of genomes gained from secondary endosymbiotic events, and has consequences extending beyond the chlorarachniophytes, pertaining to the evolution of ancestral plastid-bearing protists. Cavalier-Smith proposed the Cabazoan hypothesis, which suggested that a single endosymbiosis event, the engulfment of a green alga, led to the origin of euglenids and chlorarachniophytes. However, phylogenetic analysis following the sequencing of the B. natans chloroplast genome refutes the hypothesized monophyletic group of the green algae symbionts in chlorarachniophytes and euglenids, and provides evidence for independent secondary endosymbiosis of green algae in these lineages. This exemplifies the basal phylogenetic relationships that can be determined with research into unique lineages such as the chlorarachniophytes.
