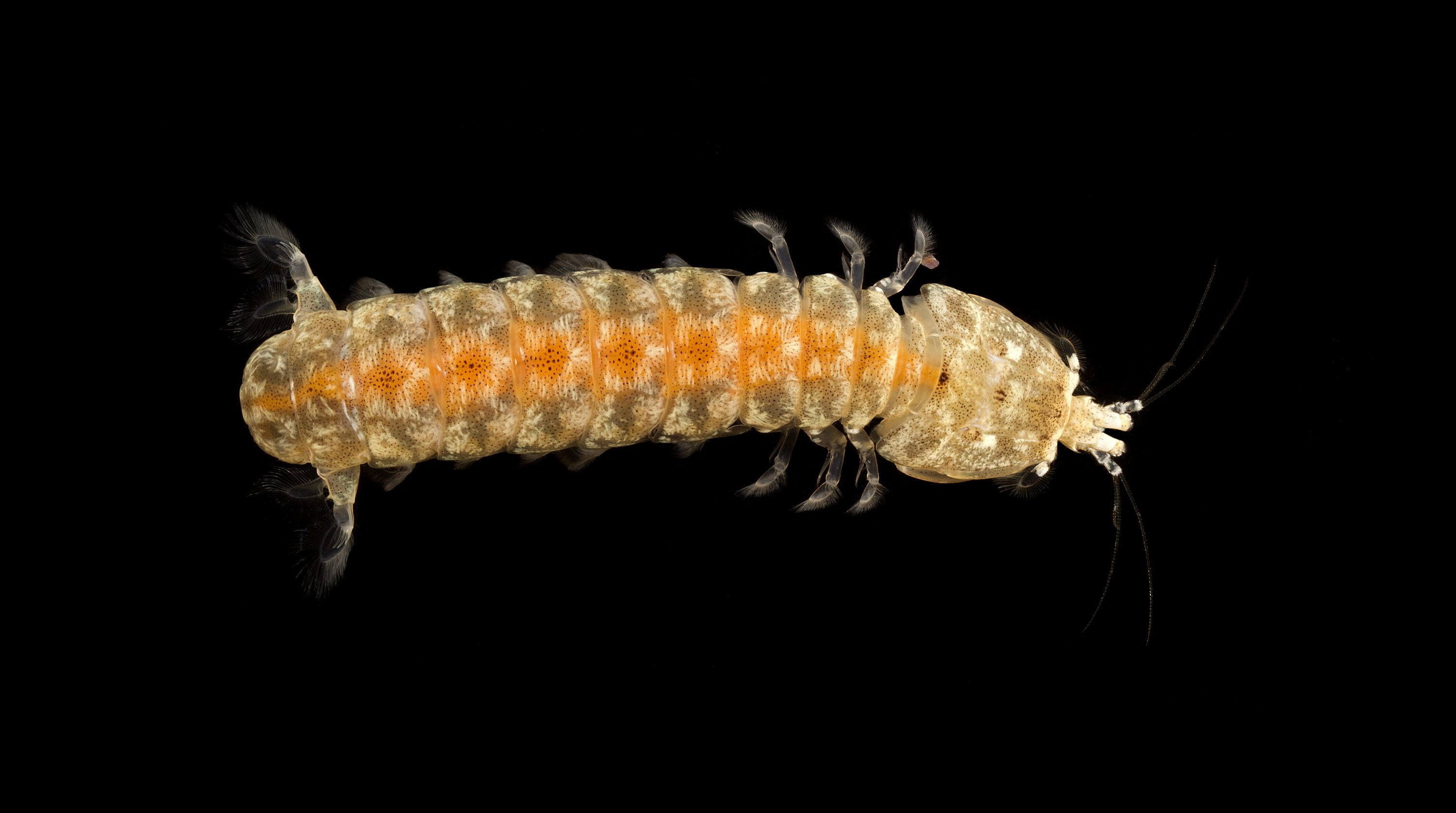
- Hadrosquilla perpasta

Scientific classification
- Kingdom: Animalia
- Phylum: Arthropoda
- Clade: Pancrustacea
- Class: Malacostraca
- Order: Stomatopoda
- Superfamily: Lysiosquilloidea
- Family: Nannosquillidae; Manning, 1980

= Nannosquillidae =

Family of crustaceans

Nannosquillidae is a family of stomatopods, comprising the following genera:

- Acanthosquilla Manning, 1963
- Alachosquilla Schotte & Manning, 1993
- Austrosquilla Manning, 1966
- Bigelowina Schotte & Manning, 1993
- Coronis Desmarest, 1823
- Hadrosquilla Manning, 1966
- Keppelius Manning, 1978
- Madeirasquilla Ďuriš, 2018
- Mexisquilla Manning & Camp, 1981
- Nannosquilla Manning, 1963
- Nannosquilloides Manning, 1977
- Platysquilla Manning, 1967
- Platysquilloides Manning & Camp, 1981
- Pullosquilla Manning, 1978
- Victoriasquilla Ahyong, 2009
