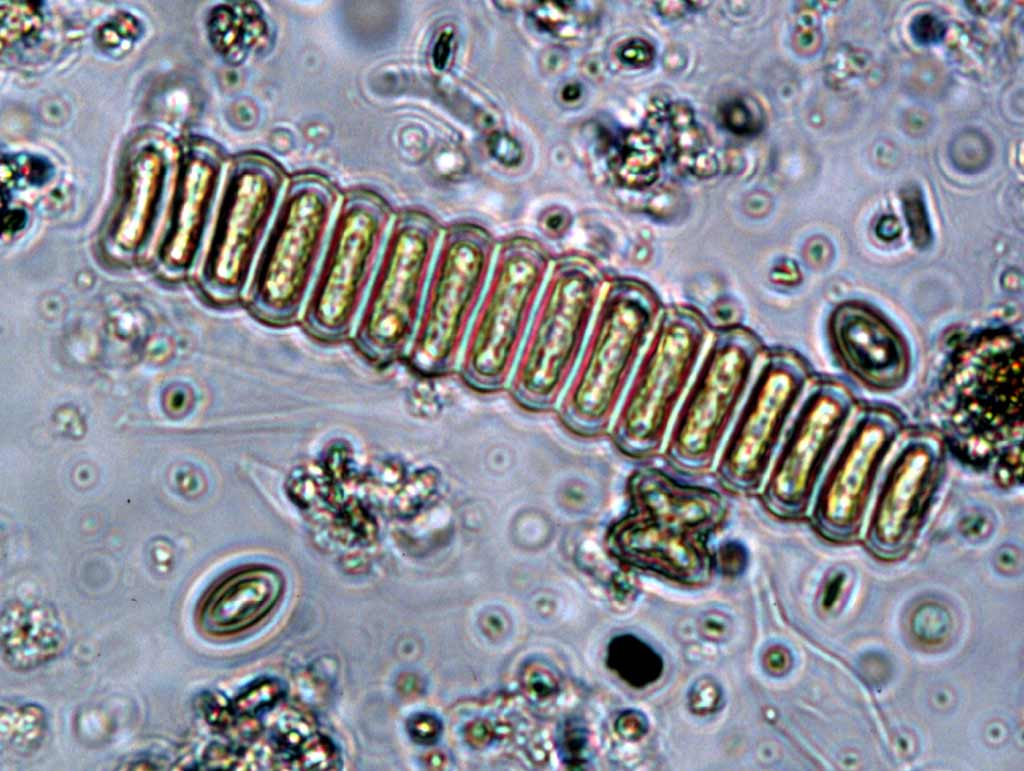
- Scenedesmus bijugus

Scientific classification
- Domain: Eukaryota
- Clade: Archaeplastida
- Clade: Viridiplantae
- Division: Chlorophyta
- Class: Chlorophyceae
- Order: Sphaeropleales
- Family: Scenedesmaceae
- Genus: Scenedesmus; Meyen, 1829

Type species
- Scenedesmus obtusus Meyen, 1829

Species
- Scenedesmus dimorphus; Scenedesmus acuminatus; 72 others (see text)

= Scenedesmus =

Genus of green algae

Scenedesmus is a genus of green algae, in the class Chlorophyceae. They are colonial and non-motile. They are one of the most common components of phytoplankton in freshwater habitats worldwide.

== Taxonomy ==
The starting point of knowledge about Scenedesmus and related algae is in 1820, when Pierre Jean François Turpin observed these algae under a microscope. He classified them under the diatom genus Achnanthes; later authors moved them to different groups, until it was finally classified as a green alga. The name comes from the Greek roots σκηνή (skene), meaning "tent" or "awning", and δεσμός (desmos), meaning "bond".

As of 2015, 74 species of Scenedesmus were accepted taxonomically. Several other subgenera have been identified, but vary according to the source. Hegewald denotes Acutodesmus, Desmodesmus, and Scenedesmus as the three major categories. Acutodesmus is characterized as having acute cell poles, while Desmodesmus and Scenedesmus have obtuse/truncated cell poles (differentiated by the presence or absence of spines). Fossil records date Scenedesmus from 70 to 100 million years ago, with Desmodesmus suspected to be the youngest of these three groups.

== Basic biology ==
Scenedesmus is one of the most common freshwater algae genera; however, the extremely diverse morphologies found within species make identification difficult. While most species are found across the world, certain species exist only in local populations such as S. intermedius and S. serratus which are found in New Zealand.

=== Coenobia and cell growth ===
Scenedesmus can exist as unicells; they are also frequently found in coenobia of four or eight cells inside a parental mother wall. Various coenobial architectures have been described, including linear, costulatoid, irregular, alternating, or dactylococcoid patterns (Figure 1). The formation of coenobia is dependent on a number of factors. A higher proportion of unicellular organisms was found at high light intensities and high temperatures, suggesting that at higher growth rates the organisms prefer to be non-colonized. Successful growth and division for algae relies on a balance between maintaining buoyancy in the euphotic zone (containing ideal light and nutritional conditions) and avoidance of grazing predators. Larger colonies have a smaller surface-to-volume ratio, which limits nutrient uptake and light harvesting, and the large mass promotes sinking. However, in the presence of grazers, such as Daphnia, that threaten to consume unicellular algae, the larger colonies provide significant security. This threat can be so significant that the cells will coalesce into these eight-cell colonies even in severely limiting growth conditions in order to reduce grazing vulnerability or while in nutrient-deplete conditions.

=== Defense mechanisms ===
The cells have other mechanisms of self-defense in addition to colonizing. Scenedesmus can be divided into two subgenera, the non-spiny Scenedesmus and the spiny Desmodesmus. Although spineless, the Scenedesmus subgenera cells have thick cells walls and mucilage, which may make them digestion-resistant. Some chemical compounds in Scenedesmus could even be toxic to certain organisms upon consumption. Bristles of up to 100 μm may form a net in both spiny and non-spiny varieties to discourage predation even further. Cells defensively form these bristles when kairomones are detected, an infochemical released by Daphnia that Scenedesmus has evolved to recognize as a warning signal.

=== Reproduction and colony formation ===
During replication, the mother cell enlarges and becomes multinucleate after multiple divisions. The cytoplasm then is cleaved into uninucleate daughter cells, usually developing as non-motile autospores. These daughter cells typically link up with other daughter cells to form a colony within the parental cell wall to be later released. The cells progress through a typical mitotic cycle similar to other members of Chlorophyceae, with the cytoplasm of the daughter cells becoming very dense. Eventually the mother cell wall breaks and releases the spores which adopt a normal cellular appearance. The cells at either end of the coenobium are different in morphology from those in the center. How the cells adhere to one another during development is still unclear, but it is known that a trilaminar sheath (TLS), composed of algaenan, is one of the first exterior structures to form, developing in patches before growing to connect into one continuous layer. The ornamented layer is the last component to develop.

== Cell ornamentation and outer layers ==
The exterior ornamentation is highly variable within the genus Scenedesmus. Staehelin et al. characterized two species in detail: S. pannonicus and S. longus. S. pannonicus assembles a tight-fitting "warty" layer compared to the loose "reticulate" layer found on S. longus. A shared feature between the two is a TLS found at the junction between neighboring cells that helps cement them together. An additional pectic layer observed on S. pannonicus forms a thick mesh of thin filaments originating from the warty layer. Another feature of the outer coenobial surface of S. pannonicus is a combination of individual spikes (seemingly connected to the warts) and small spikelets that fuse to form combs that zigzag along the cell. An overview of these structures can be seen in Figure 2. The last major category of ornamentation is rosettes that are common to many Scenedesmus species. Rosettes are ring-shaped structures enclosing small mounds on the cell surface and are usually sitting upon a thicker layer of cell wall than the surrounding areas. No potential function for these structures has been suggested. While S. longus was not observed with the comb-like structures of S. pannonicus, it did have two variations of spikelets forming between the TLS and reticulate layer to keep the two apart.

== Mitochondrial DNA ==
Scenedesmus obliquus is notable for the non-standard coding of its mitochondrial DNA which may represent an intermediate form in the evolution of green algal mitochondrial DNA. This code is represented by NCBI translation table 22, Scenedesmus obliquus mitochondrial code.

== Biofuel production ==
Although Scenedesmus is capable of producing many kinds of biofuels such as biohydrogen, biodiesel, bioethanol and drop-in fuels, most extensive research has been done on the use of Scenedesmus for biodiesel production. Like all algae systems, the implementation of integrated biofuel production of Scenedesmus from the laboratory findings has challenges in large-scale production. Major challenges include nutrient supply and recycling, gas transfer and exchange, PAR (Photosynthetically Active Radiation) delivery, cultural integrity, environmental control, land and water availability, harvesting, and genetic and metabolic engineering

=== Biohydrogen (H_{2}) production ===
In 1942, Gaffron and Rubin may be credited with conducting an experiment that sparked H_{2} production research in green algae using Scenedesmus obliquus. Algae produce H_{2} gas under anaerobic conditions by providing hydrogenases with hydrogen ions derived from splitting of water molecules via photosynthesis. However, enzyme activity is transient due to inhibition from O_{2} production via photosynthesis, a problem that continues to plague H_{2} production. S. obliquus is traditionally known to utilize a nickel-iron hydrogenase, but usage of other iron hydrogenases in H_{2} production is also reported. Hydrogenase enzyme activity in Scenedesmus species is reported to be lower than that of Chlamydomonas reinhardtii. H_{2} production independent of Photosystem II in Scenedesmus has also been performed using redox equivalents of fermentative metabolism under dark anaerobic incubation. Research findings suggest that a sulfur-deprived environment triggers an imbalance in the photosynthesis and respiration relationship, resulting in net consumption of O_{2}, causing anaerobiosis, and switching to hydrogen production. Ultrasonication pretreatment has been effective in increasing fermentative bioenergy production from Scenedesmus oliquus YSW15. Biohydrogen production research using Scenedesmus is actively spurred by its applications to wastewater treatment. (See subsequent section on waste management by Scenedesmus).

=== Biodiesel production ===
Scenedesmus is known to have high biomass productivity among green algae, and has been actively researched for its use for biodiesel production. Its heterotrophic production of biomass and lipid in optimized conditions is reported to have higher efficiency than its autotrophic production. Optimization of biomass productivity as well as lipid content through varying concentration of supplemental nutrients has been done in numerous studies; currently, Scenedesmus lipid yield after optimization has reached ~60% dry cell weight, lower than some other algae. However, Scenedesmus is more efficient at capturing CO_{2} than other algae. Like many algae species, Scenedesmus required nitrate-deficient condition to profoundly increase its lipid yield. A significant improvement (up to six-fold) of feedstock yields was achieved by adding varying concentrations of ethanol under a 12-hour photoperiod and in the dark. Under salinity stress via two-stage cultivation, Scenedesmus sp. BHU1 enhances both biomass productivity and lipid content. The most significant improvement in lipid production was obtained when stationary phase cultures were transferred to media deficient in nitrate for 7 days and phosphate for 3 days, respectively. Extraction of oils with methanol or ethanol from the Scenedesmus remains a challenge and its lower lipid content adds to the cost of production. In a recent study, Scenedesmus abundans was isolated from Dal Lake, Kashmir and proved to be a suitable raw material for biodiesel production. The alga increased significantly in biomass and lipid content with the nitrogen concentration of 0.32 g/L of nitrogen. A two-step transesterification was found to be best suited for transesterification, while Folch extraction was best for lipid extraction.

=== Bioethanol ===
Scenedesmus, and other microalgae such as Chlorella, Dunaliella, Chlamydomonas, and Spirulina, contain large amounts of carbohydrate (>50% of the dry weight), which make them attractive candidates for bioethanol production. In one study, Scenedesmus was used to yield high biomass productivity; its carbohydrate-rich biomass was then hydrolyzed with 2% sulfuric acid and underwent an SHF (Separate Hydrolysis and Fermentation) process to produce 8.55 g L^{−1} of ethanol and a maximum yield of 0.213 g ethanol / g biomass within 4 hours of ethanol fermentation.

=== Drop-in fuels ===
Isoprenoids are considered important metabolites that can be utilized as drop-in fuels, often as alkane chains. Scenedesmus conducts a pyruvate/glyeraldehyde 3-phosphate non-mevalonate pathway to synthesize isoprenoids. However, isoprenoid yields were too low (1.5~15 mg per 10 liter of Scenedesmus culture when cells reached 0.5-0.6 g L^{−1}) to be considered viable for future drop-in fuel production.

== Wastewater management ==
Scendesmus species are often able to grow in wastewater or other side streams and are thus regularly cultivated in such streams. In a study comparing the efficiency of ammonia and phosphorus removal from an agroindustrial wastewater by Chlorella vulgaris and Scenedesmus dimorphus, Scenedesmus exhibited better efficiency of removing ammonia in cylindrical bioreactor while both algae removed phosphorus from the wastewater to the same extent. Algal Turf Scrubber (ATS) is one of many technologies that utilize algae for treating variety of wastes and industrially polluted waters. An algal turf scrubber in Florida, for example, removed phosphorus at a cost of $24 per kilogram, compared to $77 for engineered wetland processes. While removing metallic wastes as well as organic substrates, growing Scenedesmus biomass could be utilized for producing cattle feeds, organic fertilizers, paper, construction paper, and biodiesel.

== Gallery ==
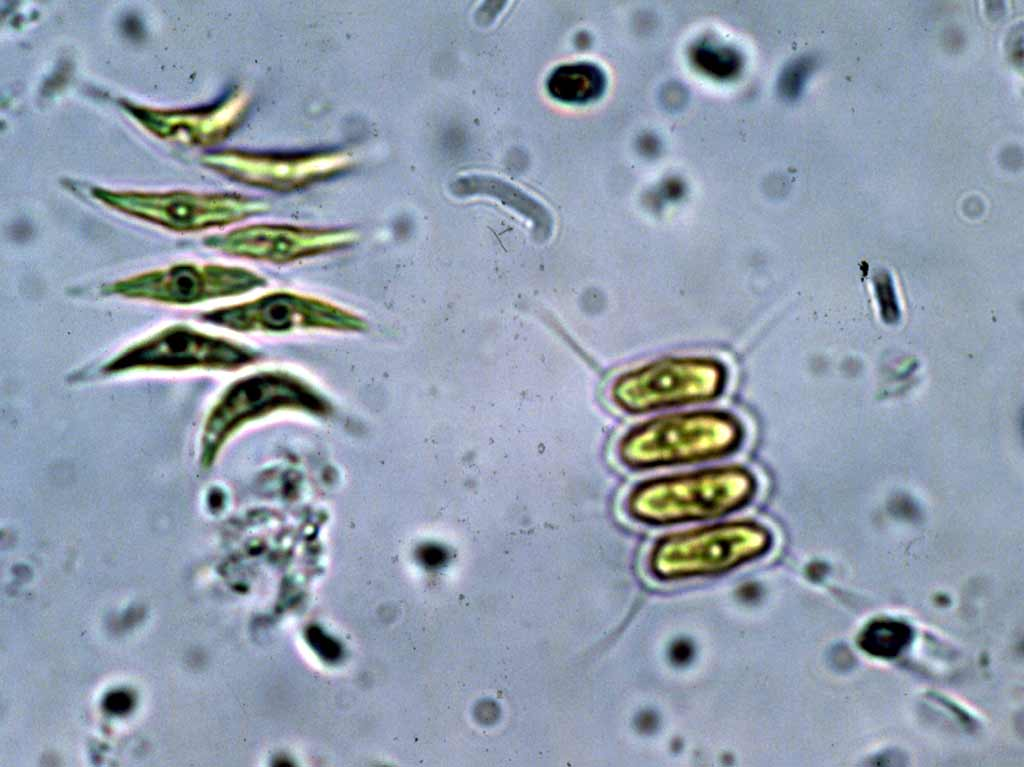
Scenedesmus quadricauda

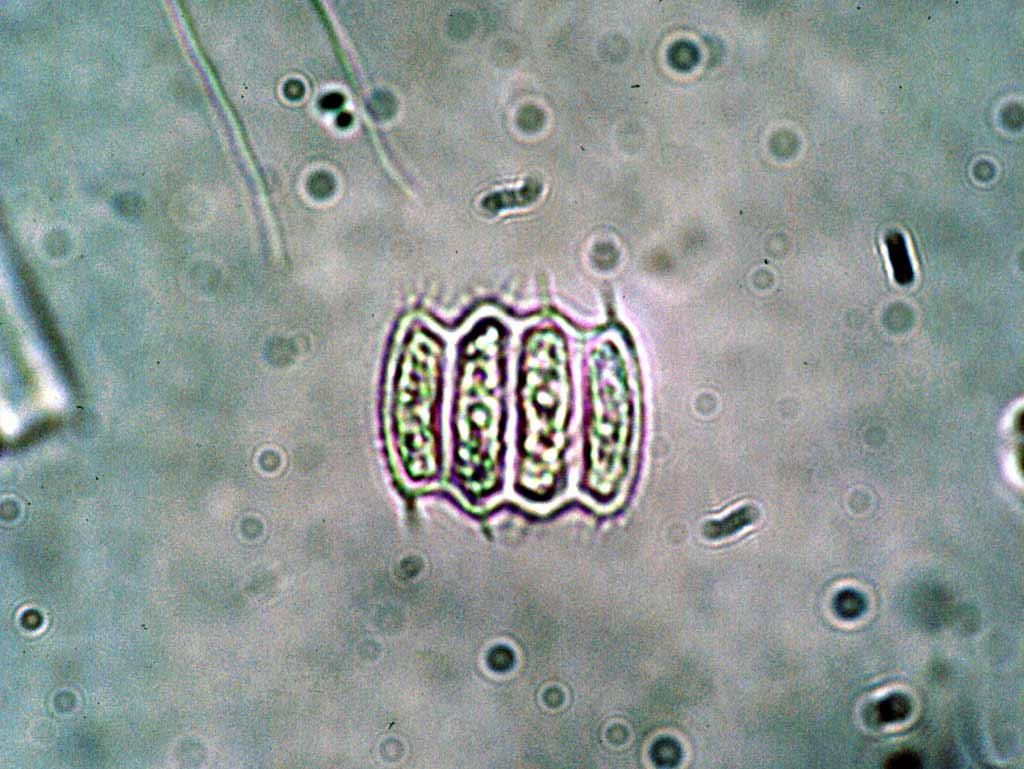
Scenedesmus brasiliensis

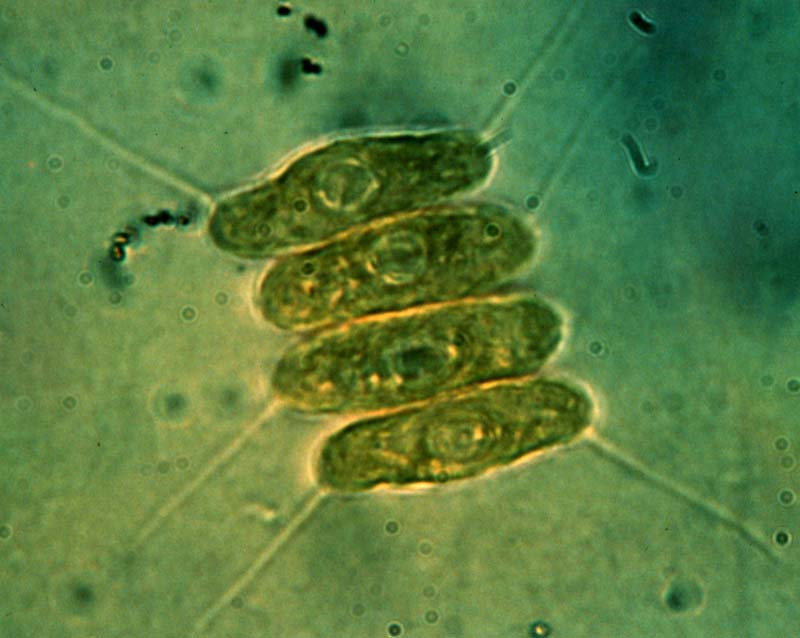

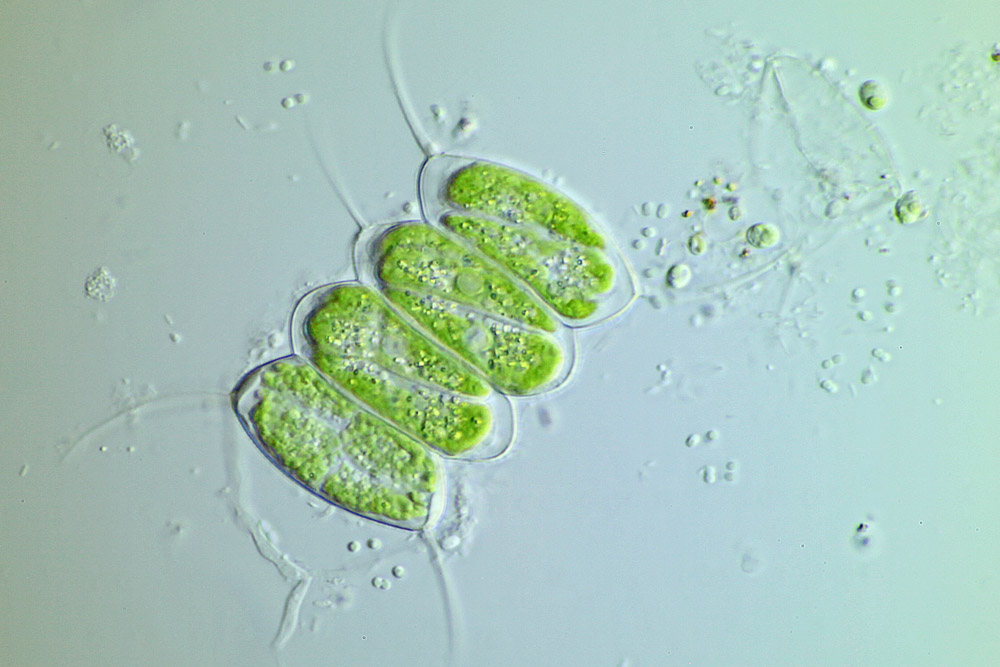

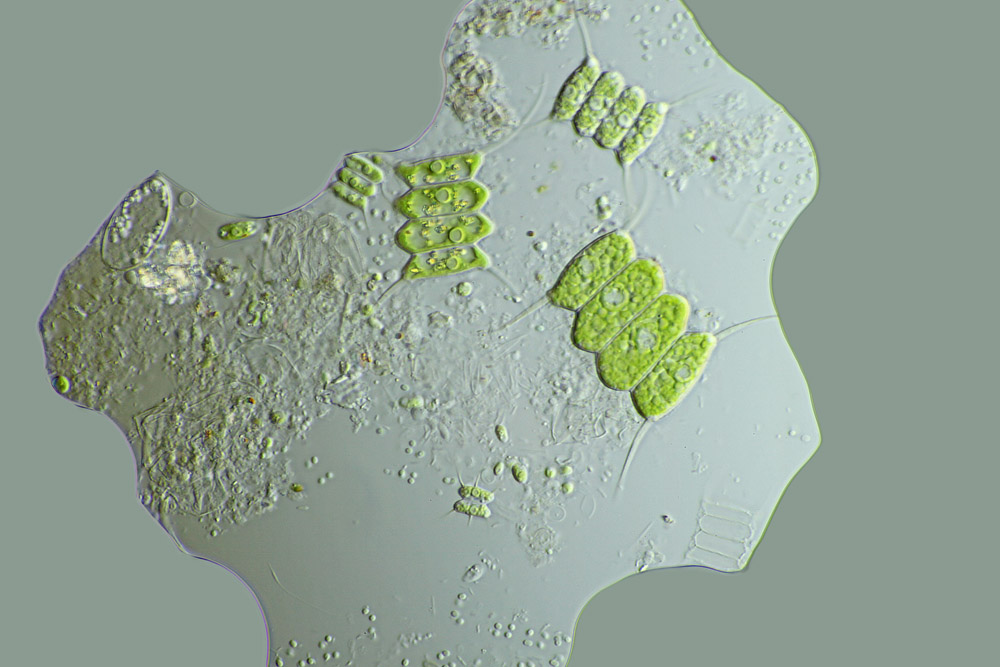

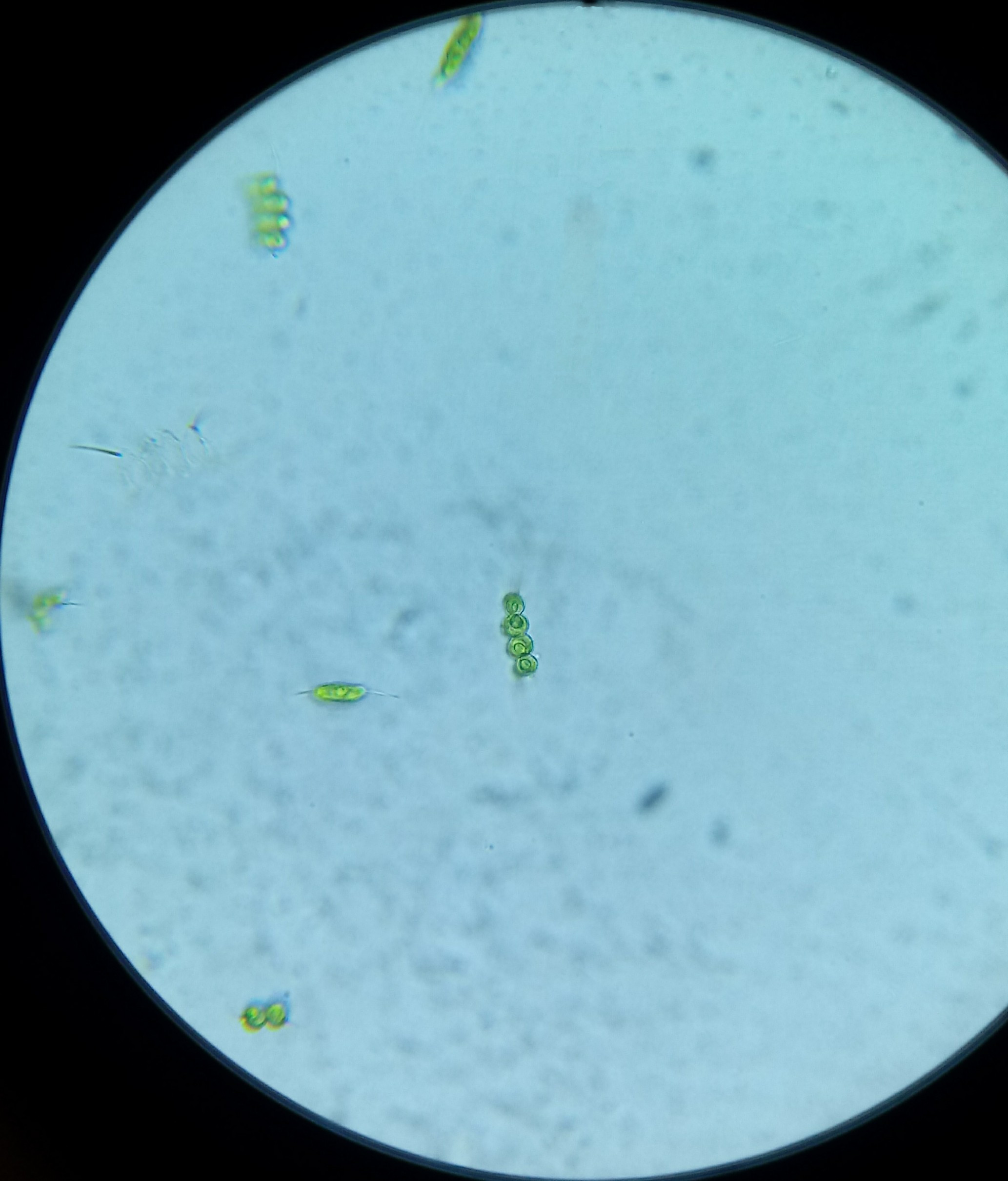
