= Coenobium =

Coenobium or coenobia may refer to:

- Cenobitic monasticism (cenobium, cenobite), a monastic community in a tradition stressing communal life, as opposite to eremitism
- Coenobium (morphology), a colony of cells, notably in algae
- Coenobia (moth)
