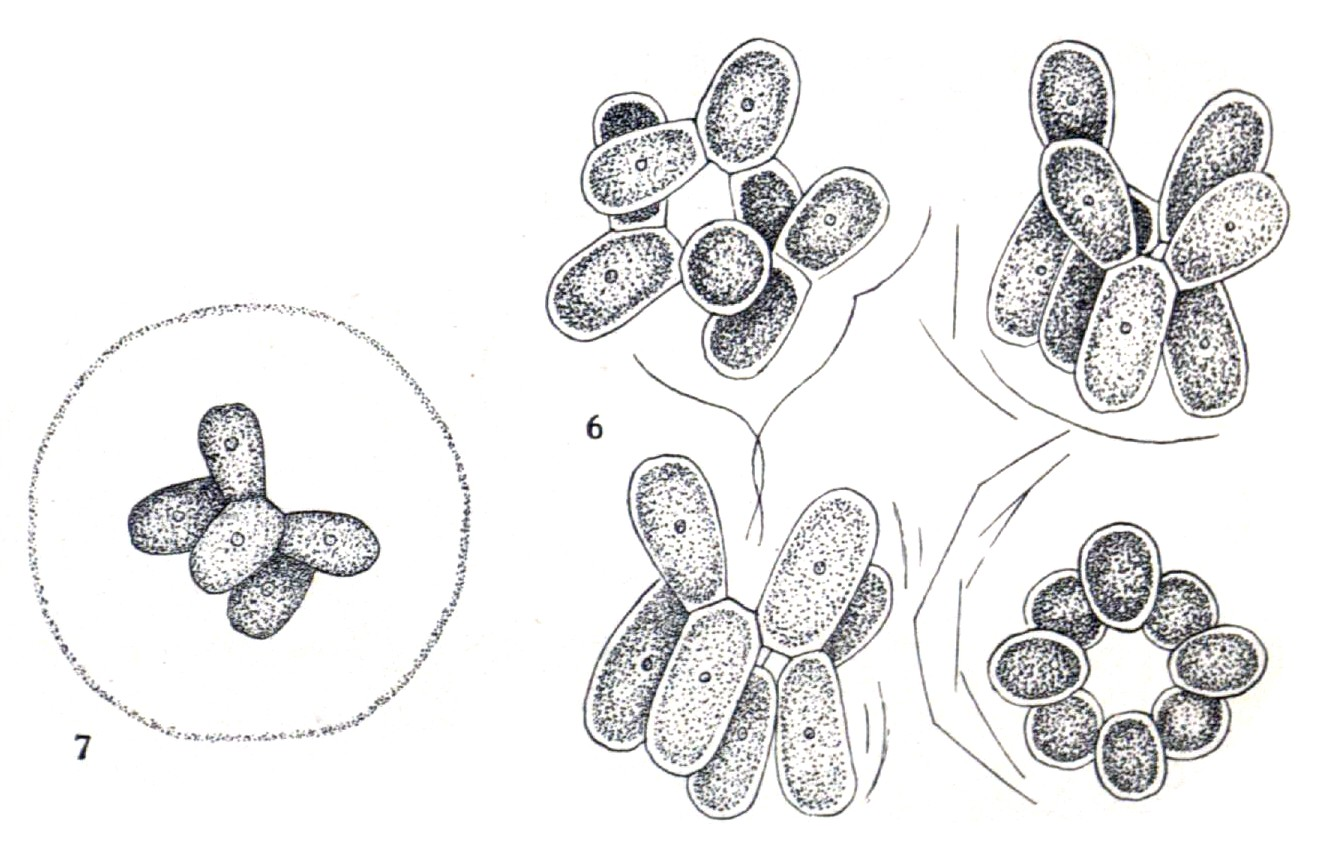
- Schroederiella africana

Scientific classification
- Kingdom: Plantae
- Division: Chlorophyta
- Class: Chlorophyceae
- Order: Sphaeropleales
- Family: Scenedesmaceae
- Genus: Schroederiella; Wołoszyńska

Type species
- Schroederiella africana Wołoszyńska

Species
- Schroederiella africana; Schroederiella papillata

= Schroederiella =

Genus of algae

Schroederiella is a genus of green algae in the family Scenedesmaceae.

The genus was circumscribed by Jadwiga Wołoszyńska in Hedwigia vol.55 on pages 198, 210, 223 in 1914.

The genus name of Schroederiella is in honour of Ludwig Julius Bruno Schröder (1867–1928), who was a German teacher, botanist (Algology and Bryology), also Hydrobiologist and Zoologist. He worked as a deputy head teacher in Breslau.

== Description ==
Schroederiella consists of colonies (called coenobia) of eight (sometimes four) cells. The cells are arranged alternately in a ring shape, and are attached to each other near their poles. Cells are ellipsoid or elongately ellipsoid, 7 to 18 μm long and 5 to 9 μm wide, and are uninucleate with one chloroplast and pyrenoid.

Schroederiella reproduces asexually via the formation of autospores. Four or eight autospores are organized into the shape of a coenobium; they are released from a tear the mother cell wall.

== Species ==
As accepted by WoRMS;

- Schroederiella papillata Korshikov, 1953
- Schroederiella africana Wołoszyńska, 1914
