= Gilbertsmithia =

Scientific classification
- Clade: Viridiplantae
- Division: Chlorophyta
- Class: Chlorophyceae
- Order: Sphaeropleales
- Family: Scenedesmaceae
- Genus: Gilbertsmithia; M.O.P.Iyengar, 1975
- Species: G. grandis

Binomial name
- Gilbertsmithia grandis M.O.P.Iyengar, 1975

Genus of algae

Gilbertsmithia is a genus of green algae in the family Scenedesmaceae, containing the single species Gilbertsmithia grandis. It was named after the American botanist Gilbert Morgan Smith. This remarkable alga has only been recorded once from a muddy rainwater pool in Madras (now Chennai), India.

Gilbertsmithia grandis consists of flattened colonies of cells, termed coenobia. Colonies contain rings of four or eight cells in a ring, akin to beads on a rosary. Cells are uninucleate (with one nucleus) and contain one cup-shaped chloroplast, each with a single pyrenoid in the thicker part of the chloroplast. Colonies are surrounded by a thin layer of mucilage.

Gilbertsmithia grandis reproduces asexually by the formation of autospores. Each cell divides into four or eight protoplasts, and a released via a slit in the mother cell wall. The mother cell wall is retained and becomes angular, and remain attached to each other; therefore, multiple rings may be present on a single colony. Sexual reproduction is not known to occur in this genus.
