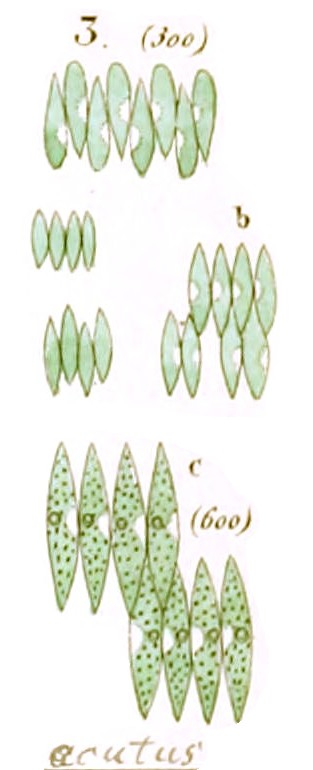
- Tetradesmus obliquus (as Scenedesmus acutus), drawn by Carl Nägeli in 1849)

Scientific classification
- Domain: Eukaryota
- Supergroup: Archaeplastida
- Clade: Viridiplantae
- Division: Chlorophyta
- Class: Chlorophyceae
- Order: Sphaeropleales
- Family: Scenedesmaceae
- Genus: Tetradesmus
- Species: T. obliquus

Binomial name
- Tetradesmus obliquus (Turpin) M.J.Wynne, 2016

Synonyms
- Scenedesmus obliquus (Turpin) Kützing; Acutodesmus obliquus (Turpin) Hegewald & Hanagata

= Tetradesmus obliquus =

Species of green algae

Tetradesmus obliquus is a green algae species of the family Scenedesmaceae. It is commonly known by its synonym, Scenedesmus obliquus. It is a common species found in a variety of freshwater habitats.

Tetradesmus obliquus forms colonies of two or four (occasionally eight) cells in a single row; in culture, solitary cells are often present. Cells are spindle-shaped, (4–)6–15(–25) μm long and 2.2–9.6(–11) μm wide; cells taper to acute apices and are sometimes slightly asymmetrical. Cells contain a single chloroplast filling the cell, with a pyrenoid present in the center.

This chlorophyte species is notable for the genetic coding of its mitochondria which translate TCA as a stop codon and TAG as leucine. This code is represented by NCBI translation table 22, Scenedesmus obliquus mitochondrial code.

There is increasing interest in T. obliquus for uses in biotechnology, such as biofuel production, aquaculture, and wastewater treatment. Both growth and photosynthesis of T. obliquus are affected by the presence of nano-sized microplastics, such as nano-polystyrene (nano-PS).

== See also ==
- List of genetic codes
