= S. terrestris =

S. terrestris may refer to:

- Scotiellopsis terrestris, an alga species
- Skvortzoviothrix terrestris, an alga species

== See also ==
- Terrestris
