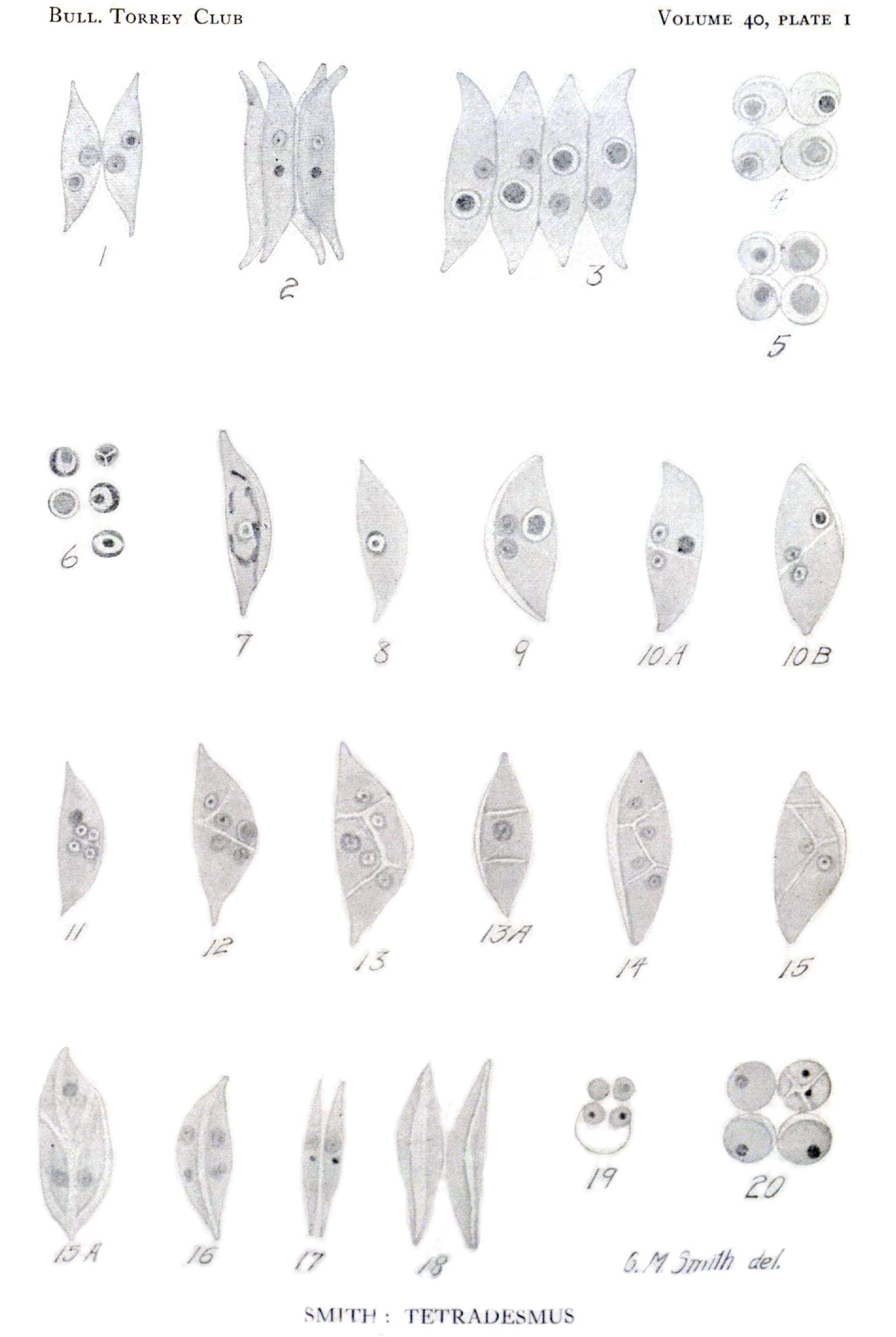
- Tetradesmus wisconsinensis

Scientific classification
- Kingdom: Plantae
- Division: Chlorophyta
- Class: Chlorophyceae
- Order: Sphaeropleales
- Family: Scenedesmaceae
- Genus: Tetradesmus; G.M.Smith

Type species
- Tetradesmus wisconsinensis G.M.Smith

Species
- Tetradesmus dimorphus; Tetradesmus lagerheimii; Tetradesmus wisconsinensis

= Tetradesmus =

Genus of algae

Tetradesmus is a genus of green algae in the family Scenedesmaceae. Species of Tetradesmus are found in a variety of habitats, including fresh water and biological soil crusts in deserts.

== Taxonomy ==
The genus Tetradesmus was described by Gilbert Morgan Smith, containing the single species Tetradesmus wisconsinensis. It was not universally accepted; Robert Hippolyte Chodat synonymized the genus into Scenedesmus, while George Stephen West accepted the genus as separate from Scenedesmus.

In the 2000s, molecular data revealed found that Scenedesmus was polyphyletic. Scenedesmus was subsequently split up into several genera, corresponding to the former subgenera Scenedesmus, Desmodesmus, and Acutodesmus. As Tetradesmus species are phylogenetically closely related to species once placed in Scenedesmus subgenus Acutodesmus, the genus Acutodesmus was raised to genus rank and Tetradesmus was placed as a synonym of Acutodesmus. However, since the name Tetradesmus was published before the genus combination Acutodesmus was made, this meant that the name Tetradesmus had priority Therefore, species in Acutodesmus were renamed to Tetradesmus.
