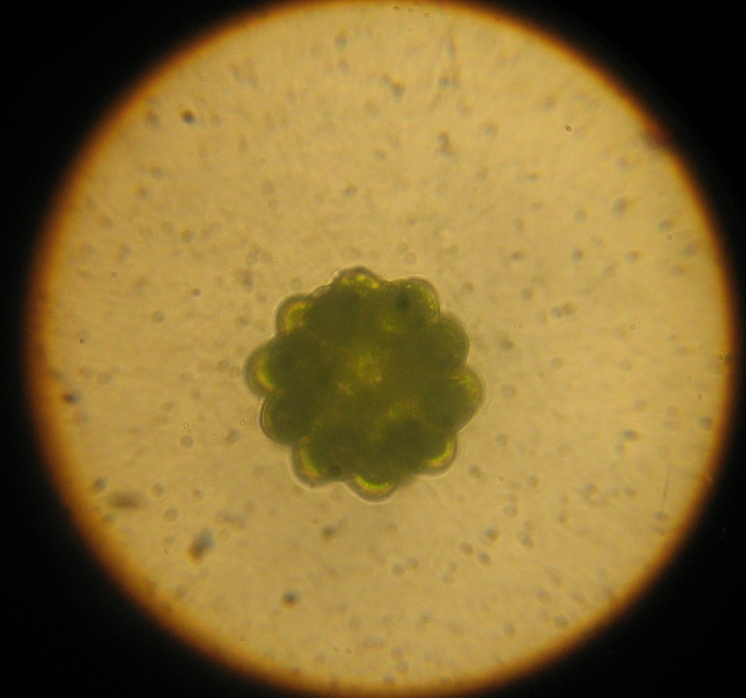
- coenobium of Coelastrum sp.

Scientific classification
- Kingdom: Plantae
- Division: Chlorophyta
- Class: Chlorophyceae
- Order: Sphaeropleales
- Family: Scenedesmaceae
- Genus: Coelastrum; Nägeli, 1849

Type species
- Coelastrum sphaericum Nägeli, 1849

Species
- See text

= Coelastrum =

Genus of algae

Coelastrum is a genus of green algae in the Scenedesmaceae family. It is a common component of the phytoplankton in freshwater habitats such as ponds, lakes, waterfalls, and temporary pools of water, particularly eutrophic ones. The genus has a more or less cosmopolitan distribution, although some species appear to have more restricted geographical distributions. The name comes from the Greek terms koilos, meaning hollow, and astron, meaning star.

== Description ==
Coelastrum consists of round colonies of cells (termed coenobia) of 4, 8, 16, 32, or 64 cells. Cells are spherical to polygonal, and are connected to each other via extensions of their cell walls to form hollow spheres. The cells may have various ornamentation such as protuberans, and have one parietal chloroplast with a single pyrenoid.

Coelastrum reproduces asexually. Prior to reproduction, cell nuclei undergo mitosis, forming multinucleate cells. The cell then undergoes cytokinesis and a new daughter colony is formed within the parental cell.

=== Identification ===
Species of Coelastrum are distinguished from each other by their morphologies—in particular, their cell size and shape, number of cells per coenobia, and the nature of the ornamentation surrounding the cells and connecting the cells to each other. However, a great deal of morphological variability exists, which complicates species delimitation and therefore identification.

A similar genus is Hariotina, also part of the subfamily Coelastroideae. Hariotina can be distinguished by having cells connected by one to three strands at the top (rather than at their base), and by having colonies surrounded by mucilage (while Coelastrum lacks mucilage).

== Taxonomy ==
Coelastrum was once classified as a member of its own family, the Coelastraceae, which has always considered to be similar to the Scenedesmaceae. With molecular phylogenetic analyses, Scenedesmaceae was found to paraphyletic with respect to Coelastraceae and therefore Coelastraceae placed into Scenedesmaceae as its own subfamily, Coelastroideae.

== Uses ==
Species of Coelastrum have been tested for uses in biotechnology, such as lipid or astaxanthin production and wastewater treatment. In paleoecology, they serve as a marker for eutrophication.

== Species list ==
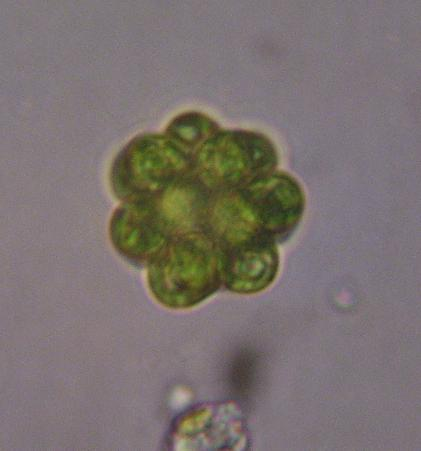
Coenobium of Coelastrum sp.

- Coelastrum astroideum
- Coelastrum cambricum
- Coelastrum chodatii
- Coelastrum crenatum
- Coelastrum giganteum
- Coelastrum indicum
- Coelastrum irregulare
- Coelastrum microporum
- Coelastrum morus
- Coelastrum naegelii
- Coelastrum printzii
- Coelastrum probiscideum
- Coelastrum pseudomicroporum
- Coelastrum pulchellum
- Coelastrum pulchrum
- Coelastrum reticulatum
- Coelastrum schizodermaticum
- Coelastrum sphaericum
- Coelastrum stuhlmanii
- Coelastrum triangulare
- Coelastrum verrucosum
