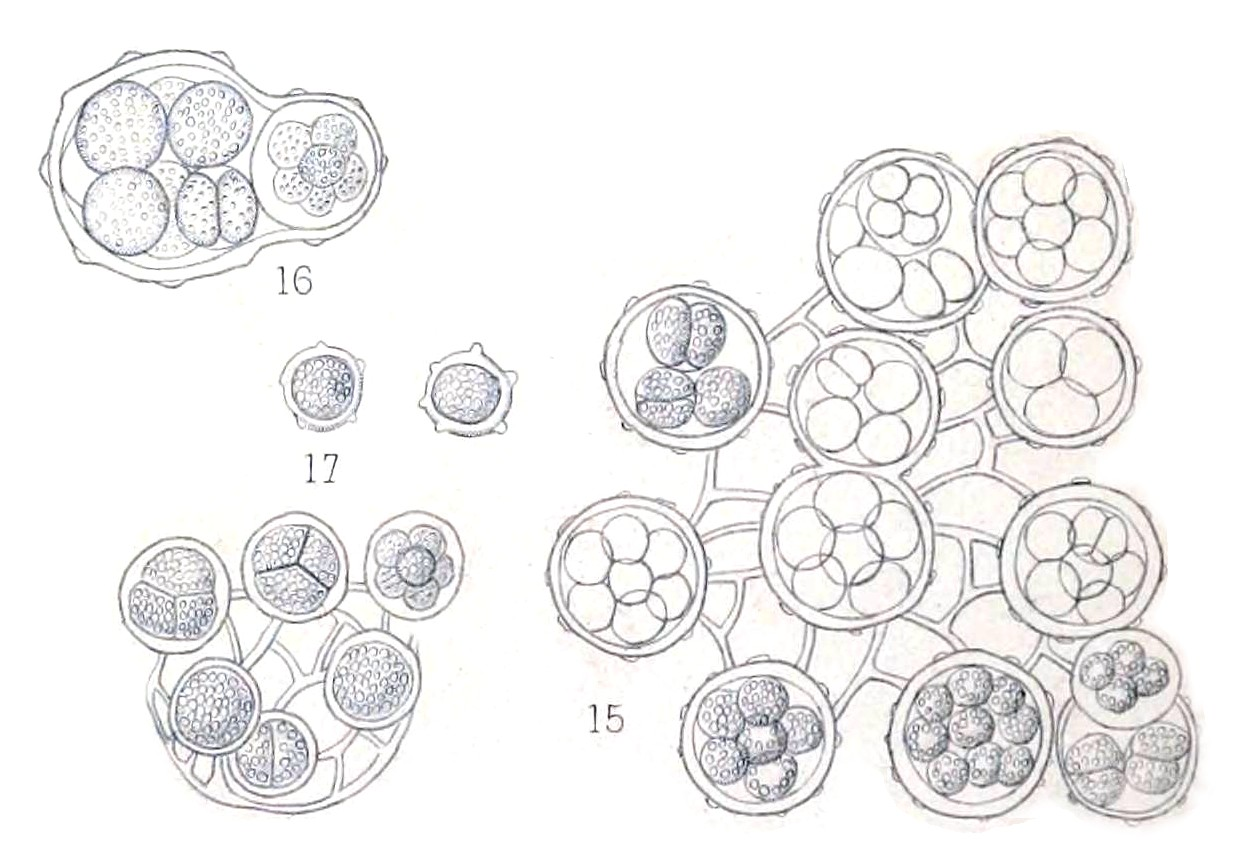
- Hariotina reticulata

Scientific classification
- Kingdom: Plantae
- Division: Chlorophyta
- Class: Chlorophyceae
- Order: Sphaeropleales
- Family: Scenedesmaceae
- Genus: Hariotina; P.-A.Dangeard

Type species
- Hariotina reticulata P.A.Dangeard

Species
- Hariotina compacta; Hariotina guilinensis; Hariotina hainanensis; Hariotina laxa; Hariotina polychorda; Hariotina reticulata

= Hariotina =

Genus of algae

Hariotina is a genus of green algae in the family Scenedesmaceae. They are classified in the subfamily Coelastroideae.

The genus name of Hariotina is in honour of Paul Auguste Joseph Valentin Hariot (1854-1917), who was a French naturalist, botanist (Bryology, and Algology) and apothecary. In 1882, he worked in the Cryptogam department of the National Museum of Natural History, France in Paris.

The genus was circumscribed by Pierre Augustin Dangeard in Botaniste vol.1 on page 162 in 1889.

Species of Hariotina are typically found in stagnant water in tropical or subtropical regions. Some species have also been found in temperate regions and large rivers.

== Description ==
Hariotina consists of free-living colonies (called coenobia) of four, eight, 16, 32, or (rarely) 64 cells organized into a hollow sphere. Cells are roughly spherical and connected to neighboring cells at their apices via elongated stretches of the outer layer of the cell wall, with one to three strands connecting each pair of neighboring cells. Cells contain a single chloroplast, each with one pyrenoid.

Hariotina is morphologically similar to the genus Coelastrum, and species of Hariotina were once considered to be part of Coelastrum. Whereas Coelastrum has cells that are joined to each other at their bases, Hariotina has cells connected to each other at their apices. In addition, colonies of Hariotina have a surrounding layer of mucilage, which is absent in Coelastrum.

== Species ==
As of 2024, six species of Hariotina are known. Molecular phylogenetics suggest the following relationships:

- - Hariotina laxa
  - - Hariotina guilinensis
    - - - Hariotina reticulata
        - Hariotina compacta
      - - Hariotina hainanensis
        - Hariotina polychorda

Species of Hariotina differ subtly from each other in terms of the size and shape of colonies, as well as the intercellular strands that connect cells. However, a combination of molecular markers (18S rDNA, ITS, and tufA) appears to be the most reliable way to identify species.
