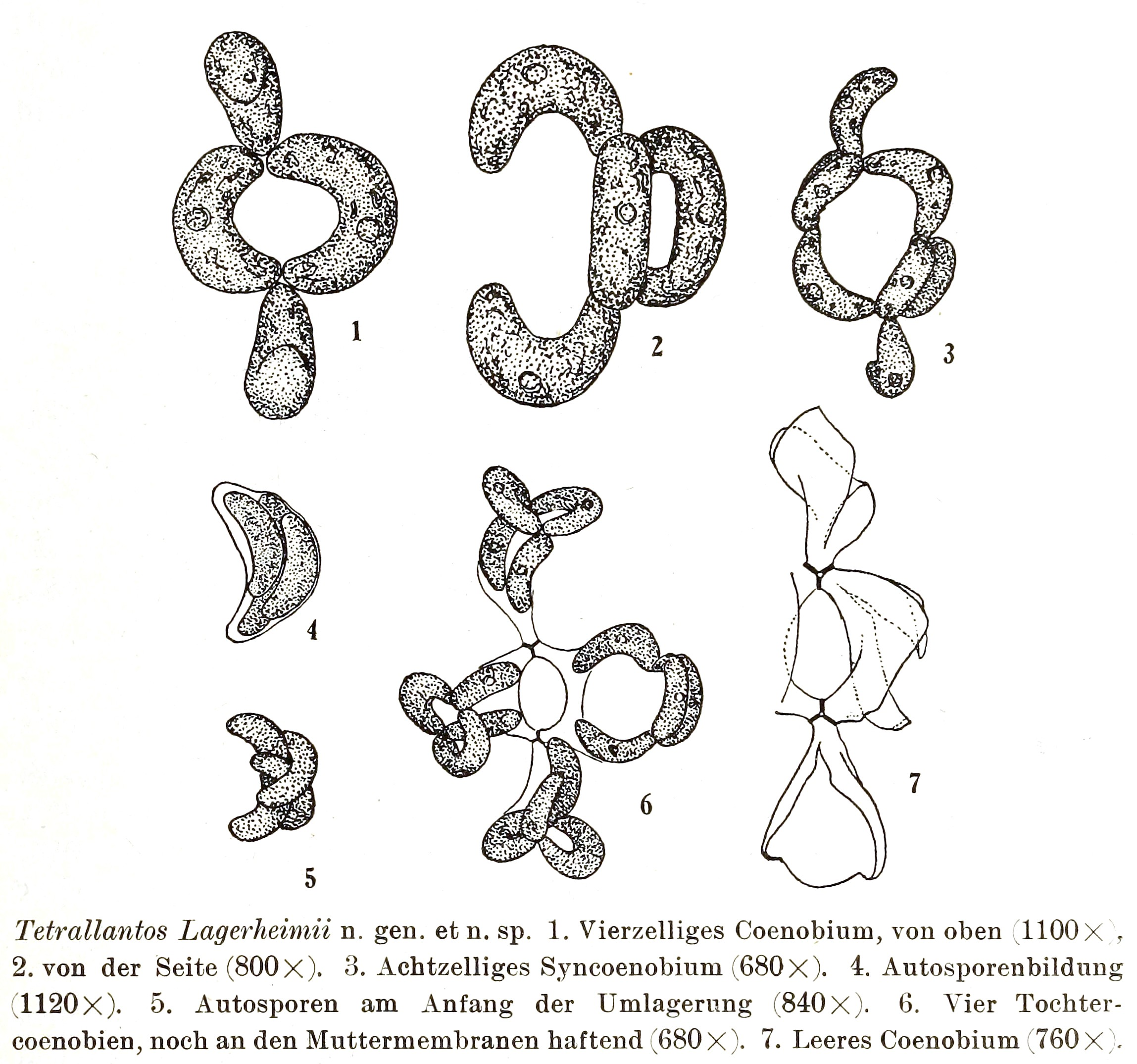
- Tetrallantos lagerheimii

Scientific classification
- Clade: Viridiplantae
- Division: Chlorophyta
- Class: Chlorophyceae
- Order: Sphaeropleales
- Family: Scenedesmaceae
- Genus: Tetrallantos; Teiling, 1916

Type species
- Tetrallantos lagerheimii Teiling, 1916

Species
- Tetrallantos lagerheimii; Tetrallantos novae-geronae

= Tetrallantos =

Genus of algae

Tetrallantos is a genus of green algae in the Scenedesmaceae family. It is a component of the phytoplankton or metaphyton of freshwater habitats such as ponds and lakes It has been found worldwide, but appears to be somewhat rare.

Tetrallantos consists of colonies (called coenobia) of four or eight cells. Each cell is crescent-shaped with rounded ends. In the center of the colony, two cells lie in one plane with their ends touching each other; the other cells are attached to those ends and are curved away in a different plane. Fragments of the parent cell wall persist as faint threads connecting the cells together. Each cell contains a single chloroplast filling the cell with a pyrenoid in its center.

Tetrallantos reproduces asexually by the formation of autospores. In each cell, four (sometimes two or eight) spores are formed per sporangium, and are organized into the shape of coenobia. These are released from the mother cell via a tear in its cell wall, but may sometimes aggregate to the mother cell wall.
