= Stop codon =

Codon that marks the end of a protein-coding sequence

Stop codon (red dot) of the human mitochondrial DNA MT-ATP8 gene, and start codon (blue circle) of the MT-ATP6 gene. For each nucleotide triplet (square brackets), the corresponding amino acid is given (one-letter code), either in the +1 reading frame for MT-ATP8 (in red) or in the +3 frame for MT-ATP6 (in blue). In this genomic region, the two genes overlap.

In molecular biology, a stop codon (or termination codon) is a codon (nucleotide triplet within messenger RNA) that signals the termination of the translation process of the current protein. Most codons in messenger RNA correspond to the addition of an amino acid to a growing polypeptide chain, which may ultimately become a protein; stop codons signal the termination of this process by binding release factors, which cause the ribosomal subunits to disassociate, releasing the amino acid chain.

While start codons need nearby sequences or initiation factors to start translation, a stop codon alone is sufficient to initiate termination.

== Properties ==
=== Standard codons ===
In the standard genetic code, there are three different termination codons:

Codon		Standard code (Translation table 1)	Name
DNA	RNA	Standard code (Translation table 1)	Name
TAG	UAG	STOP = Ter (*)	"amber"
TAA	UAA	STOP = Ter (*)	"ochre"
TGA	UGA	STOP = Ter (*)	"opal" (or "umber")

=== Alternative stop codons ===
There are variations on the standard genetic code, and alternative stop codons have been found in the mitochondrial genomes of vertebrates, Scenedesmus obliquus, and Thraustochytrium.

Table of alternative stop codons and comparison with the standard genetic code
Genetic code	Translation table	Codon		Translation with this code	Standard translation
Genetic code	Translation table	DNA	RNA	Translation with this code	Standard translation
Vertebrate mitochondrial	2	AGA	AGA	STOP = Ter (*)	Arg (R)
Vertebrate mitochondrial	2	AGG	AGG	STOP = Ter (*)	Arg (R)
Scenedesmus obliquus mitochondrial	22	TCA	UCA	STOP = Ter (*)	Ser (S)
Thraustochytrium mitochondrial	23	TTA	UUA	STOP = Ter (*)	Leu (L)

Amino-acid biochemical properties	Nonpolar	Polar	Basic	Acidic	Termination: stop codon

=== Reassigned stop codons ===
The nuclear genetic code is flexible as illustrated by variant genetic codes that reassign standard stop codons to amino acids.

Table of conditional stop codons and comparison with the standard genetic code
Genetic code	Translation table	Codon		Conditional translation			Standard translation
Genetic code	Translation table	DNA	RNA	Conditional translation			Standard translation
Karyorelict nuclear	27	TGA	UGA	Ter (*)	or	Trp (W)	Ter (*)
Condylostoma nuclear	28	TAA	UAA	Ter (*)	or	Gln (Q)	Ter (*)
Condylostoma nuclear	28	TAG	UAG	Ter (*)	or	Gln (Q)	Ter (*)
Condylostoma nuclear	28	TGA	UGA	Ter (*)	or	Trp (W)	Ter (*)
Blastocrithidia nuclear	31	TAA	UAA	Ter (*)	or	Glu (E)	Ter (*)
Blastocrithidia nuclear	31	TAG	UAG	Ter (*)	or	Glu (E)	Ter (*)

=== Translation ===
In 1986, convincing evidence was provided that selenocysteine (Sec) was incorporated co-translationally. Moreover, the codon partially directing its incorporation in the polypeptide chain was identified as UGA also known as the opal termination codon. Different mechanisms for overriding the termination function of this codon have been identified in prokaryotes and in eukaryotes. A particular difference between these kingdoms is that cis elements seem restricted to the neighborhood of the UAG codon in prokaryotes while in eukaryotes this restriction is not present. Instead such locations seem disfavored albeit not prohibited.

In 2003, a landmark paper described the identification of all known selenoproteins in humans: 25 in total. Similar analyses have been run for other organisms.

The UAG codon can translate into pyrrolysine (Pyl) in a similar manner.

=== Genomic distribution ===
Distribution of stop codons within the genome of an organism is non-random and can correlate with GC-content. For example, the E. coli K-12 genome contains 2705 TAA (63%), 1257 TGA (29%), and 326 TAG (8%) stop codons (GC content 50.8%). Also the substrates for the stop codons release factor 1 or release factor 2 are strongly correlated to the abundance of stop codons. Large scale study of bacteria with a broad range of GC-contents shows that while the frequency of occurrence of TAA is negatively correlated to the GC-content and the frequency of occurrence of TGA is positively correlated to the GC-content, the frequency of occurrence of the TAG stop codon, which is often the minimally used stop codon in a genome, is not influenced by the GC-content.

=== Recognition ===
Recognition of stop codons in bacteria have been associated with the so-called 'tripeptide anticodon', a highly conserved amino acid motif in RF1 (PxT) and RF2 (SPF). Even though this is supported by structural studies, it was shown that the tripeptide anticodon hypothesis is an oversimplification.

== Nomenclature ==
Stop codons were historically given many different names, as they each corresponded to a distinct class of mutants that all behaved in a similar manner. These mutants were first isolated within bacteriophages (T4 and lambda), viruses that infect the bacteria Escherichia coli. Mutations in viral genes weakened their infectious ability, sometimes creating viruses that were able to infect and grow within only certain varieties of E. coli.

=== amber mutations (UAG) ===
They were the first set of nonsense mutations to be discovered, isolated by Richard H. Epstein and Charles Steinberg and named after their friend and graduate Caltech student Harris Bernstein, whose last name means "amber" in German (cf. Bernstein).

Viruses with amber mutations are characterized by their ability to infect only certain strains of bacteria, known as amber suppressors. These bacteria carry their own mutation that allows a recovery of function in the mutant viruses. For example, a mutation in the tRNA that recognizes the amber stop codon allows translation to "read through" the codon and produce a full-length protein, thereby recovering the normal form of the protein and "suppressing" the amber mutation. Thus, amber mutants are an entire class of virus mutants that can grow in bacteria that contain amber suppressor mutations. Similar suppressors are known for ochre and opal stop codons as well.

tRNA molecules carrying unnatural aminoacids have been designed to recognize the amber stop codon in bacterial RNA. This technology allows for incorporation of orthogonal aminoacids (such as p-azidophenylalanine) at specific locations of the target protein.

=== ochre mutations (UAA) ===
It was the second stop codon mutation to be discovered. Reminiscent of the usual yellow-orange-brown color associated with amber, this second stop codon was given the name of "ochre", an orange-reddish-brown mineral pigment.

Ochre mutant viruses had a property similar to amber mutants in that they recovered infectious ability within certain suppressor strains of bacteria. The set of ochre suppressors was distinct from amber suppressors, so ochre mutants were inferred to correspond to a different nucleotide triplet. Through a series of mutation experiments comparing these mutants with each other and other known amino acid codons, Sydney Brenner concluded that the amber and ochre mutations corresponded to the nucleotide triplets "UAG" and "UAA".

=== opal or umber mutations (UGA) ===
The third and last stop codon in the standard genetic code was discovered soon after, and corresponds to the nucleotide triplet "UGA".

To continue matching with the theme of colored minerals, the third nonsense codon came to be known as "opal", which is a type of silica showing a variety of colors. Nonsense mutations that created this premature stop codon were later called opal mutations or umber mutations.

== Mutations and disease ==
=== Nonsense ===
Nonsense mutations are changes in DNA sequence that introduce a premature stop codon, causing any resulting protein to be abnormally shortened. This often causes a loss of function in the protein, as critical parts of the amino acid chain are no longer assembled. Because of this terminology, stop codons have also been referred to as nonsense codons.

=== Nonstop ===
A nonstop mutation, also called a stop-loss variant, is a point mutation that occurs within a stop codon. Nonstop mutations cause the continued translation of an mRNA strand into what should be an untranslated region. Most polypeptides resulting from a gene with a nonstop mutation lose their function due to their extreme length and the impact on normal folding. Nonstop mutations differ from nonsense mutations in that they do not create a stop codon but, instead, delete one. Nonstop mutations also differ from missense mutations, which are point mutations where a single nucleotide is changed to cause replacement by a different amino acid. Nonstop mutations have been linked with many inherited diseases including endocrine disorders, eye disease, and neurodevelopmental disorders.

== Hidden stops ==
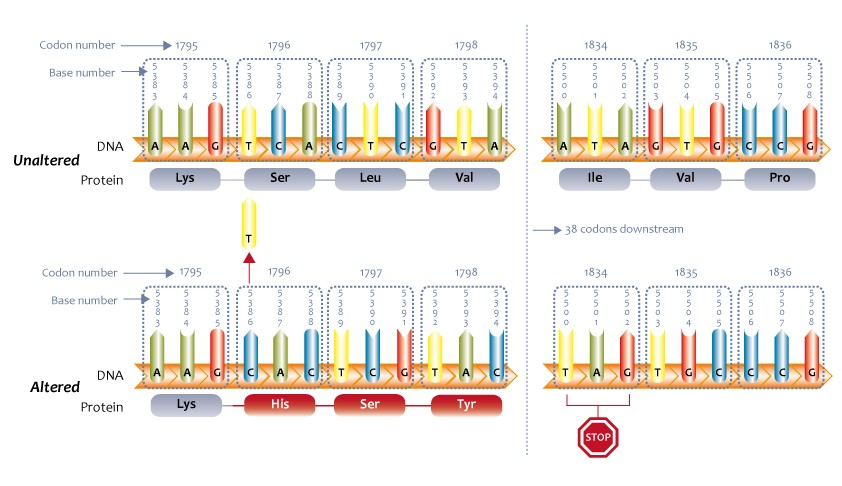
An example of a single base deletion forming a stop codon.

Hidden stops are non-stop codons that would be read as stop codons if they were frameshifted +1 or −1. These prematurely terminate translation if the corresponding frame-shift (such as due to a ribosomal RNA slip) occurs before the hidden stop. It is hypothesised that this decreases resource wastage on nonfunctional proteins and the production of potential cytotoxins. Researchers at Louisiana State University propose the ambush hypothesis, that hidden stops are selected for. Codons that can form hidden stops are used in genomes more frequently compared to synonymous codons that would otherwise code for the same amino acid. Unstable rRNA in an organism correlates with a higher frequency of hidden stops. However, this hypothesis could not be validated with a larger data set.

Stop-codons and hidden stops together are collectively referred as stop-signals. Researchers at University of Memphis found that the ratios of the stop-signals on the three reading frames of a genome (referred to as translation stop-signals ratio or TSSR) of genetically related bacteria, despite their great differences in gene contents, are much alike. This nearly identical genomic-TSSR value of genetically related bacteria may suggest that bacterial genome expansion is limited by their unique stop-signals bias of that bacterial species.

== Translational readthrough ==
Stop codon suppression or translational readthrough occurs when in translation a stop codon is interpreted as a sense codon, that is, when a (standard) amino acid is 'encoded' by the stop codon. Mutated tRNAs can be the cause of readthrough, but also certain nucleotide motifs close to the stop codon. Translational readthrough is very common in viruses and bacteria, and has also been found as a gene regulatory principle in humans, yeasts, bacteria and drosophila. This kind of endogenous translational readthrough constitutes a variation of the genetic code, because a stop codon codes for an amino acid. In the case of human malate dehydrogenase, the stop codon is read through with a frequency of about 4%. The amino acid inserted at the stop codon depends on the identity of the stop codon itself: Gln, Tyr, and Lys have been found for the UAA and UAG codons, while Cys, Trp, and Arg for the UGA codon have been identified by mass spectrometry. Extent of readthrough in mammals have widely variable extents, and can broadly diversify the proteome and affect cancer progression.

== Use as a watermark ==
In 2010, when Craig Venter unveiled the first fully functioning, reproducing cell controlled by synthetic DNA he described how his team used frequent stop codons to create watermarks in RNA and DNA to help confirm the results were indeed synthetic (and not contaminated or otherwise), using it to encode authors' names and website addresses.

== See also ==
- Genetic code
- Start codon
- Terminator (genetics)
- Null-terminated string
