= Neodesmus =

Scientific classification
- Kingdom: Plantae
- Division: Chlorophyta
- Class: Chlorophyceae
- Order: Sphaeropleales
- Family: Scenedesmaceae
- Genus: Neodesmus; Hindák

Type species
- Neodesmus danubialis Hindák

Species
- Neodesmus danubialis; Neodesmus pupukensis

Genus of algae

Neodesmus is a genus of green algae in the family Scenedesmaceae.

Neodesmus consists of colonies of two cells, termed coenobia (plural of coenobium); these coenobia may be further arranged in a structured called a syncoenobium surrounded by a mucilage envelope. The cells are fusiform to cylindrical, 5 to 9 μm long and arranged obliquely next to each other. Syncoenobia may be up to 65 μm long. Each cell is uninucleate (i.e. with one nucleus) and contains one parietal chloroplast, each with a pyrenoid.

Neodesmus reproduces asexually by forming autospores; two spores are produced per cell. Sexual reproduction or flagellated life stages have not been observed in Neodesmus.
