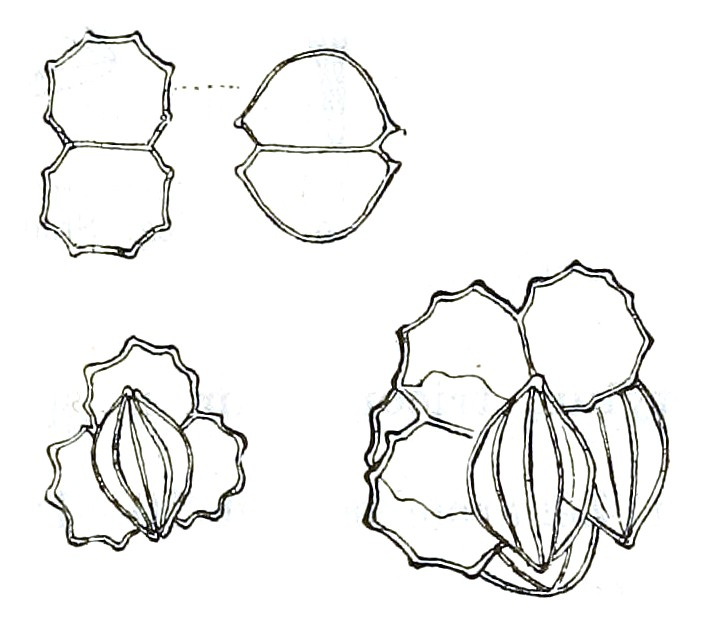
- Enallax coelastroides

Scientific classification
- Kingdom: Plantae
- Division: Chlorophyta
- Class: Chlorophyceae
- Order: Sphaeropleales
- Family: Scenedesmaceae
- Genus: Enallax; Pascher

Type species
- Enallax coelastroides (Bohlin) Skuja

Species
- Enallax coelastroides; Enallax costatus

= Enallax =

Genus of algae

Enallax is a genus of green algae in the family Scenedesmaceae. It is found in freshwater habitats, such as peat bogs or wet rocks.

Enallax consists of colonies, termed coenobia. Each colony comprises two, four, or eight cells arranged in a row or two alternating rows. Cells are ellipsoidal, cylindrical or fusiform, with their longest axes aligned more or less parallel to each other. The cell walls have three to six longitudinal ribs running from pole to pole. Each cell has one parietal chloroplast with a single pyrenoid. Cells are uninucleate. Cells may accumulate droplets of oil giving them a reddish color. Enallax reproduces asexually via the formation of autospores. The autospores form into the shape of a colony while in the mother cell, and are released by a tear in the mother cell wall.

The genus has existed since at least the Cretaceous period, as evidenced by amber deposits from France containing the fossil species Enallax napoleonis.
