= Coelastropsis =

Scientific classification
- Kingdom: Plantae
- Division: Chlorophyta
- Class: Chlorophyceae
- Order: Sphaeropleales
- Family: Scenedesmaceae
- Genus: Coelastropsis; B.Fott & T.Kalina
- Species: C. costata

Binomial name
- Coelastropsis costata B.Fott & T.Kalina 1979

Genus of algae

Coelastropsis is a genus of green algae in the family Scenedesmaceae, containing the single species Coelastropsis costata. It is found in freshwater lakes and bogs, usually associated with mosses and filamentous algae. It has been recorded in Europe, Cuba and possibly New Zealand.

Coelastropsis consists of coenobia of cells. Cells are borne in irregular spheroidal clusters of 2, 4, 8, or 16, not surrounded by a layer of mucilage. Cells are surrounded by a thick cell wall which are covered in longitudinal ribs. The cell contains a single parietal chloroplast, with one pyrenoids.

Coelastropsis reproduces asexually by producing autospores, where each spore develops into a cell of the new coenobium. Flagellated stages and sexual reproduction have not been observed.
