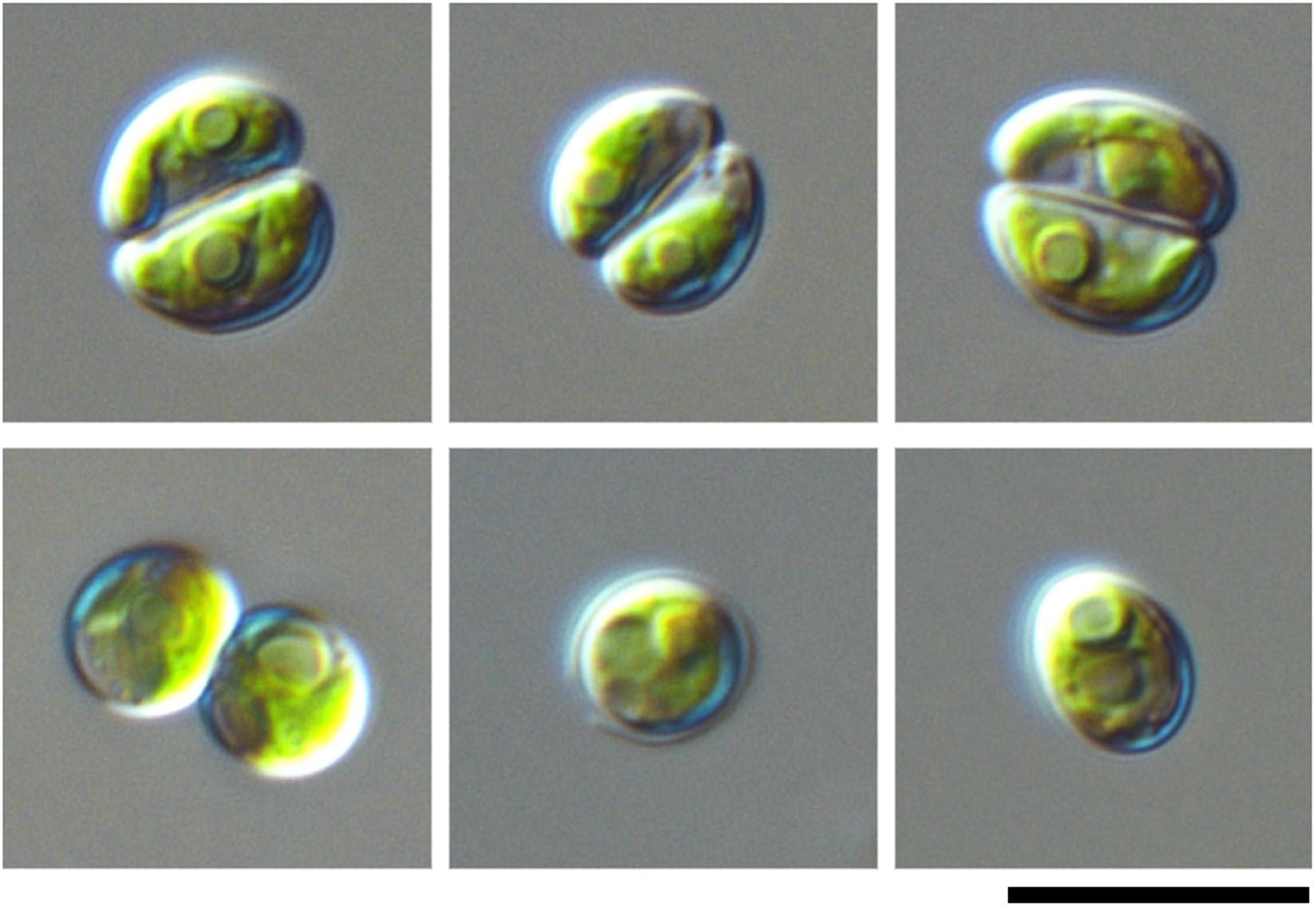
- Pseudodidymocystis spp.

Scientific classification
- Domain: Eukaryota
- Clade: Archaeplastida
- Clade: Viridiplantae
- Division: Chlorophyta
- Class: Chlorophyceae
- Order: Sphaeropleales
- Family: Scenedesmaceae
- Genus: Pseudodidymocystis; Hegewald & Deason

Type species
- Pseudodidymocystis planctonica (Korshikov) Hegewald & Deason

Species
- Pseudodidymocystis planctonica

= Pseudodidymocystis =

Genus of algae

Pseudodidymocystis is a genus of green algae in the family Scenedesmaceae.

Pseudodidymocystis consists of single cells or two-celled colonies. When in colonies, the two cells are typically oval to ellipsoidal in shape, whereas single cells are nearly spherical. The cell wall has two layers: a fibrous inner layer and an outer layer of sporopollenin which is often granulated.
