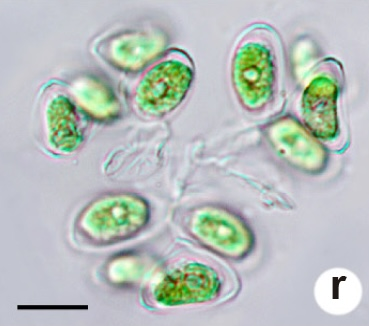
- Dimorphococcus lunatus

Scientific classification
- Kingdom: Plantae
- Division: Chlorophyta
- Class: Chlorophyceae
- Order: Sphaeropleales
- Family: Scenedesmaceae
- Genus: Dimorphococcus; Braun

Type species
- Dimorphococcus lunatus Braun

Species
- Dimorphococcus lunatus

= Dimorphococcus =

Genus of algae

Dimorphococcus is a genus of fresh water green algae in the family Scenedesmaceae. It is found as a component of the phytoplankton of freshwater ponds, lakes, and peat bogs. It is widespread, but usually not very common.

Dimorphococcus is usually found in small colonies of multiples of four cells, surrounded by a gelatinous mass. Groups of four cells are further attached to each other via mucilaginous strands, which are the remnants of the mother cell wall. Cells are kidney-shaped to heart-shaped, 10–25 μm long and 3–8(–15) μm wide. Each cell is uninucleate (containing one nucleus) and has one parietal chloroplast each with one or more pyrenoids.

Dimorphococcus reproduces asexually via autospores, with four spores produced per mother cell. Autospores are released through a lateral tear in the mother cell wall. After release, the empty cell wall gradually dissolves.

== Taxonomy ==
Currently, Dimorphococcus is placed in the family Scenedesmaceae, according to molecular phylogenetic analyses.

One species, Dimorphococcus fritschii, is of uncertain status. The phycologist Chin Chih Jao considered it to have a different structure than other species of Dimorphococcus; accordingly, he placed it into a new genus, Dimorphococcopsis. The species has not been re-investigated and it is possible that the original placement was correct.
