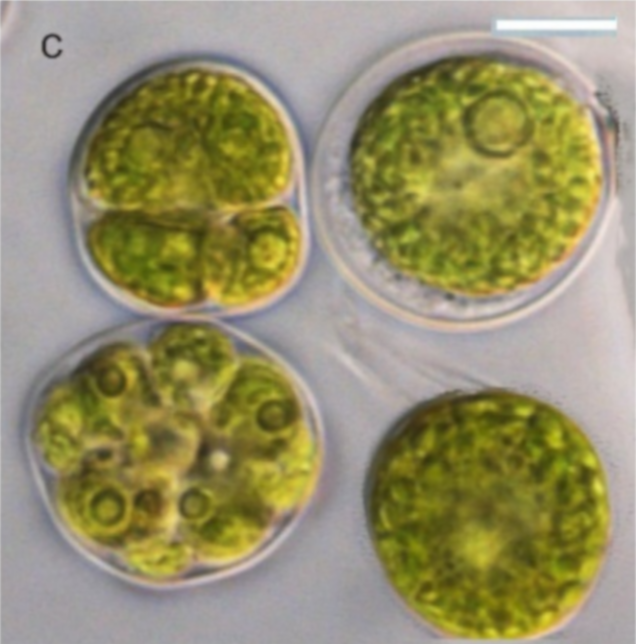
- Asterarcys quadricellulare

Scientific classification
- Kingdom: Plantae
- Division: Chlorophyta
- Class: Chlorophyceae
- Order: Sphaeropleales
- Family: Scenedesmaceae
- Genus: Asterarcys; Comas Gonzales
- Species: A. quadricellularis

Binomial name
- Asterarcys quadricellularis (K.Behre) E.Hegewald & A.W.F.Schmidt

= Asterarcys =

Genus of algae

Asterarcys is a genus of green algae in the family Scenedesmaceae. It contains a single species, Asterarcys quadricellularis, also spelled as Asterarcys quadricellulare.
