= Pole cell =

Cell type in fruit fly development

Pole cells are the cells that form at both the anterior and posterior poles of the Drosophila egg, which begin the adult germ cells. The posterior pole cells will eventually form the germline of the Drosophila. The cytoplasm (also known as pole plasm) in the pole cells both helps the cells bud and can trigger germ cell specialization. Though much of the experimentation on pole cells has slowed, the previous research done has provided answers as to how pole cells are formed and ways to see them using molecular imaging techniques.

== Formation ==
In early Drosophila development, the embryo passes through mitosis (with thirteen nuclear divisions) but without cytokinesis, which results in a multinucleate cell, specifically a coenocyte. The pole plasm assembles at the posterior pole of the Drosophila embryo, allowing determination of the abdominal patterning. This plasm in the pole is different from the plasm that is found in the blastoderm, as it is less dense, but other features of the plasm remain similar. Late in oogenesis, polar organelles, which are electro-negative granules, are in the pole plasm. When the pole plasm further matures, it continues to consist of polar granules through the development of germ cells, which develop into adult germ cells. Trypsin-like and chymotrypsin-like serine protease (types of enzymes that assist in the digestion of proteins) activity occurs less than 2 hours after the budding of the pole cells from the pole plasm, and ending just prior to the movement of the pole cells via gastrulation. The patterning of the pole cells are determined by the activation of oskar, which acts in the determination of body patterning segments. Specifically, long oskar helps keep the mitochondria in the posterior pole, and thus allows the germline to form correctly. The number of pole cells in each organism is dependent on the amount of oskar present in the polar plasm, and though pole cells can give rise to primordial germ cells, not all pole cells will become them. Pole cells begin their migration in a cluster in the midgut primordium. To reach their final destination, pole cells must migrate through the epithelial wall. It is known that the cells migrate through the epithelial wall, but little is known about the mechanisms used to do so. One theory proposed by scientists is that Wun and Wun2 RNAs found in the pole cells creates an environment in the extracellular lipid phosphate substrate that pushes the pole cells out of the substrate, thus moving the pole cells.

Sometimes, pole cells will not form correctly. This can happen because of a multitude of things, for example if oskar is not present in the pole plasm, then the cell will not be able to maintain osk mRNA localization, which means the pole plasm will not produce pole cells. Additionally, should the centrosomes and cytasters (centriole-based collections of microtubules found in the cytoplasm) not function properly, the pole cell will not form. Sometimes, the pole cells will not form because the migration of the posterior pole cells is delayed. The Wun and Wun2 RNAs from the mother of the organism is also essential for the proper development of pole cells, as it affects how well the pole cells will be able to produce germ cells that function. Should any of these happen and the pole cells either do not form or are malformed, the organism's germline would not form correctly or at all.

== Purpose ==
Pole cells primary function is to ensure the proper formation of the germline in adult Drosophila and other organisms that employ pole cells. Should the pole cells not be present or not develop properly, the Drosophila won’t form the proper abdominal or reproductive cells. It is important that the germline develops correctly because the germline is what allows the organism to reproduce and pass their traits on to the next generation. In order to make sure that all parts of the Drosophila develop properly, a molecular gradient is created with RNAs. Learning about pole cells in Drosophila is important because it allows scientists to make predictions about the pole cells of other animals, such as frogs, worms, and zebrafish.

== Experimentation ==
Though pole cells have been known since at least the early 1900's, little experimentation has been done and documented as the cells are extremely small and develop very quickly, while also having a shell that is hard to pierce. Some more notable experiments are:

- An experiment was conducted with pole cells to test if a specific intron (3) is spliced in all cells or if it is only spliced in the creation of germ cells. The experiment concluded that the ability to enter the gonads and to splice these introns is only active in certain pole cells. It was also found that the ability to splice and transcribe these genes is essential to the method of differentiating pole cells into primordial germ cells.
- While an experiment to designed to isolate pole cells for further studying was happening, the scientists discovered a way to identify pole cells using autoradiography. The scientists mainly looked at the fact that the pole plasm had no lipids in it. This experiment also found that during the process of pole cell development, both the polar granules and the nuclear bodies will break apart and then spread out, though they are unsure the function of this.
