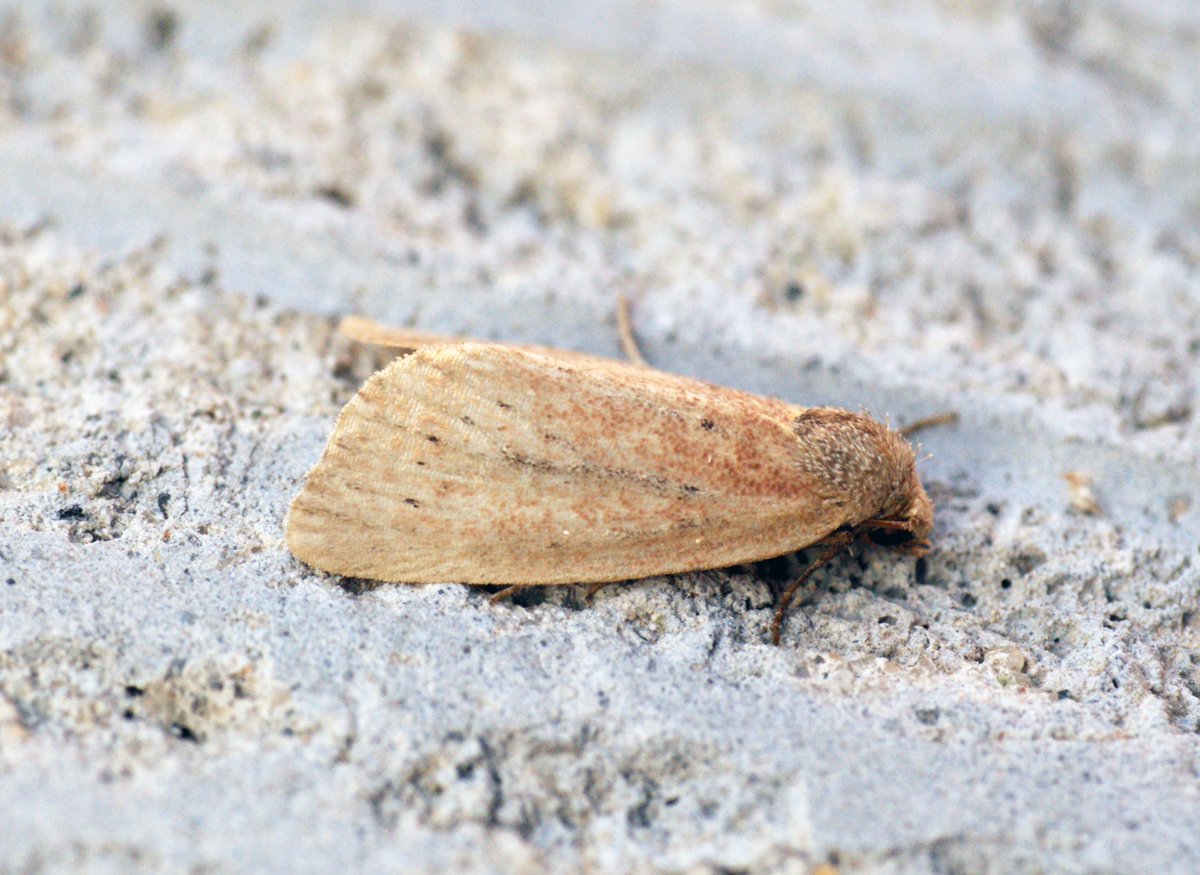

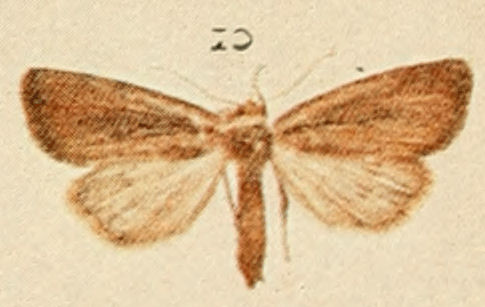

Scientific classification
- Domain: Eukaryota
- Kingdom: Animalia
- Phylum: Arthropoda
- Class: Insecta
- Order: Lepidoptera
- Superfamily: Noctuoidea
- Family: Noctuidae
- Genus: Coenobia
- Species: C. rufa

Binomial name
- Coenobia rufa (Haworth, 1809)

Synonyms
- Phytometra rufa Haworth, 1809; Nonagria despecta Treitschke, 1825; Acosmetia lineola Stephens, 1830 pallescens Tutt

= Coenobia rufa =

Species of moth

The Small Rufous (Coenobia rufa) is a moth of the family Noctuidae. It is found in western and central Europe, Scandinavia and the British Isles.

== Description ==
The wingspan is 22–25 mm. Forewing uniform rufous, with an obscure dark streak from base along middle of wing; a row of outer dots on veins, sometimes hardly visible; hindwing pale, greyer towards termen; in the ab. lineola Stph the forewing is reddish grey; the veins dotted pale and dark grey; the inner and outer lines shown by rows of dots; in pallescens Tutt the red tinge is wholly absent, the forewing being whitish ochreous. •— Larva whitish, dorsally reddish; a dark lateral line, and minute dark dots on each segment; head and plates shining brown.

The moth flies in July and August. The larvae feed on jointed rush (Juncus articulatus) and other rushes. Found in damp swampy places overgrown with rushes; often flying in the afternoon sunshine; the females are rarely taken, resting concealed in the lower parts of the rush clumps.
