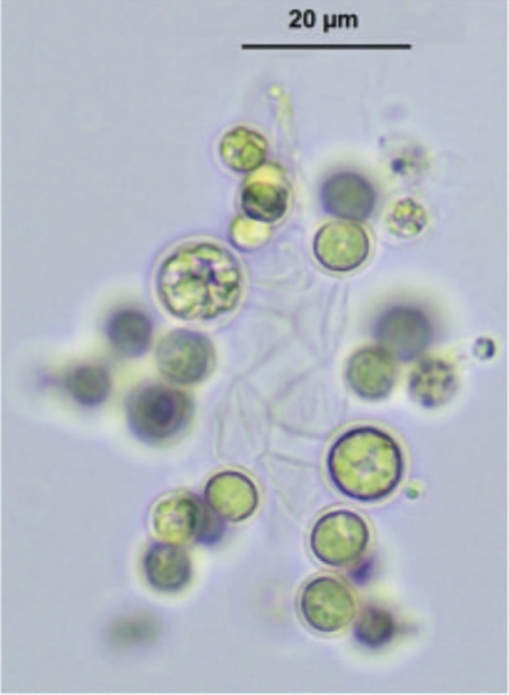
- Westella botryoides

Scientific classification
- Clade: Viridiplantae
- Division: Chlorophyta
- Class: Chlorophyceae
- Order: Sphaeropleales
- Family: Scenedesmaceae
- Genus: Westella; De Wildeman, 1897
- Species: W. botryoides

Binomial name
- Westella botryoides (West) De Wildeman

= Westella =

Genus of algae

Westella is a genus of green algae in the family Scenedesmaceae, containing the sole species Westella botryoides. The species has a cosmopolitan distribution and is planktonic in freshwater rivers and ponds.

Westella botryoides consists of four-celled colonies (termed coenobia) up to 15 μm; these in turn may be joined to form compound colonies consisting of over a hundred cells and reaching up to 90 μm, attached to each other by the remnants of their parental cell walls. The four cells are typically arranged in a square, spherical but flattened when in contact with other cells. The cell walls are smooth; cells are uninucleate with a single, parietal chloroplast containing one pyrenoid.

Two similar genera are Westellopsis and Coccoidesmus. Westellopsis differs in having chloroplasts without pyrenoids and usually cells arranged in a line, while Coccoidesmus has cells arranged in a tetrahedral formation.
