= Coelastrella terrestris =

Scientific classification
- Clade: Viridiplantae
- Division: Chlorophyta
- Class: Chlorophyceae
- Order: Sphaeropleales
- Family: Scenedesmaceae
- Genus: Coelastrella
- Species: C. terrestris

Binomial name
- Coelastrella terrestris (Reisigl) Hegewald & N.Hanagata

Species of alga

Coelastrella terrestris is an algae species in the genus Coelastrella.
