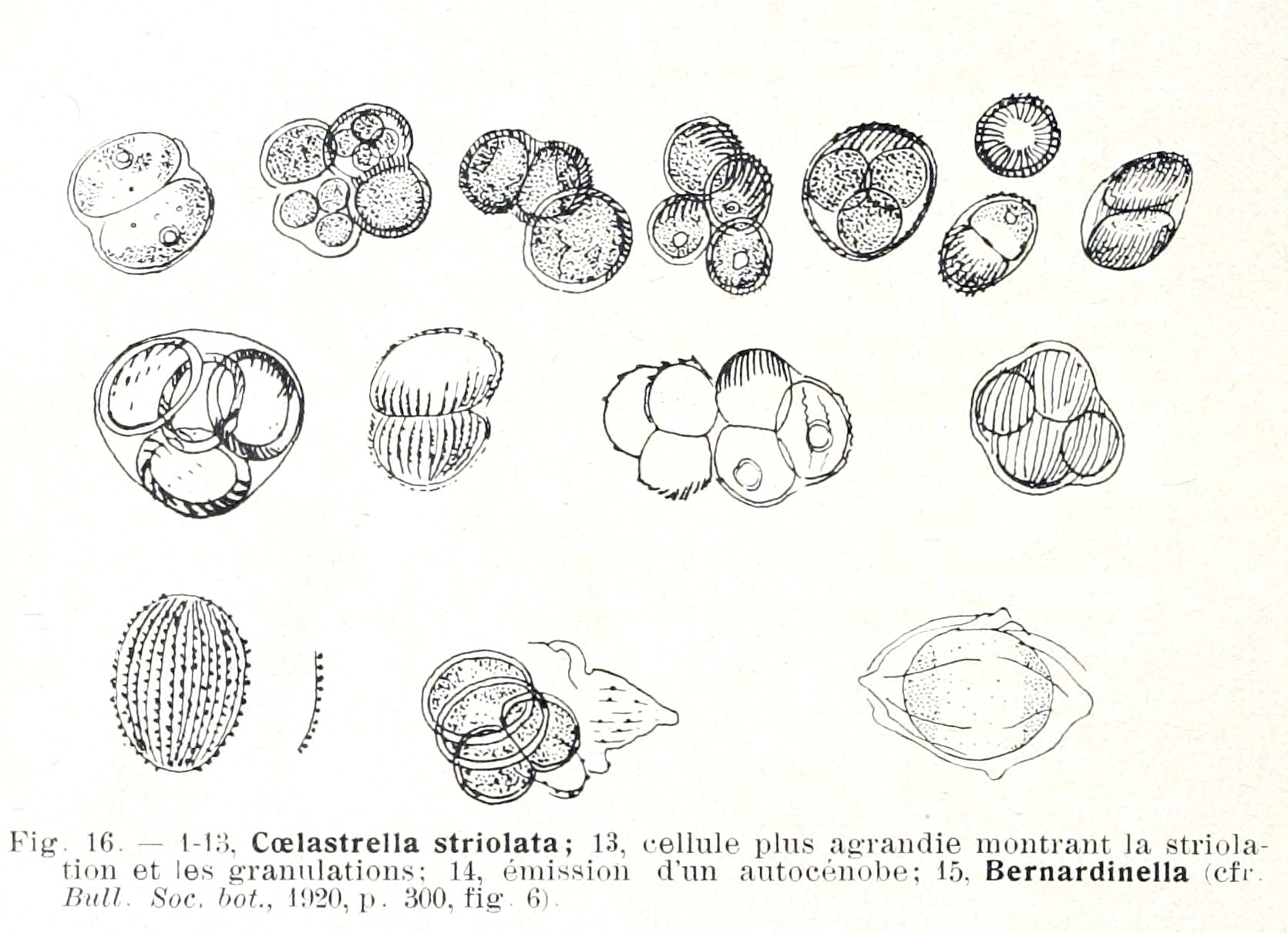
- Coelastrella striolata

Scientific classification
- Kingdom: Plantae
- Division: Chlorophyta
- Class: Chlorophyceae
- Order: Sphaeropleales
- Family: Scenedesmaceae
- Genus: Coelastrella; Chodat

Type species
- Coelastrella striolata Chodat

Species
- Coelastrella aeroterrestrica; Coelastrella multistriata; Coelastrella saipanensis; Coelastrella striolata; Coelastrella terrestris

Synonyms
- Scotiellopsis Vinatzer

= Coelastrella =

Genus of algae

Coelastrella is a genus of green algae in the family Scenedesmaceae. It is currently classified in the subfamily Coelastroideae.

Coelastrella consists of solitary cells or clusters of a few cells. Cells are spherical to ellipsoidal or lemon-shaped, and are surrounded by a hyaline or brownish cell wall with 4 to 40 longitudinal striations. Cells contain numerous conspicuous vacuoles. Each cell contains one nucleus and a single parietal chloroplast, each with one pyrenoid. When mature, cultures may form a deep red color due to the presence of pigments in the cells.

A distinctive identifying feature of Coelastrella are the longitudinal striations on the cell walls. These are often only visible under scanning electron microscopy (SEM). Due to the scarcity of morphological characteristics visible under light microscopy, species of this genus have generally been overlooked.

Coelastrella reproduces asexually by the formation of autospores, which are released by a tear in the mother cell wall. Coelastrella has not been observed to undergo sexual reproduction, or exhibit life stages with flagella.

== Habitat ==
Coelastrella species are distributed all around the world, from the tropics to the poles. They mostly occupy aerophytic habitats, such as soils, tree trunks, and on rocks. They also inhabit freshwater habitats. One strain of Coelastrella is thermotolerant and can withstand temperatures of 50 °C for over eight hours.

== Taxonomy ==
The genus Coelastrella includes species formerly included in the genus Scotiellopsis. Species classified Scotiella were distinguished by their lemon-shaped cells and fewer longitudinal ribs. However, molecular data demonstrated that the two genera were conspecific. The taxonomic status of one species, Scotiellopsis levicostata, is unclear because there is no known strain for this species.

== Biotechnology ==
Coelastrella strains are the subject of recent research, because they produce high amounts of useful compounds. Coelastrella is typically grown on Bold's basal medium (BBM). Examples of useful products of Coelastrella species include carotenoids suchas astaxanthin, or lipids such as linoleic acid. The lipids may also be used for bioenergy purposes.

In addition to chemical production, Coelastrella has capacity for bioremediation or wastewater treatment.
