= Ambush hypothesis =

Concept in molecular genetics regarding misreading of genes

The ambush hypothesis is a hypothesis in the field of molecular genetics that suggests that the prevalence of “hidden” or off-frame stop codons in DNA selectively deters off-frame translation of mRNA to save energy, molecular resources, and to reduce strain on biosynthetic machinery by truncating the production of non-functional, potentially cytotoxic protein products. Typical coding sequences of DNA lack in-frame internal stop codons to avoid the premature reduction of protein products when translation proceeds normally. The ambush hypothesis suggests that kinetic, cis-acting mechanisms are responsible for the productive frameshifting of translational units so that the degeneracy of the genetic code can be used to prevent deleterious translation. Ribosomal slippage is the most well described mechanism of translational frameshifting where the ribosome moves one codon position either forward (+1) or backward (-1) to translate the mRNA sequence in a different reading frame and thus produce different protein products.

In respect to codon usage, the ambush hypothesis theorizes that there is a positive correlation between the use of a codon and the amount a codon contributes to hidden stops. Phylogenetic analyses of both the nuclear and mitochondrial genomes of all major taxonomic kingdoms suggests ubiquitous off-frame stop codon existence and a positive correlation between the usage frequency of a codon and the number of ways a codon can contribute to hidden stop codons in different translational reading frames.

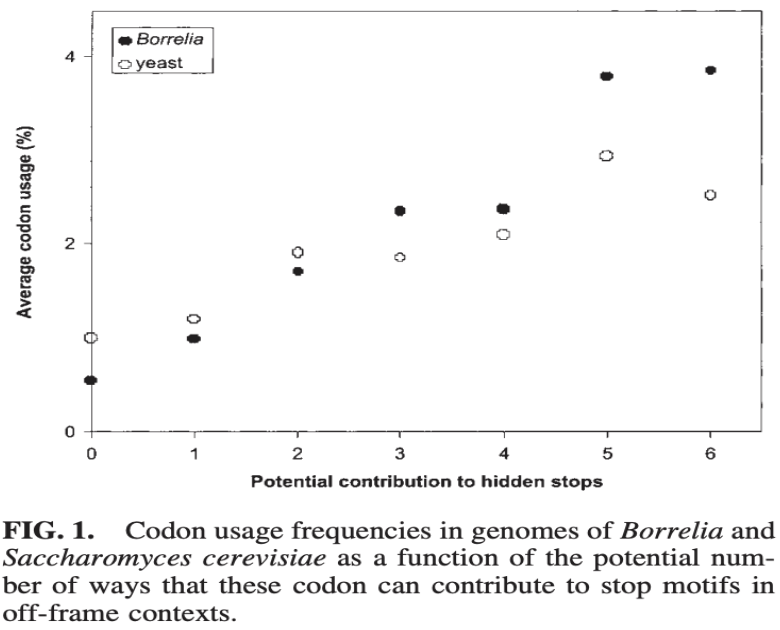
Figure 1. (Seligmann & Pollock 2004) demonstrates association between codon usage frequency and potential contribution to off-frame stop codons

Combinatorics have been used across genetic codes to determine how each in-frame codon can potentially contribute to stop codons in off-frame contexts. The standard genetic code only contains 20 codons that cannot become stop codons in a frameshifted ribosomal environment (-1 frameshift: 42, +1 frameshift: 28) and 127 out of the 400 (31.75%) possible adjacent amino acid combinations in the vertebrate mitochondrial code creates an off-frame stop codon. This suggests that substitutions and synonymous codon usage are not neutral and that selective pressures might have readjusted codon assignments to increase the frequencies of those that can be used as hidden stops.

Observations that the number of off-frame stop codons is positively correlated with the expression level of a gene support the ambush hypothesis by increasing translational regulation (hidden stop frequency) to discourage off-frame reading in genes that are expressed at a high level. The positive correlation indicates that the off-frame translation of larger genes with higher expression levels likely costs a cell more energy, resources, and pathway efficiency than translating smaller, more rare genes in a shifted reading frame. Off-frame stop codon frequency is negatively correlated with gestation time in primates and though there are many factors that link molecular translational efficiency to the rate of morphogenesis, these findings suggests that not only individual cells but entire organisms may benefit from the development of hidden stop codons to effectively halt off-frame synthesis.

The ambush hypothesis is challenged by recent observations that off-frame stop codons are directly correlated with the GC content in the genome because stop codons are GC-poor. Morgens et al. 2013 argues that previous research concerning the ambush hypothesis has relied on codon usage data which is representative of the GC content of an organism and thus not appropriate to evaluate the selective effect of off-frame stop codons.
