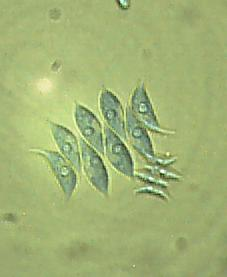

Scientific classification
- Clade: Viridiplantae
- Division: Chlorophyta
- Class: Chlorophyceae
- Order: Sphaeropleales
- Family: Scenedesmaceae
- Genus: Tetradesmus
- Species: T. lagerheimii

Binomial name
- Tetradesmus lagerheimii M.J.Wynne & Guiry

= Tetradesmus lagerheimii =

Species of alga

Tetradesmus lagerheimii is a green alga in the family Scenedesmaceae. It is also known by its synonym, Scenedesmus acuminatus.

Tetradesmus lagerheimii forms colonies of two, four or eight cells in a single row, with cells arranged linearly or in a somewhat zig-zag fashion. The colony is typically curved, semicircular, or contorted. Cells are spindle-shaped, arc-like, or sigmoid, 9.2–34.5(–40) μm long and 2–5.5 μm wide; the outermost side is concave; both ends taper to a point.

It is a very common species, and is found in a variety of freshwater habitats.
