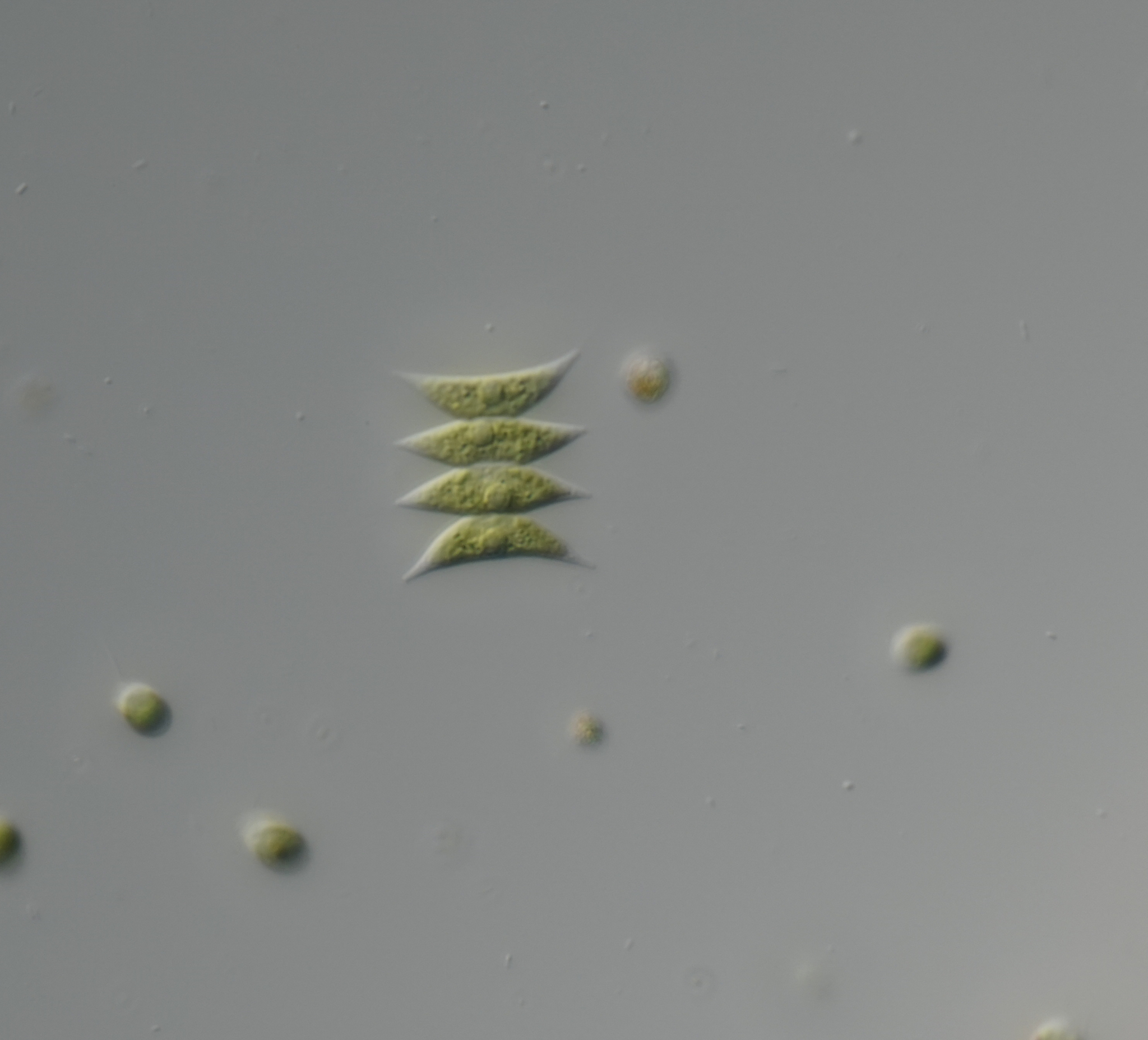

Scientific classification
- Kingdom: Plantae
- Division: Chlorophyta
- Class: Chlorophyceae
- Order: Sphaeropleales
- Family: Scenedesmaceae
- Genus: Tetradesmus
- Species: T. dimorphus

Binomial name
- Tetradesmus dimorphus (Turpin) M.J.Wynne, 2016

Synonyms
- Scenedesmus dimorphus (Turpin) Kützing; Scenedesmus obliquus (Turpin) Kützing

= Tetradesmus dimorphus =

Species of alga

Tetradesmus dimorphus is a freshwater unicellular green algae in the class Chlorophyceae. The name means "having two forms".

Tetradesmus dimorphus consists of colonies of two, four or eight cells, which are arranged linearly or in a zigzag fashion, in one or two rows. Cells are (5–)6–25(–27) μm long and 2–9.4(–14) μm wide, broadly spindle-shaped, tapered to points at both ends. The inner cells are straight, while marginal cells have ends that are slightly curved outwards.

== Synonyms ==
=== Basionym ===
- Achnanthes dimorpha Turpin

=== Homotypic synonyms ===
- Achnanthes dimorpha Turpin, 1828
- Scenedesmus obliquus var. dimorphus (Turpin) Hansgirg
- Scenedesmus acutus var. dimorphus (Turpin) Rabenhorst
- Scenedesmus dimorphus (Turpin) Kützing

=== Heterotypic synonyms ===
- Scenedesmus antennatus Brébisson in Ralfs
- Scenedesmus costulatus Chodat
- Scenedesmus acutus var. obliquus Rabenhorst

== See also ==
- Algaculture
