= A textbook of general botany =

1924 botany book

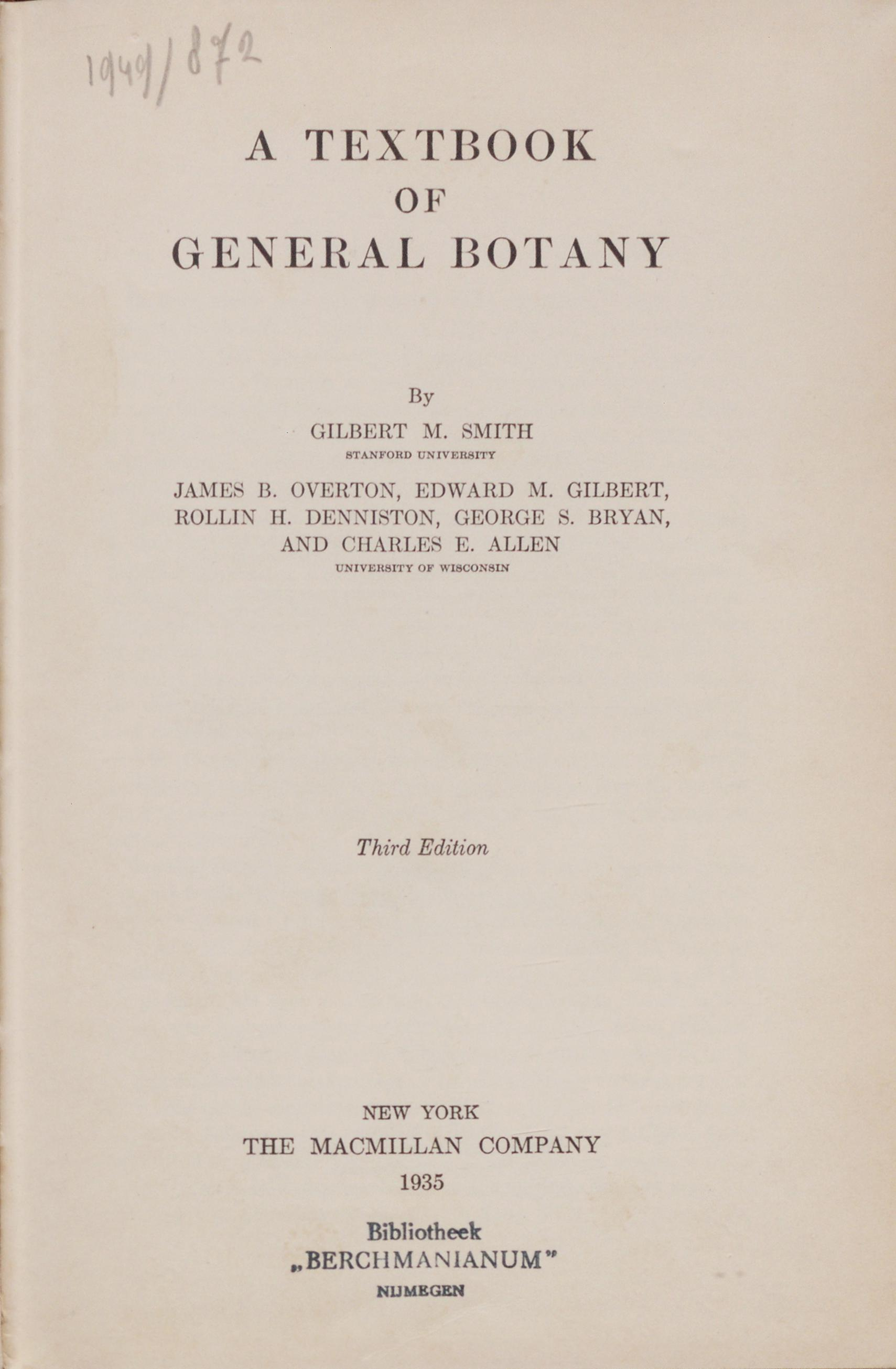
- Title page of the book
- Author: Gilbert M. Smith, James B. Overton, Edward M. Gilbert, Rollin H. Denniston, George S. Bryan, Charles E. Allen
- Language: English
- Genre: non-fiction
- Published: 1924
- Publication place: United States

A textbook of general botany is a botany book first published in 1924 by Gilbert M. Smith (1885 – 1959), James B. Overton, Edward M. Gilbert, Rollin H. Denniston, George S. Bryan and Charles E. Allen. The textbook gives a broad introduction to the various elements and concepts of general botany.

== Context ==
Before the late 19th century most American botanist and botanical studies were amateurish, which led to the creation of the Botanical Society of America. With developments in microscopy and methodologies, like staining, the study of botany moved from the field to the laboratory. The new laboratory methods in botany which were prevalent especially in Germany quickly moved to the United States, where they shone a light into areas such as plant anatomy, cytology, genetics, pathology and morphology. These methods quickly changed the understanding of plants. In the United States there were a series of institutional changes that incentivised the study of plants. These include the Morrill Act in 1862 which gave grants for the study and teaching of agricultural sciences, the demand of American universities for studies in the life sciences, the creation of botanical research gardens and natural history museums and government agricultural agencies. The scientific interest in botany was greatly increasing by the end of the 19th century, including in the University of Wisconsin where Smith and his colleagues were teaching. While in 1879 there was only one biology department, by the end of the century it had branched out into four distinct departments, including the department of botany created in 1883. Before the creation of the botany department, botany was introduced in the curriculum in 1856, as "Botany, Zoology, etc.". American botanists aimed to get some independence from British and German botanists and to establish the same level of expertise. In the beginning of the 20th century this was even more apparent, American scientists were having more difficulty in publishing in German journals and the outbreak of the first World War made it distasteful. The increased interest in Botany lead to creation of multiple botanical departments in universities across the United States.

During the 19th and 20th century there was a great increase in botanical research, interest and teaching, but despite these increases the literature used to teach botany was still of poor quality according to Smith and the co-authors. This made them decide to create The Textbook of General Botany, one of the first textbooks to present botany in a more comprehensive and understandable language and containing more advanced illustrations for beginner botany students.

=== Authors ===
The authors mentioned below were experts in their respective fields of botany and were responsible for that part of the textbook. They gained their knowledge while teaching elementary botany at the University of Wisconsin. It is not clear who wrote which chapter in the book and the authors would meet and produce the textbook together. With this book, the authors aimed to assist first-year students in understanding the concepts of general botany.

==== Gilbert M. Smith ====
Gilbert M. Smith first started to gain interest in biology in his undergraduate career in Beloit College, and it is here that he decided to follow a career in botany. In order to continue a graduate career in botany, Smith had to teach at the Wisconsin high school. However, after realising that he could not finance his work by teaching he received an Assistantship in Botany at the University of Wisconsin. Here Smith gained a significant interest in algae and this would be the main focus of his career. Smith also refined his botanical illustration and his laboratory skills. In 1911 Smith published his paper about a new genus of algae he had identified. Later Smith received a Ph.D and was awarded an instructorship in botany at the University of Wisconsin, where continued his research into algae and plankton. Smith completed “Phytoplankton of the Inland Water of Wisconsin” part 1 (1919) and part 2 (1924), which have become books of great value. During his time at the University of Wisconsin Smith had teaching responsibilities. Smith and the co-authors believed that the books used to teach were of poor value. The authors believed that, especially in the beginning, botany should be presented as a unit and that technical terms should be avoided if possible. This is why each topic, along with its different concepts, is explained by means of an abundant or well-known species to build connections to the already existing knowledge of the student. Smith took on the responsibility of creating more and better botanical illustrations than those found in other textbooks of that time. The textbook went through four more editions, as the textbook was refined at the end of each school year. Smith also had the responsibility of editing the textbooks, which included the addition of new images or editing chapters.

==== Edward M. Gilbert ====
Edward M. Gilbert was a prominent name in mycology, phytopathology and botany since the 1920s. Gilbert completed his graduate work at the University of Wisconsin where his main interest was in mycological research. In 1922 he became the Professor of Botany and Plant Pathology at the University of Wisconsin. His greatest interest became fungal cytology and he would go on to study fungal diseases of a citrus aphid and plant pathogenic fungi.

==== James B. Overton ====
James B. Overton began to work as a botany instructor in the University of Wisconsin in 1904. Later he became the professor of plant physiology. Overton was one of the first people to study the parthenogenesis in plants and gave an explanation to this phenomenon. He continued with studies about meiosis, the formation of spores and nuclear organisation. Overton successfully induced the pathogenesis under controlled conditions of the Fucus genus. During and after the publishing to A Textbook of General Botany, Overton published a series of studies with Gilbert Smith.

==== Rollin H. Denniston ====
Rollin H. Denniston graduated in pharmacy at the University of Wisconsin and then completed his doctorate in botany in 1904. He began teaching as an assistant in pharmacy, which included the responsibility of the drug museum, comprising many botanical pharmaceuticals. Denniston's main interest was in pharmacy, including drugs of botanical origin. He became the assistant professor of botany in 1907. Denniston also published about anatomy and taxonomy.

==== Charles E. Allen ====
Charles E. Allen was studying at the University of Wisconsin and became especially interested in the taxonomy of bryophytes, however his only published work was on liverworts. Later his interest became in cytology and for many years that was the center of his research. Allen’s role during the writing of A Textbook of General Botany was editing and also as a writer. As a writer Allen would point out grammatical errors, statements that could lead to misinterpretation and broad generalisations in the texts and also bring everyone’s point of view into a single statement that would satisfy all the members.

==== George S. Bryan ====
George S. Bryan was a professor of Botany at the University of Wisconsin. He published papers about the reproduction and cellular development of plants.

== Content ==
The book contains 34 chapters on 409 pages, where each chapter discusses the foundations of a particular element of general botany. It serves as an introduction to general botany and gives the reader an overview of how botanical fields were explored at the time of publication. Smith and the co-authors understood that technical vocabulary in a scientific textbook is unavoidable but burdened an introductory student. They emphasized avoiding unnecessary scientific jargon to make this textbook as comprehensible as possible. Illustrations in every chapter assist the written content. With a few exceptions, all of the drawings were prepared by G. M. Smith.

The first six chapters provide information about the general make-up of a plant and then focus on the different plant structures like roots, stems, buds and leaves. The following chapters (7-12) discuss transpiration, photosynthesis, respiration, and other cellular processes along with the structures involved. Chapters 13-30 discuss the different plant taxa in their chronological order of development, according to the phylogenetic consensus at the time of publication. Starting with algae and bacteria and ending with gymno- and angiosperms. Chapters 31 and 32 cover inheritance, variation and evolution in the context of botany. They mention Mendel’s theories and different types of evidence for evolution. The last two chapters (33 and 34) discuss the geographic distribution and the economic significance of plants in North America. The last chapter contains maps displaying the distribution of economically relevant plants, like crops.

== Publications ==
In total there are five editions of the textbook. All of them were published between 1924 and 1953.

The book underwent some noticeable changes between the first and third edition (published in 1935), as the third edition contains 35 chapters on 574 pages. The chapters about Plastids and Pigments as well as Slime Molds were removed and two additional chapters were included (How Materials Enter and Leave the Cell and Classification of Plants). The chapters about algae were split into four separate ones about blue, blue-green, brown and red algae.

Even though the book has been edited several times, it does not seem to have been translated.

== Reception ==
Smith et al.'s textbook was well-received by its public, especially students and teachers. The book was unique due to its thorough and detailed yet easily understandable writing style. It was larger than many other botany textbooks at the time, including a vast range of topics beyond the scope of most books on general botany. The textbook was alternatively known as the "Wisconsin textbook" and was considered one of the most successful modern botany texts. In over a dozen years, it effectively established itself as a standard in the field of botanical teaching.

With every new edition, improvements were praised. Integrating physiological and functional aspects with the structural and morphological aspects aided in students' understanding of botany. Each edition contained new illustrations that were highly accurate in detail and proportion and showed depth and perspective. This was a considerable improvement over botanical drawings in other elementary botany textbooks.

Some criticised the book for its conservative viewpoint in teaching comparative morphology, arguing that it was "written for the convenience of the teacher rather than for the information of the student". A textbook in general botany did not present any problem-solving section, question, exercise, or laboratory information for students, which was a significant issue for an educational textbook. It seems however that it was the case of most textbooks at the time.

Other critics were reported on the scientific content of the book, such as the absence of historical material about science and the lack of sufficient information about life cycles and reproductive features of the described species.

As of 2022, the field of botany has considerably evolved. Without becoming completely erroneous, most of the information provided by this textbook might have become imprecise. Research about algae, lichens, mosses, fungi and bacteria, has led to structural changes in the phylogenetic classification. Thanks to progress in cellular and molecular biology, the metabolism of plants and their diseases are better understood. New species have been discovered, and with them, unique characteristics, chemical substances, and behaviors.

A textbook in general botany can be found in many libraries worldwide. A 1935 copy of the book is available as part of the Maastricht University Special Collections, the heritage library of Maastricht University. Numerous digital copies are accessible online though no reviews of this textbook have been published online.
