= Gilbert Morgan Smith =

American botanist (1885–1959)

- Born: January 6, 1885; Beloit, Wisconsin, United States
- Died: July 11, 1959 (aged 74); Palo Alto Hospital, California (Menlo Park, home)
- Education: Beloit College, University of Wisconsin
- Known for: Phycology (Algology)
- Spouse: Helen Pfuderer
- Awards: Gold Medal of Botanical Society of America, past-president and 18 years research on Monterey Bay Algae
- Scientific career
- Fields: Botany, Phycology
- Workplaces: Stanford University, University of Wisconsin, Pomona College
- Notable students: Paul Silva
- Author abbrev. (botany): G.M.Sm.

Gilbert Morgan Smith (6 January 1885, Beloit, Wisconsin – 11 July 1959) was a botanist and phycologist, who worked primarily on the algae. He was best known for his books, particularly the Freshwater Algae of the United States, the Marine Algae of the Monterey Peninsula and the two volumes of Cryptogamic Botany.

== Career ==
Smith was born on 6 January 1885 to Elizabeth Mayher Smith and Erastus G. Smith in Beloit, Wisconsin, where his father was Professor of Chemistry at the College. His parents were both born in Massachusetts and educated there, at Mt. Holyoke College and Amherst College respectively. Smith attended Beloit College, where he concentrated on botany and chemistry, and graduated in 1907. He taught science at the high school in Stoughton, Wisconsin for the next two years, before beginning graduate studies at the University of Wisconsin in 1909, where he started work on the algal genus Oedogonium. He interrupted his studies for a one-year teaching appointment at Pomona College in 1910–1911. In 1913 he completed his PhD and also married Helen Pfuderer. He remained in the Botany Department at Wisconsin, where he continued to work on algae, especially desmids, eventually reaching the position of associate professor. He was invited to Stanford University for 1923–1924, and in 1925 became Professor of Botany there. In 1924 he wrote together with his colleagues a botany textbook, A textbook of general botany, which gives a broad introduction to the various elements and concepts of general botany. In 1950 he became Emeritus Professor, but remained scientifically active until his death on 11 July 1959.

The standard author abbreviation G.M.Sm. is used to indicate this person as the author when citing a botanical name.

== Eponymy ==
Several species and genera of algae have been named in honor of Gilbert M. Smith:

- Gilbertsmithia M.O.P. Iyengar
- Smithiella B.P. Skvortsov
- Smithimastix B.P. Skvortsov
- Smithora G.J. Hollenberg
- Hymenena smithii Kylin
- Gymnogongrus smithii Taylor
- Pseudostaurastrum smithii Bourrelly
- Chlamydomonas smithiana Pascher
- Dactylococcopsis smithii R. & F. Chodat
- Tetradesmus smithii Prescott
- Debarya smithii Transeau
- Gloeochloris smithiana Pascher
- Polysiphonia flaccidissima var. smithii Hollenberg

== See also ==
- Gilbert Morgan Smith Medal
- Smith system, his taxonomic system (published in Cryptogamic Botany)
