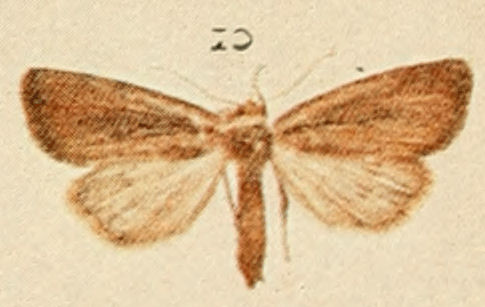
- Coenobia rufa

Scientific classification
- Domain: Eukaryota
- Kingdom: Animalia
- Phylum: Arthropoda
- Class: Insecta
- Order: Lepidoptera
- Superfamily: Noctuoidea
- Family: Noctuidae
- Genus: Coenobia; Stephens, 1850

= Coenobia (moth) =

Genus of moths

Coenobia is a genus of moths of the family Noctuidae.

== Species ==
- Coenobia orientalis Sugi, 1982
- Coenobia rufa (Haworth, 1809)
