= Scenedesmus obliquus mitochondrial code =

Alternative genetic code

The Scenedesmus obliquus mitochondrial code (translation table 22) is a genetic code found in the mitochondria of Scenedesmus obliquus, a species of green algae.

== Code ==
AAs = FFLLSS*SYY*LCC*WLLLLPPPPHHQQRRRRIIIMTTTTNNKKSSRRVVVVAAAADDEEGGGG
Starts = -----------------------------------M----------------------------
Base1 = TTTTTTTTTTTTTTTTCCCCCCCCCCCCCCCCAAAAAAAAAAAAAAAAGGGGGGGGGGGGGGGG
Base2 = TTTTCCCCAAAAGGGGTTTTCCCCAAAAGGGGTTTTCCCCAAAAGGGGTTTTCCCCAAAAGGGG
Base3 = TCAGTCAGTCAGTCAGTCAGTCAGTCAGTCAGTCAGTCAGTCAGTCAGTCAGTCAGTCAGTCAG

Bases: adenine (A), cytosine (C), guanine (G) and thymine (T) or uracil (U).

Amino acids: Alanine (Ala, A), Arginine (Arg, R), Asparagine (Asn, N), Aspartic acid (Asp, D), Cysteine (Cys, C), Glutamic acid (Glu, E), Glutamine (Gln, Q), Glycine (Gly, G), Histidine (His, H), Isoleucine (Ile, I), Leucine (Leu, L), Lysine (Lys, K), Methionine (Met, M), Phenylalanine (Phe, F), Proline (Pro, P), Serine (Ser, S), Threonine (Thr, T), Tryptophan (Trp, W), Tyrosine (Tyr, Y), Valine (Val, V)

== Differences from the standard code ==
DNA codons	RNA codons	This code (22)	Standard code (1)
TCA	UCA	STOP = Ter (*)	Ser (S)
TAG	UAG	Leu (L)	STOP = Ter (*)

== Systematic range and comments ==
- Scenedesmus obliquus

== See also ==
- List of genetic codes
