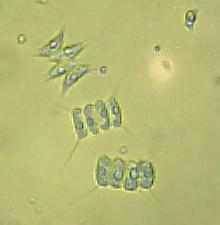

Scientific classification
- Clade: Viridiplantae
- Division: Chlorophyta
- Class: Chlorophyceae
- Order: Sphaeropleales
- Family: Scenedesmaceae; Oltmanns, 1904

Genera
- See text

= Scenedesmaceae =

Family of algae

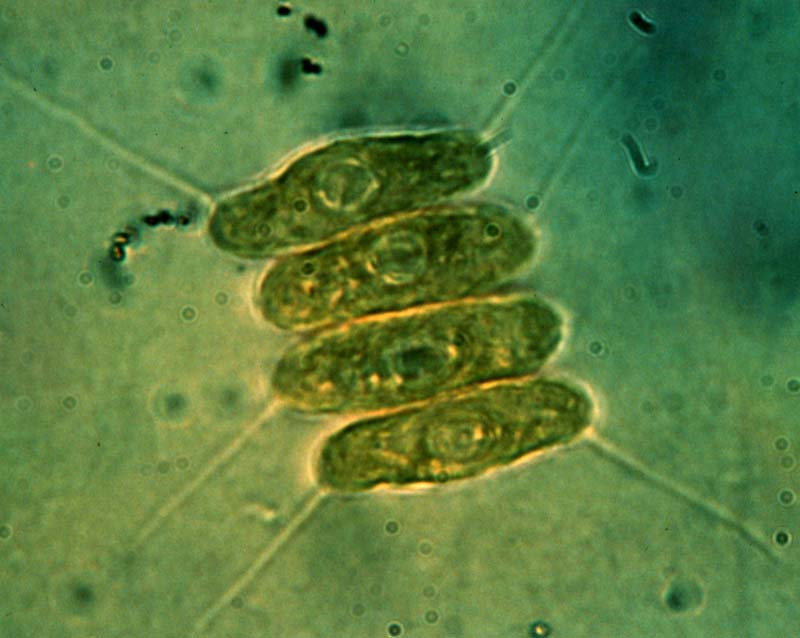
Green algae, Scenedesmus

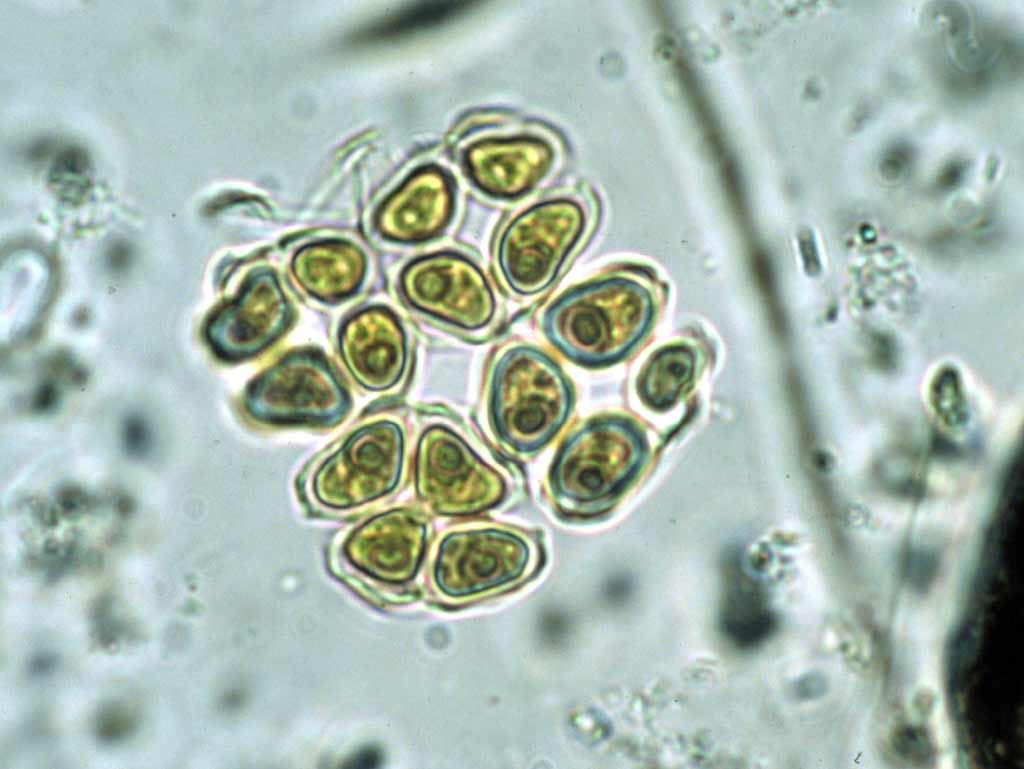
Green algae, Crucigenia

Scenedesmaceae is a family of green algae in the order Sphaeropleales. Scenedesmus algae are commonly found in freshwater plankton. The former family Coelastraceae is considered a synonym of Scenedesmaceae.

The family has existed since at least the Cretaceous period, as evidenced by amber deposits from France containing the genus Enallax.

== Description ==
Algae in the family Scenedesmaceae consist of coenobia with flat or curved shapes, or sometimes three-dimensional clusters.

== Genera ==
Genera in this family include:

- Acutodesmus
- Asterarcys
- Astrocladium
- Chodatodesmus
- Closteriococcus
- Coelastrella
- Coelastropsis
- Coelastrum
- Comasiella
- Crucigeniopsis
- Danubia
- Desmodesmus
- Dimorphococcus
- Enallax
- Flechtneria
- Gilbertsmithia
- Hariotina
- Hofmania
- Hylodesmus
- Komarekia
- Lauterborniella
- Neodesmus
- Pectinodesmus
- Pseudodidymocystis
- Pseudotetrastrum
- Scenedesmus
- Schistochilium
- Schmidledesmus
- Schroederiella
- Scotiellopsis
- Soropediastrum
- Staurogenia
- Steinedesmus
- Tetradesmus
- Tetrallantos
- Tetranephris
- Tetrastrum
- Truncatulus
- Verrucodesmus
- Westella
- Westellopsis
- Willea
- Yadavaea
