= Coenocyte =

Type of cell structure in several groups of organisms

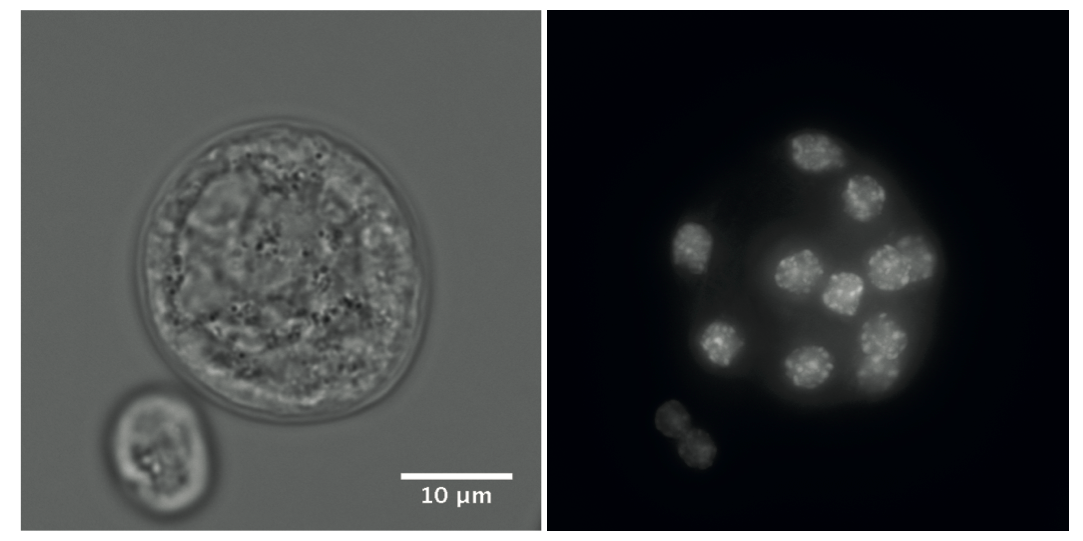
Coenocyte of Sphaeroforma arctica

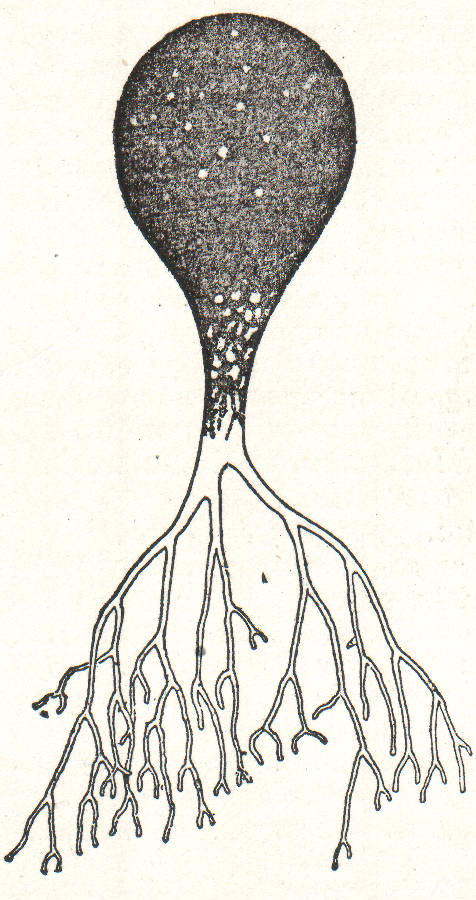
Botrydium, showing a coenocytic body

A coenocyte (/ˈsiːnəˌsaɪt/) is a multinucleate cell which can result from multiple nuclear divisions without their accompanying cytokinesis, in contrast to a syncytium, which results from cellular aggregation followed by dissolution of the cell membranes inside the mass. The word syncytium in animal embryology is used to refer to the coenocytic blastoderm of invertebrates. A coenocytic colony is referred to as a coenobium (pl.: coenobia), and most coenobia are composed of a distinct number of cells, often as a power of two (4, 8, etc.).

Research suggests that coenobium formation may be a defense against grazing in some species.

== Physiological examples ==
=== Protists ===
Diplomonads, like Giardia, have two nuclei.

Ciliates have cells that contain two nuclei: a macronucleus and a micronucleus.

The schizont of apicomplexan parasites is a form of a coenocyte (i.e. a plasmodium in the general sense) as well as the plasmodia of microsporidian (Fungi) and myxosporidian (Metazoa) parasites.

The trophont of syndinean (Dinoflagellata) parasites.

Xenophyophorea are giant cells with numerous nuclei, and is common on the abyssal plains.

==== Algae ====
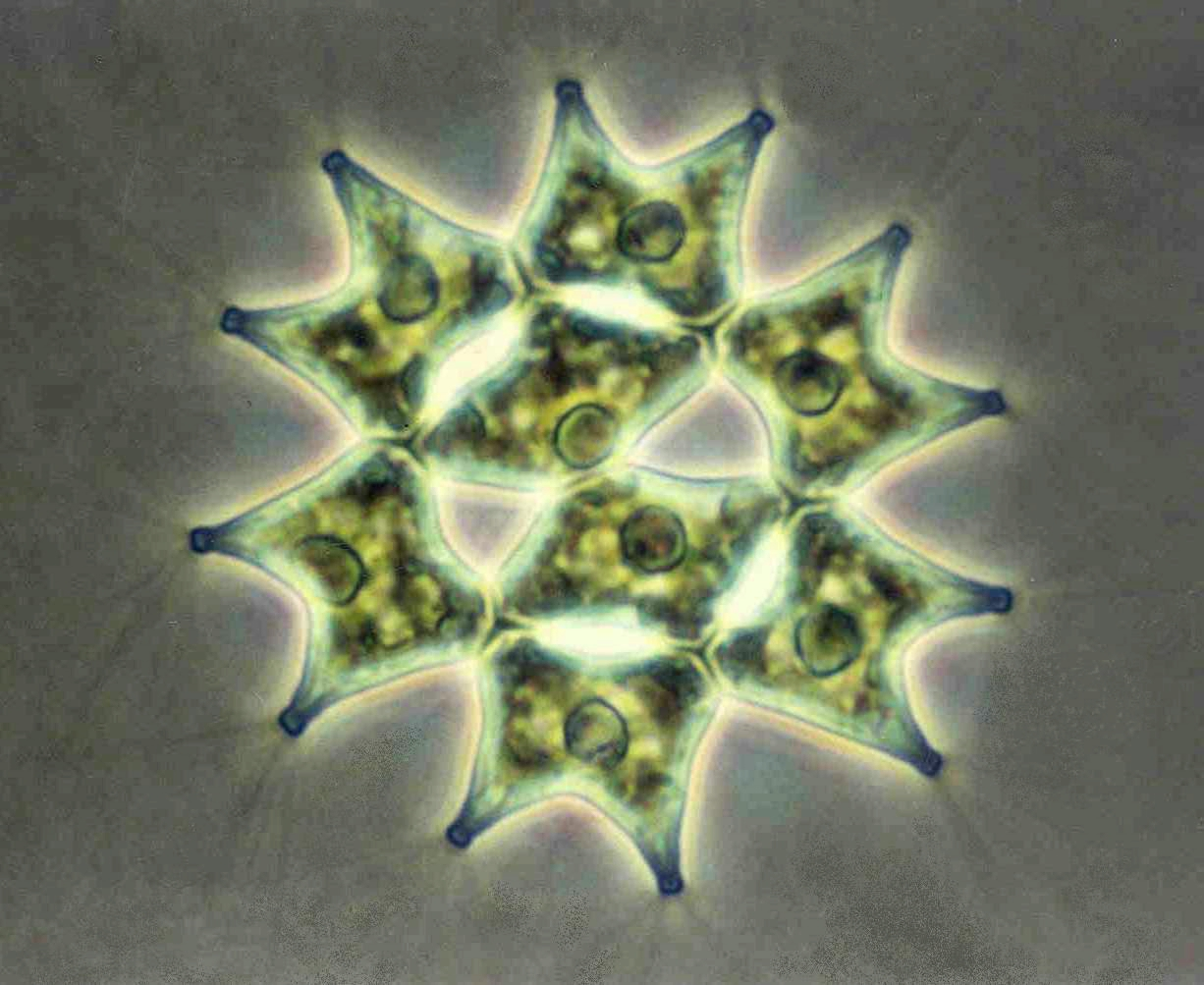
An eight-celled colony of Pediastrum duplex

Coenocytic cells are present in diverse and unrelated groups of algae, including Xanthophyceae (e.g., Vaucheria), red algae (e.g., Griffithsia) and green algae (e.g., the internodal cells of Chara).

In the siphonous green algae Bryopsidales and some Dasycladales, the entire thallus is a single multinucleate cell, which can be many meters across (e.g. Caulerpa). However, in some cases, crosswalls may occur during reproduction.

The green algal order Cladophorales is characterized by siphonocladous organization, i.e., the thalli are composed of many coenocytic cells.

In contrast to the Cladophorales where nuclei are organized in regularly spaced cytoplasmic domains, the cytoplasm of Bryopsidales exhibits streaming, enabling transportation of organelles, transcripts and nutrients across the plant.

The Sphaeropleales also contain many common freshwater genera that are coenocytic, such as Scenedesmus, Hydrodictyon, and Pediastrum.

==== Myxogastrids (slime molds) ====
See Plasmodium (life cycle).

=== Plants ===
The endosperm in plants begins to grow when one fertilized cell (the primary endosperm cell) becomes a coenocyte. Different species produce coenocytes with different numbers of nuclei before the PEC eventually begins to subdivide, with some growing to contain thousands of nuclei.

=== Fungi ===
Some filamentous fungi (such as Glomeromycota, Chytridiomycota and Neocalligomastigomycota) may contain multiple nuclei in a coenocytic mycelium. A coenocyte functions as a single coordinated unit composed of multiple cells linked structurally and functionally, i.e. through gap junctions. Fungal mycelia in which hyphae lack septa are known as "aseptate" or "coenocytic".

=== Metazoans: invertebrates ===
Many insects, such as the model organism Drosophila melanogaster, lay eggs that initially develop as "syncytial" blastoderms, i.e. early on the embryos exhibit incomplete cell division. The nuclei undergo S-phase (DNA replication) and sister chromatids get pulled apart and re-assembled into nuclei containing full sets of homologous chromosomes, but cytokinesis does not occur. Thus, the nuclei multiply in a common cytoplasmic space.

The early embryo "syncytium" of invertebrates such as Drosophila is important for "syncytial" specification of cell differentiation. The egg cell cytoplasm contains localized mRNA molecules such as those that encode the transcription factors Bicoid and Nanos. Bicoid protein is expressed in a gradient that extends from the anterior end of the early embryo, whereas Nanos protein is concentrated at the posterior end. At first, the nuclei of the early embryo rapidly and synchronously divide in the "syncytial" blastoderm and then migrate through the cytoplasm and position themselves in a monolayer around the periphery, leaving only a small number of nuclei in the center of the egg, which will become yolk nuclei. The position of the nuclei along the embryonic axes determines the relative exposure of different amounts of Bicoid, Nanos, and other morphogens. Those nuclei with more Bicoid will activate genes that promote differentiation of cells into head and thorax structures. Nuclei exposed to more Nanos will activate genes responsible for differentiation of posterior regions, such as the abdomen and germ cells. The same principles hold true for the specification of the dorso-ventral axis – higher concentration of nuclear Dorsal protein on the ventral side of the egg specify the ventral fate, whereas absence thereof allows dorsal fates. After the nuclei are positioned in a monolayer underneath the egg membrane, the membrane begins to slowly invaginate, thus separating the nuclei into cellular compartments; during this period, the egg is called a cellular blastoderm. The pole cells – the germline anlage – are the first cells to separate fully.

== Pathological examples ==
Certain mutations and the activation of certain cell-cycle control genes can lead to bacteria forming "filament-like" cells with multiple chromosomes but without cellular division. These mechanisms or mistakes may lead to a similar structure to a coenocyte, though bacteria do not possess nuclei.

This fact has been used in certain synthetic biology applications, for example, to create cell-derived fibers for an organically grown concrete.

== Etymology ==
As with much international scientific vocabulary, English got the word coenocyte (cœnocyte) from Neo-Latin, in which its combining forms, coeno- + -cyte, are based on ancient Greek: κοινός (koinós) = "common" + κύτος (kýtos) = "box, i.e. cell"). The stressed vowel is œ, which in scientific English usually sounds like long e and usually shifts a preceding c to be soft; this explains how there is a degree of regularity in "how one gets a "see-no" sound from coeno-," which might seem irregular at first glance.

== See also ==
- Colony (biology)
- Plasmodium (life cycle)
- Syncytium
  - Dikaryon
