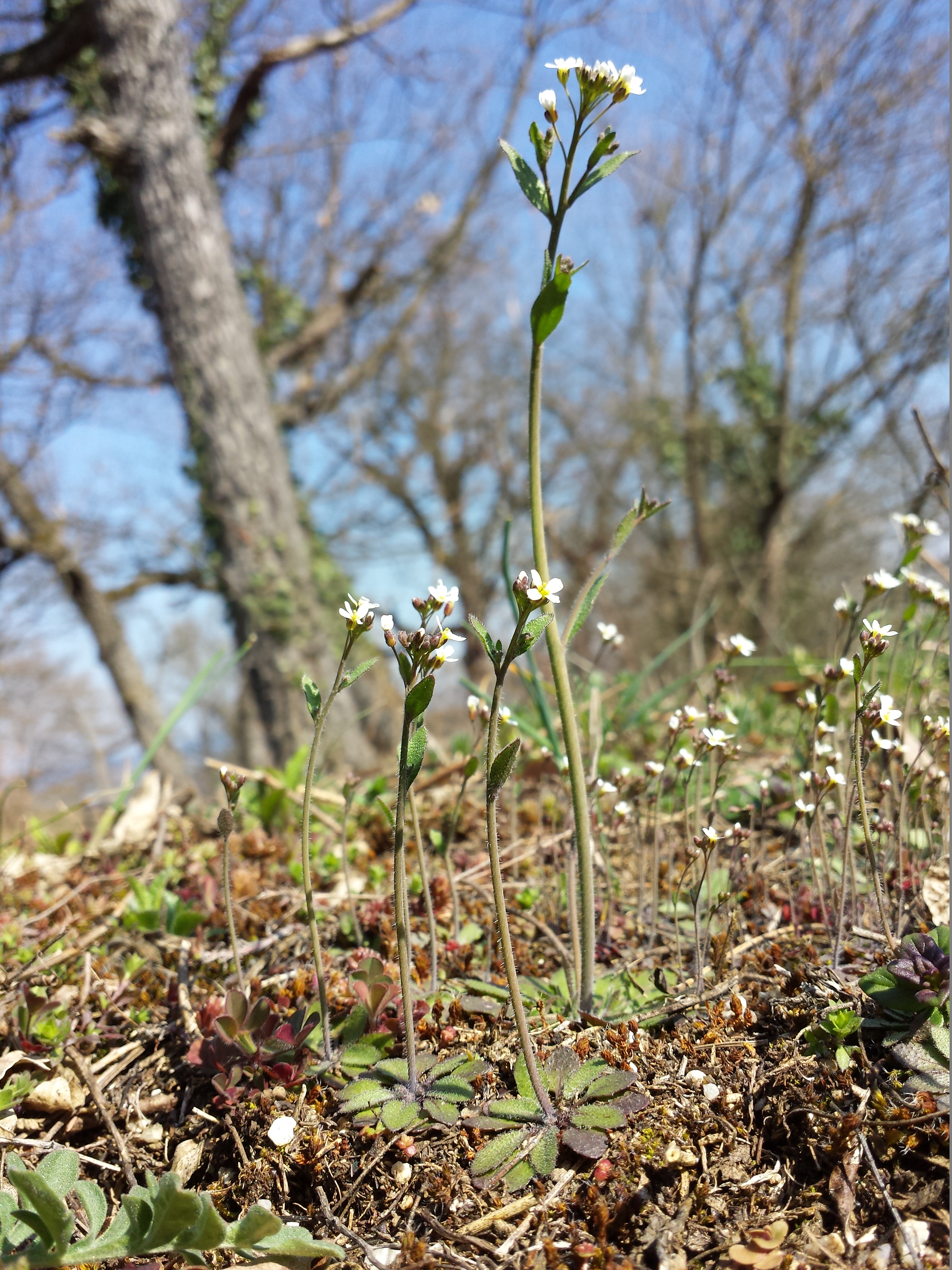
- Thale cress (Arabidopsis thaliana)

Scientific classification
- Kingdom: Plantae
- Clade: Tracheophytes
- Clade: Angiosperms
- Clade: Eudicots
- Clade: Rosids
- Order: Brassicales
- Family: Brassicaceae
- Genus: Arabidopsis; Heynh. in Holl & Heynh.

Type species
- Arabidopsis thaliana L.

Species
- See text

Synonyms
- Cardaminopsis (C.A.Mey.) Hayek; Euxena Calest.; Hylandra Á.Löve; Pilosella Kostel. ex Rydb.; Stenophragma Čelak.

= Arabidopsis =

Genus of flowering plants

Arabidopsis (rockcress) is a genus of small flowering plants in the cabbage and mustard family, Brassicaceae. Arabidopsis species are native to temperate and subarctic Eurasia and North America, North Africa, and the mountains of eastern tropical Africa. This genus is of great interest since it contains thale cress (Arabidopsis thaliana), one of the model organisms used for studying plant biology and the first plant to have its entire genome sequenced. Changes in thale cress are easily observed, making it a very useful model.

== Status ==
12 species of Arabidopsis are currently accepted, and a further eight subspecies recognised. This delimitation is quite recent and is based on morphological and molecular phylogenies by O'Kane and Al-Shehbaz and others.

Their findings confirm the species formerly included in Arabidopsis made it polyphyletic. The most recent reclassification moved two species previously placed in Cardaminopsis and Hylandra and three species of Arabis into Arabidopsis, but moved 50 previous Arabidopsis species into the new genera Beringia, Crucihimalaya, Ianhedgea, Olimarabidopsis, and Pseudoarabidopsis.

In the last two decades, Arabidopsis thaliana has gained much interest from the scientific community as a model organism for research on numerous aspects of plant biology. The Arabidopsis Information Resource (TAIR) is a curated online information source for Arabidopsis thaliana genetic and molecular biology research, and The Arabidopsis Book is an online compilation of invited chapters on Arabidopsis thaliana biology. (Note that as of 2013 no further chapters will be published.) In Europe, the model organism resource centre for Arabidopsis thaliana germplasm, bioinformatics and molecular biology resources (including GeneChips) is the Nottingham Arabidopsis Stock Centre (NASC) whilst in North America germplasm services are provided by the Arabidopsis Biological Resource Center (ABRC) based at Ohio State University. The ordering system for ABRC was incorporated into the TAIR database in June 2001 whilst NASC has always (since 1991) hosted its own ordering system and genome browser.

In 1982, the crew of the Soviet Salyut 7 space station grew some Arabidopsis, thus becoming the first plants to flower and produce seeds in space. They had a life span of 40 days. Arabidopsis thaliana seeds were taken to the Moon on the Chang'e 4 lander in 2019, as part of a student experiment. As of May 2022 Arabidopsis thaliana has successfully been grown in samples of lunar soil.

Arabidopsis is quite similar to the Boechera genus.

== List of species and subspecies ==
12 species are accepted.

- Arabidopsis arenicola (Richardson ex Hook.) Al-Shehbaz, Elven, D.F. Murray & S.I. Warwick — Arctic rock cress – Greenland, Labrador, Nunavut, Québec, Ontario, Manitoba, Saskatchewan
- Arabidopsis arenosa (L.) Lawalrée – sand rock cress
  - A. arenosa subsp. arenosa – Europe: native in Austria, Belarus, Bosnia Herzegovina, Bulgaria, Croatia, Czech Republic, NE France, Germany, Hungary, N Italy, Latvia, Lithuania, Macedonia, Poland, Romania, Slovakia, Slovenia, Switzerland, and Ukraine; naturalized in Belgium, Denmark, Estonia, Finland, Netherlands, Norway, Russia and W Siberia, and Sweden; absent in Albania, Greece, C and S Italy, and Turkey
  - A. arenosa subsp. borbasii – E Belgium, Czech Republic, NE France, Germany, Hungary, Poland, Romania, Slovakia, Switzerland, Ukraine, doubtfully occurring in Denmark
- Arabidopsis cebennensis (DC.) – SE France
- Arabidopsis croatica (Schott) – Bosnia, Croatia
- Arabidopsis drassiana Naqshi & Javeid – western Himalayas
- Arabidopsis halleri (L.)
  - A. halleri subsp. halleri – Austria, Croatia, Czech Republic, Germany, N and C Italy, Poland, Romania, Slovakia, Slovenia, Switzerland, and S Ukraine. Probably introduced in N France and extinct in Belgium
  - A. halleri subsp. ovirensis (Wulfen) – Albania, Austria, NE Italy, Romania, Slovakia, Slovenia, SW Ukraine, Yugoslavia
  - A. halleri subsp. gemmifera (Matsumura) – Russian Far East, northeastern China, Korea, Japan, and Taiwan
- Arabidopsis lyrata (L.) O'Kane & Al-Shehbaz — sand cress
  - A. lyrata subsp. lyrata – NE European Russia, Alaska, Canada (Ontario west into British Columbia), and southeastern and central United States (Vermont south into northern Georgia and Mississippi northward into Missouri and Minnesota)
  - A. lyrata subsp. petraea (Linnaeus) O'Kane & Al-Shehbaz – Austria, Czech Republic, England, Germany, Hungary, Iceland, Ireland, N. Italy, Norway, Russia (NW Russia, Siberia and Far East), Scotland, Sweden, Ukraine, boreal North America (Alaska and Yukon). Apparently extinct in Poland
  - A. lyrata subsp. kamchatica (Fischer ex D.C.) O'Kane & Al-Shehbaz – boreal Alaska, Canada (Yukon, Mackenzie District, British Columbia, northern Saskatchewan), Aleutian Islands, eastern Siberia, the Russian Far East, Korea, northern China, Japan and Taiwan
- Arabidopsis neglecta (Schult.) – Carpathian Mountains (Poland, Romania, Slovakia, and adjacent Ukraine)
- Arabidopsis pedemontana (Boiss.) – northwestern Italy and presumably extinct in adjacent SW Switzerland
- Arabidopsis petrogena (A.Kern.) V.I.Dorof. – Slovakia to Romania
- Arabidopsis suecica (Fries) Norrlin – Fennoscandinavia and the Baltic region
- Arabidopsis thaliana (L.) Heynh. — thale cress; native to almost all Europe to central Asia, now naturalized worldwide

=== Reclassified species ===
The following species previously placed in Arabidopsis are not currently considered part of the genus.

- A. bactriana → Dielsiocharis bactriana
- A. brevicaulis → Crucihimalaya himalaica
- A. bursifolia → Beringia bursifolia
- A. campestris → Crucihimalaya wallichii
- A. dentata → Murbeckiella pinnatifida
- A. drassiana →
- A. erysimoides → Erysimum hedgeanum
- A. eseptata → Olimarabidopsis umbrosa
- A. gamosepala → Neotorularia gamosepala
- A. glauca → Thellungiella salsuginea
- A. griffithiana → Olimarabidopsis pumila
- A. himalaica → Crucihimalaya himalaica
- A. huetii → Murbeckiella huetii
- A. kneuckeri → Crucihimalaya kneuckeri
- A. korshinskyi → Olimarabidopsis cabulica
- A. lasiocarpa → Crucihimalaya lasiocarpa
- A. minutiflora → Ianhedgea minutiflora
- A. mollis → Beringia bursifolia
- A. mollissima → Crucihimalaya mollissima
- A. monachorum → Crucihimalaya lasiocarpa
- A. mongolica → Crucihimalaya mongolica
- A. multicaulis → Arabis tibetica
- A. novae-anglicae → Neotorularia humilis
- A. nuda → Drabopsis nuda
- A. ovczinnikovii → Crucihimalaya mollissima
- A. parvula → Thellungiella parvula
- A. pinnatifida → Murbeckiella pinnatifida
- A. pumila → Olimarabidopsis pumila
- A. qiranica → Sisymbriopsis mollipila
- A. richardsonii → Neotorularia humilis
- A. russeliana → Crucihimalaya wallichii
- A. salsugineum → Eutrema salsugineum
- A. sarbalica → Crucihimalaya wallichii
- A. schimperi → Robeschia schimperi
- A. stenocarpa → Beringia bursifolia
- A. stewartiana → Olimarabidopsis pumila
- A. stricta → Crucihimalaya stricta
- A. taraxacifolia → Crucihimalaya wallichii
- A. tenuisiliqua → Arabis tenuisiliqua
- A. tibetica → Crucihimalaya himalaica
- A. tibetica → Arabis tibetica
- A. toxophylla → Pseudoarabidopsis toxophylla
- A. trichocarpa → Neotorularia humilis
- A. trichopoda → Beringia bursifolia
- A. tschuktschorum → Beringia bursifolia
- A. tuemurnica → Neotorularia humilis
- A. verna → Drabopsis nuda
- A. virgata → Beringia bursifolia
- A. wallichii → Crucihimalaya wallichii
- A. yadungensis →

== Cytogenetics ==
Cytogenetic analysis has shown the haploid chromosome number (n) is variable and varies across species in the genus:

A. thaliana is n=5 and the DNA sequencing of this species was completed in 2001. A. lyrata has n=8 but some subspecies or populations are tetraploid. Various subspecies A. arenosa have n=8 but can be either 2n (diploid) or 4n (tetraploid). A. suecica is n=13 (5+8) and is an amphidiploid species originated through hybridization between A. thaliana and diploid A. arenosa.

A. neglecta is n=8, as are the various subspecies of A. halleri.

As of 2005, A. cebennensis, A. croatica and A. pedemontana have not been investigated cytologically.

== See also ==
- Calcium signaling in Arabidopsis
