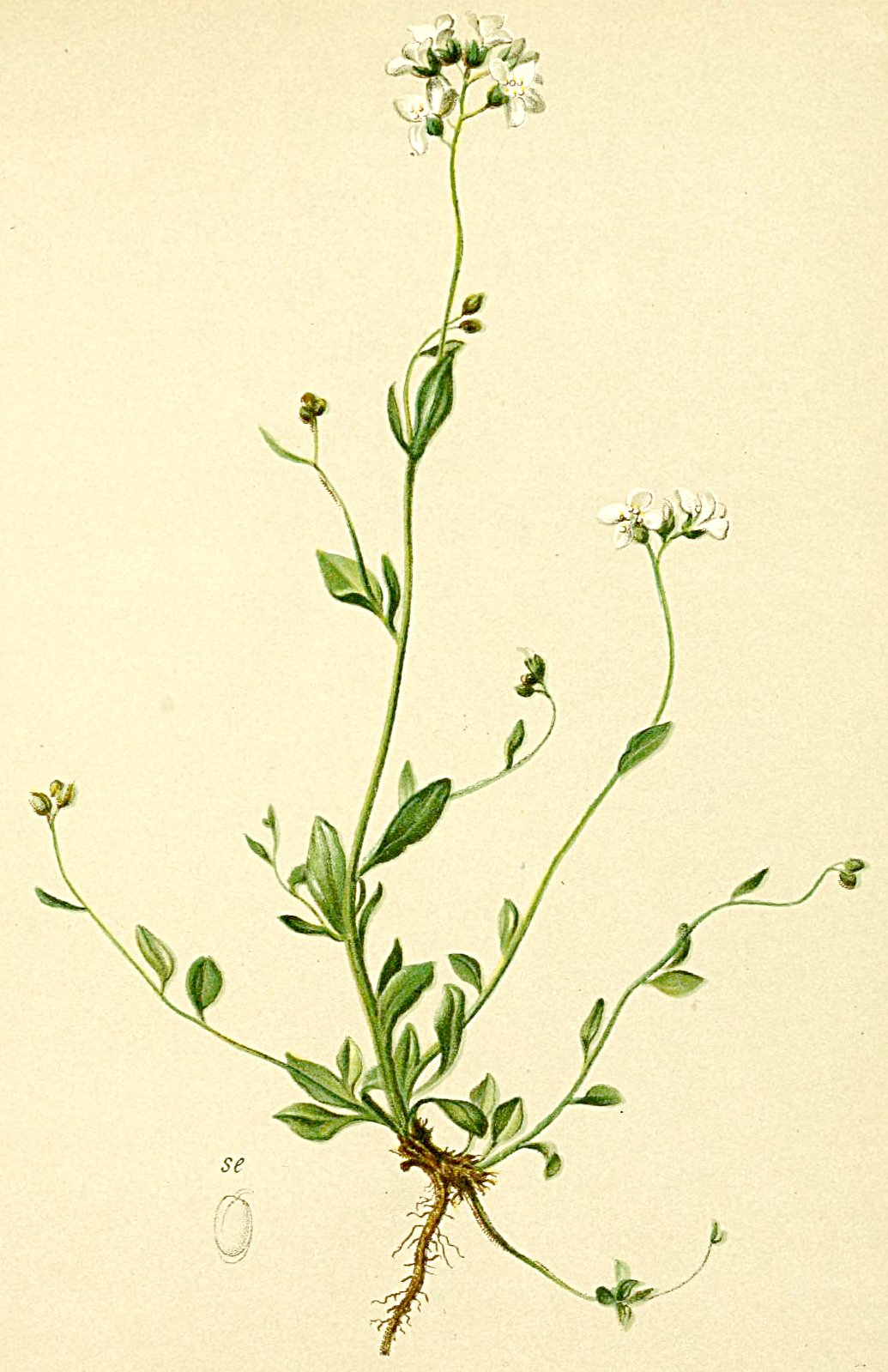
- Illustration from Atlas der Alpenflora (1882)

Scientific classification
- Kingdom: Plantae
- Clade: Embryophytes
- Clade: Tracheophytes
- Clade: Angiosperms
- Clade: Eudicots
- Clade: Rosids
- Order: Brassicales
- Family: Brassicaceae
- Genus: Arabidopsis
- Species: A. halleri

Binomial name
- Arabidopsis halleri (L.) O'Kane & Al-Shehbaz

Synonyms
- Arabis halleri L. (1763) (basionym); Cardamine halleri (L.) Prantl; Cardaminopsis halleri (L.) Hayek; Crucifera halleri (L.) E.H.L.Krause; Erysimum halleri (L.) Kuntze

= Arabidopsis halleri =

Species of flowering plant

Arabidopsis halleri is a species of flowering plant in the family Brassicaceae. It is a perennial native to Central Europe from Germany and Italy to Ukraine, and to Japan, Korea, Manchuria, and the Russian Far East.

== Hyperaccumulation ==
Arabidopsis halleri is a well-known for being able to hyperaccumulate zinc without suffering from phytotoxicity. Research has shown that this same pathway can be used to hyperaccumulate cadium, but the plant does not successfully detoxify the metal.

== Subdivisions ==
Six subspecies and one variety are accepted.

- Arabidopsis halleri subsp. dacica (Heuff. ex Fronius) Kolník – eastern and southern Carpathians and the northern Balkan Peninsula
- Arabidopsis halleri subsp. gemmifera (Matsum.) O'Kane & Al-Shehbaz – Japan, Korea, Manchuria, Russian Far East, and Sakha Republic
- Arabidopsis halleri subsp. halleri – Austria, Czechoslovakia, and Germany
- Arabidopsis halleri subsp. occidentalis Šrámková & Marhold – western and southern Alps (Italy and Switzerland)
- Arabidopsis halleri subsp. ovirensis (Wulfen) O'Kane & Al-Shehbaz – eastern and southeastern Alps (Austria, Italy, and Slovenia)
- Arabidopsis halleri subsp. tatrica (Pawł.) Kolník – western Carpathians (Czechoslovakia and Poland)
- Arabidopsis halleri var. umezawana (Kadota) Yonek. – northern Japan

== Phylogenetics ==
The closest living relatives on are A. kamchatica and A. umezawana. Open Tree of Life recognizes the following relationships:

- - - - - - A. pedemontana (northwestern Italian Alps)
          - A. cebennensis (southeastern France)
        - - A. halleri (Eurasia)
          - - A. kamchatica (amphi-Beringian)
            - A. umezawana
      - - - - A. lyrata (Northern Hemisphere)
            - - A. suecica (Northern Europe)
              - A. croatica (Croatia and northern Bosnia and Herzegovina)
          - - A. neglecta (alpine central and eastern Europe)
            - A. arenosa (Europe)
        - A. petrogena (Carpathian Mountains)
    - - Ballantinia antipoda
      - A. arenicola
  - A. thaliana
