= Calcium signaling in Arabidopsis =

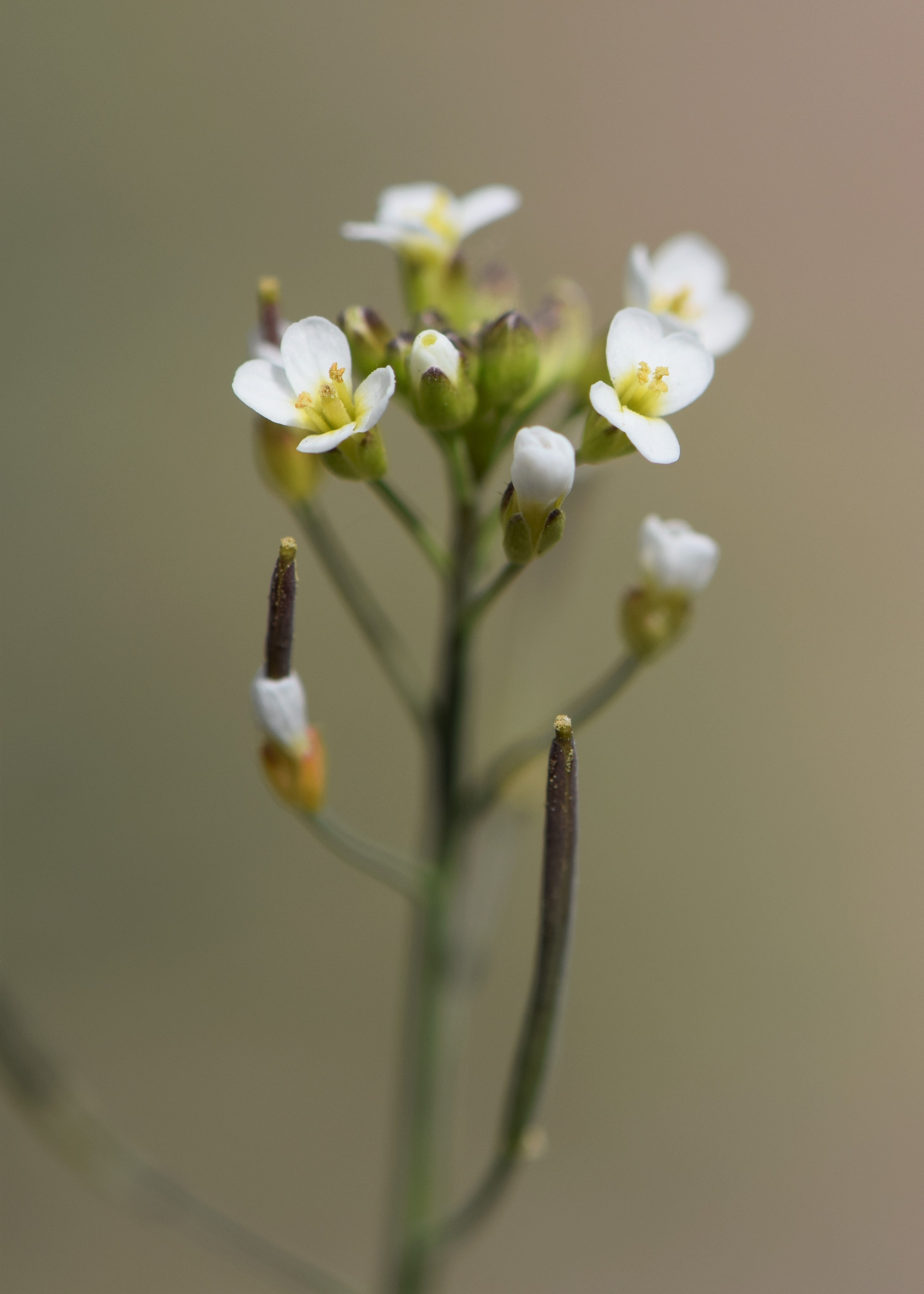
Arabidopsis thaliana

Calcium signaling in Arabidopsis is a calcium mediated signalling pathway that Arabidopsis plants use in order to respond to a stimuli. In this pathway, Ca^{2+} works as a long range communication ion, allowing for rapid communication throughout the plant. Systemic changes in metabolites such as glucose and sucrose takes a few minutes after the stimulus, but gene transcription occurs within seconds. Because hormones, peptides and RNA travel through the vascular system at lower speeds than the plants response to wounds, indicates that Ca^{2+} must be involved in the rapid signal propagation. Instead of local communication to nearby cells and tissues, Ca^{2+} uses mass flow within the vascular system to help with rapid transport throughout the plant. Ca^{2+} moving through the xylem and phloem acts through a “calcium signature” receptor system in cells where they integrate the signal and respond with the activation of defense genes. These calcium signatures encode information about the stimulus allowing the response of the plant to cater towards the type of stimulus.

== Calcium wound/damage response ==
Different kinds of stimuli result in different responses within the Arabidopsis plant. A wound or damage to the plant causes a wound-activated surface potential (WASP) changes that serve as an alert message to undamaged tissues. This wound response results in a plasma membrane depolarization, H+ and Ca^{2+} efflux and K+ influx, causing an action potential. This action potential causes Ca^{2+} cytosolic concentration to increase, therefore sending calcium into the phloem, where the signaling is spread, and as it arrives to systemic tissues. Because of the various stimuli perceived by the plant, abiotic and biotic stress results in different amplitudes, durations, frequencies and localizations of Ca^{2+} concentrations. These “calcium signatures” encode information about the nature of the stimulus and different signatures are sensed by different sensor proteins. With herbivory being an abiotic stressor, Ca^{2+} is sensed by the regulatory ubiquitin protein calmodulin, which phosphorylates JAV1. In turn, it ubiquitinates JAV1 so it no longer inhibits the biosynthesis of JA, giving a rapid increase of the JA hormone. This increase signals the defense system to begin transcribing JA inducible defense genes against herbivory. Alert messages are generated and propagated throughout the plant to undamaged tissues through WASPs, Ca^{2+}, and hormonal signals, such as JA.

== Calcium cold response ==
When an Arabidopsis plant is subjected to cold temperatures, it induces cold response genes. In order for cold genes to be expressed, COLD1 receptors that are present on the plants surface sense the cold temperature and activate Ca^{2+} channels, these channels include: MCA1, MCA2 and other undetermined channels. The activation of Ca^{2+} channels allows for Ca^{2+} to move into the cell and increase cellular Ca^{2+} concentration. The concentration and duration of Ca^{2+} within the cell is determined by the plants acclimation to the temperature, as well as the intensity and length of cold duration. During increased Ca^{2+} concentrations, Ca^{2+} is used as a second messenger to increase the concentration of Ca^{2+} dependent protein kinase (CPKs). During times of increased Ca^{2+} concentrations, Ca^{2+} also binds to calmodulin on the CRLK and AtSR1/CAMTA3. Activation of the CRLK causes an MAPK cascade that activates the MAPK pathway, signaling for the suppression of ICE1 degradation: ICE1 encodes a transcription factor that promotes production of CBF/DREB genes. AtSR1 also binds to the promoter region of CBF and promotes CBF gene expression. CBF and DREB transcription proteins are then synthesized and bind to the promoter of cold induced genes DRE and CRT. Binding to the promoter region of the cold induced genes increases the rate of transcription of cold genes, allowing the Arabidopsis plant to become more acclimated to the cold. This Ca^{2+} signaling cascade, and transcription of cold genes in response to cold temperatures, allows for the plants survival.
