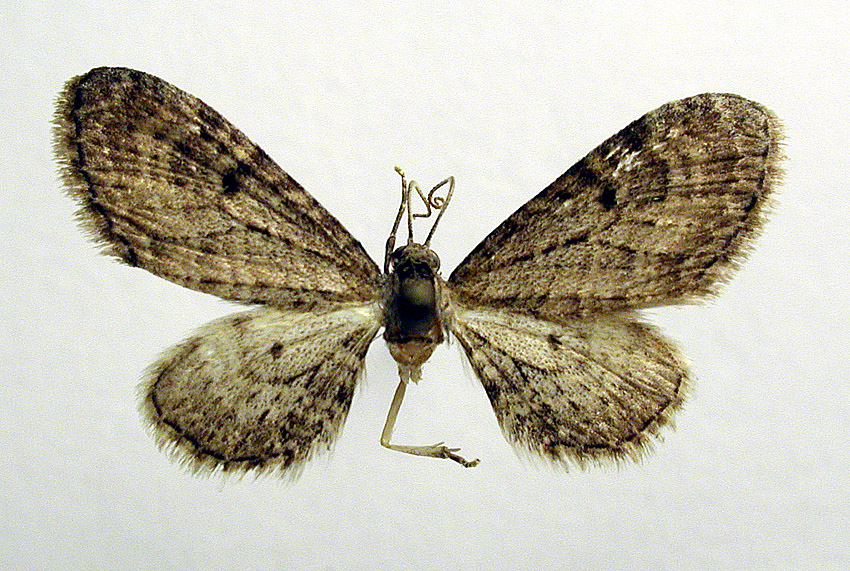

Scientific classification
- Kingdom: Animalia
- Phylum: Arthropoda
- Class: Insecta
- Order: Lepidoptera
- Family: Geometridae
- Genus: Eupithecia
- Species: E. denotata

Binomial name
- Eupithecia denotata (Hübner, 1813)

Synonyms
- Geometra denotata Hubner, 1813; Eupithecia atraria Herrich-Schaffer, 1848; Eupithecia campanulata Herrich-Schaffer, 1861; Eupithecia jasioneata Crewe, 1881; Eupithecia livida Dietze, 1910; Eupithecia primulata Milliere, 1874; Eupithecia pseudocastigata Pinker, 1976

= Eupithecia denotata =

Species of moth

Eupithecia denotata (the campanula pug) is a moth in the family Geometridae. The species can be found across the Palearctic from western Europe to Central Asia and China.

The wingspan is about 20 mm. A glossy brown pug, in general less reddish than absinthiata. The discal dot is rather large but more roundish than elongate. The lines are very weak, even on the costal margin rarely much accentuated, the postmedian often rather better marked, especially on the veins, followed distally by a slightly pale band (double line).The subterminal line is discernible but rather weak, not really white, only a little widened near the hinder angle. The hindwing is paler, rather well marked, especially beneath, where the postmedian is rectangularly bent at 3rd radial. Prout gives an account of the variations.

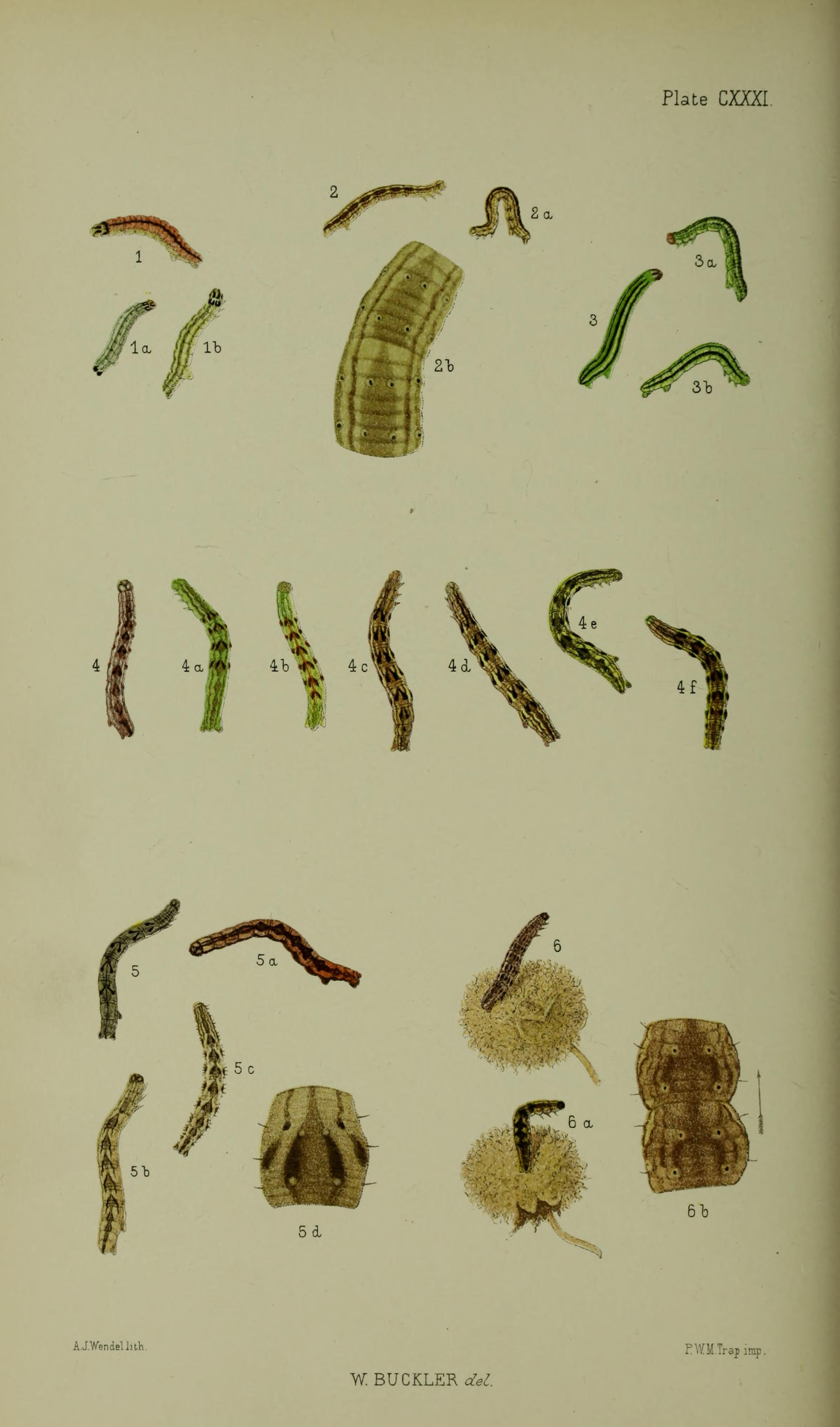
6,6a, larvae after final moult 6b enlarged detail of segments

The larva is relatively powerful, naked and pale brown with diamond-shaped brown spots on the back, these are darker in the outer corners.

There is one generation per year with adults on wing from the beginning of May to August.

The larvae feed on Campanula species, including Campanula trachelium. Larvae of subspecies jasioneata feed on Jasione montana. Larvae can be found from August to October. It overwinters as a pupa.

== Subspecies ==
- Eupithecia denotata denotata
- Eupithecia denotata hellenata Schutze, 1959
- Eupithecia denotata jasioneata Crewe, 1881 - jasione pug
