= Mars Plant Experiment =

Rejected experiment for the Mars 2020 rover

The Mars Plant Experiment (MPX) was an experiment proposed but not selected for the Mars 2020 rover.

It would have tried to germinate and grow 200 Arabidopsis seeds in a small heated greenhouse using an earth-like atmosphere.

== History ==
The Mars Plant Experiment Started way back in 2000. It last all the way up until 2020 when they launched the most recent Mars Rocket.

== Details ==
This experiment was created with hopes of creating sustainable life on Mars in the future. In a forum held in Washington DC, MPX's Deputy Principal Investigator Heather Smith, from NASA's Ames Research Center, discussed the importance of plants on Mars and the future these flora additions may create for humans on the Red Planet. "In order to do a long-term, sustainable base on Mars, you would want to be able to establish that plants can at least grow on Mars" Smith said. "This would be the first step in that... we just send the seeds there and watch them grow." This experiment would basically setup the ability to create colonies on Mars. Space.com states "MPX would employ a clear "CubeSat" box — the case for a cheap and tiny satellite — which would be affixed to the exterior of the 2020 rover. This box would hold Earth air and about 200 seeds of Arabidopsis, a small flowering plant that's commonly used in scientific research. The seeds would receive water when the rover touched down on Mars, and would then be allowed to grow for two weeks or so." The end goal of the experiment was to have small greenhouses on Mars and prove that plants could grow on Mars. Unfortunately when the decision came down to if this experiment would make it on mission or not it got cut and did not make this current rocket launch. Hopefully in the future it will make it on there.
