= Ian Charleson Hedge =

Scottish botanist (1928–2022)

- Born: 18 August 1928; Edinburgh, Scotland
- Died: 7 August 2022 (aged 93)
- Known for: Taxonomy; Ecology; Botany
- Scientific career
- Fields: Botany; Biology; Zoology
- Author abbrev. (botany): Hedge

Ian Charleson Hedge (18 August 1928 – 7 August 2022) was a Scottish botanist at the Royal Botanic Gardens in Edinburgh. Hedge made important contributions to the flora of Iran and Iraq, and was a recognised authority on the flora of south-west Asia. He named more than 300 new plant species.

== Biography ==
Hedge spent seven months collecting in Turkey in 1957 with Peter Davis. Together they gathered more than 6,000 specimens. Then he spent 3 months in Afghanistan with (a Norwegian botanist) Per Wendelbo, they made significant collections to the Garden Herbarium in 1962 in the north and north-east of the country and then he returned in 1969 with Wendelbo and Lars Ekberg. They were one of the first botanists to explore the area.

He described Salvia buchananii in the Botanical Magazine in 1963.

In 1982, he published a book about Salvia's, which recognised up to 86 species.

In 1986, Ian and Professor Karl Rechinger published Plant life of South-West Asia by the Royal Society of Edinburgh, it was dedicated to Karl Heinz Rechinger on his eightieth birthday.

By 1988, he was the curator of the Botanical Garden Herbarium.

He collected in Portugal in the 1990s. Then with Fatima Sales, he published 'Jasione L. taxonomy and phylogeny' in 2002. Also 'Three perplexing names of species of Campanula L.' and 'The taxonomy and conservation of Campanula primulifolia (Campanulaceae), a critically endangered species in the Iberian Peninsula' in 2010 (with Anna Trias-Blasi, Eddie, William M.M. and Michel Möller).

He contributed to 'The Davis Festschrift' (edited by Kit Tan) on Peter Hadland Davis's 70th birthday and his own 60th Birthday in 1989.

In 1999, he was honoured by the naming of Ianhedgea, a genus of flowering plants belonging to the family Brassicaceae from central Asia and Tibet.

He is mentioned in Mabberley's Plant-book of 2003 and his The Plant-book: A Portable Dictionary of the Vascular Plants (in 1990).

In 2010, with other members of the Royal Botanical Garden, he identified various plant specimens for Mark Price's book 'Animal Re-introductions: The Arabian Oryx in Oman'.

On 31 January 2012, he appealed (on behalf of the Royal Botanic Garden) via the BBC to the Pakistani government to release more than 4,000 copies of a botany text book destined for Afghanistan schools and environmental groups. The 10 tonnes of books had been held at customs in Karachi for the past year. It is the 'Field Guide Afghanistan Flora and Vegetation', written by Ian and Siegmar-Walter Breckle in 2010.

Hedge died on 7 August 2022, at the age of 93.

== Other sources ==
- M. Alam, 2009, "Plant Collectors in Afghanistan", Bulletin de la Société vaudoise des Sciences naturelles, 91(3): 327-329
- K. Tan (ed.), 1989, Plant taxonomy, phytogeography and related subjects. The Davis & Hedge Festschrift.
- Kent, D.H. & Allen, D.E., Brit. Irish Herb. (1984)

== Bibliography ==
- Studies in the Flora of Afghanistan by Ian Charleson Hedge and Per Wendelbo, 1963
- Flora Iranica: Capparidaceae - Volume 68 (Ian Charleson Hedge - 1970)
- Index of collectors in the Edinburgh Herbarium / edited by I. C. Hedge and J. M. Lamond, Edinburgh Herbarium, 1970
- Plant life of South-West Asia. Edited by Peter Hadland Davis, Peter Charles Harper and Ian Charleson Hedge (1971),
- Flora Europea (Ian Charleson Hedge - 1972)
- A revision of Salvia in Africa and the Canary Islands. (Ian Hedge - 1974)
- Aizoaceae (Ian Charleson Hedge, Jennifer M. Lamond - 1975)
- Molluginaceae (Ian Charleson Hedge, Jennifer M. Lamond - 1975)
- Iridaceae: Aizoaceae (Karl Heinz Rechinger, Per Wendelbo, Brian Mathew, Ian Charleson Hedge, Jennifer M. Lamond, Jindrich Chrtek, Bohdan Křísa, Henriëtte Dorothea Schotsman, Harald Riedl - 1975)
- Flora of Turkey and the East Aegean Islands, vol. 7, Labiatae. (Ian Hedge and P.H Davis) Edinburgh: Edinburgh University Press, 1982
- Flora of Cyprus. Ian C Hedge (R.D. Meikle -editor), Kew Royal Botanic Gardens, 1985
- Umbelliferae / I.C. Hedge editor, Karl Heinz Rechinger Hedge, Ian C. (Ian Charleson) 1987
- Plant Taxonomy, Phytogeography and Related Subjects: Davis and Hedge Festschrift by P. H. Davis, Ian Charleson Hedge, Kit Tan and R.R. Mill (2 Nov 1989)
- Chenopodiaceae (Ian Hedge) 1997
- Labiatae (Ian Charleson Hedge, S. I. Ali, Yasin J. Nasir - 1990 )
- Flora of Pakistan. No. 204, Chenopodiaceae (Heiko Freitag, Ian Charleson Hedge, S. M. H. Jafri) 2001
- Cruciferae (Brassicaceae), Ian Hedge, The Forest Herbarium, Royal Forest Department, 1997.
- Field Guide Afghanistan Flora and Vegetation (Ian Hedge and Siegmar-Walter Breckle, 2010
