= ABRC =

ABRC may refer to:

- Arabidopsis Biological Resource Center, the American collection and distribution organization for the Arabidopsis plant, located at Ohio State University
- Ada Byron Research Center, a research center associated with the Donald Bren School of Information and Computer Sciences, at the University of California, Irvine
