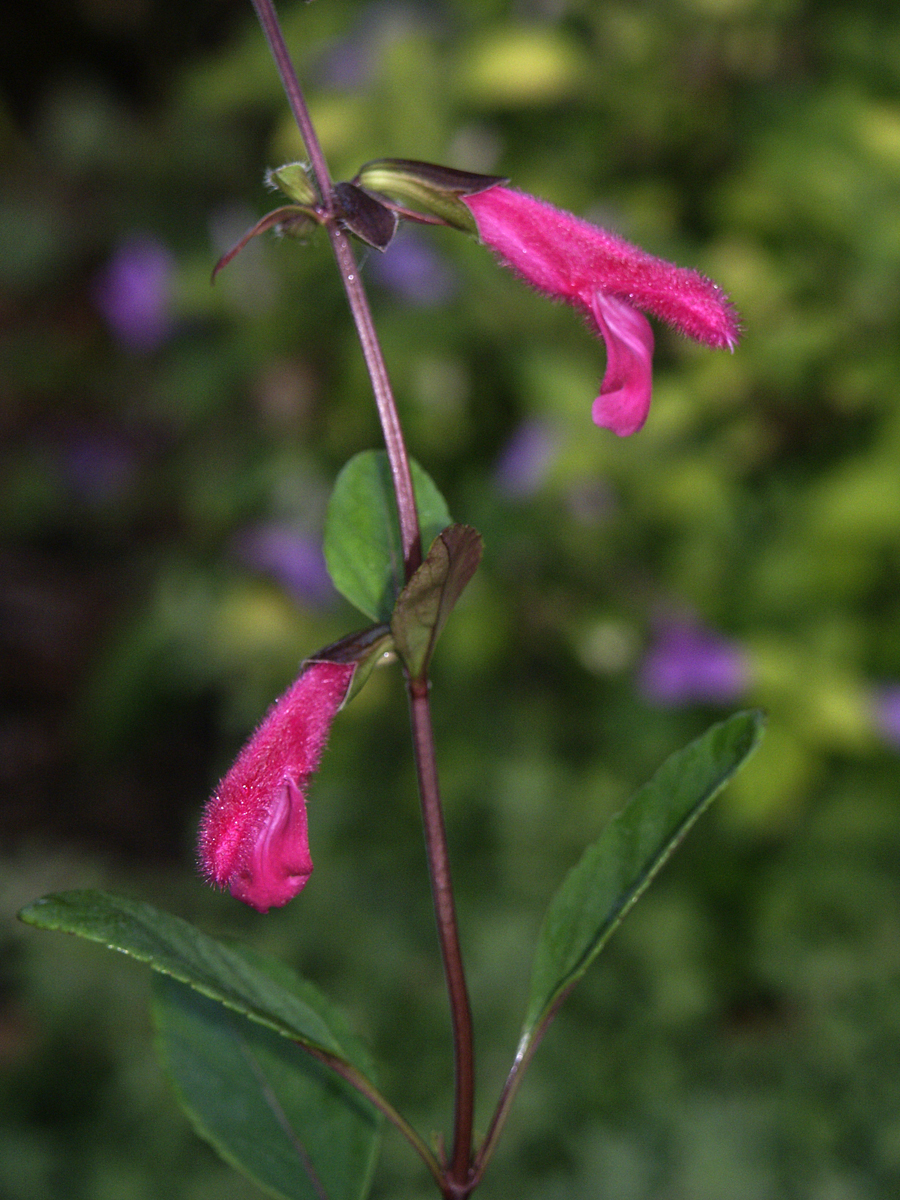

Scientific classification
- Kingdom: Plantae
- Clade: Tracheophytes
- Clade: Angiosperms
- Clade: Eudicots
- Clade: Asterids
- Order: Lamiales
- Family: Lamiaceae
- Genus: Salvia
- Species: S. buchananii

Binomial name
- Salvia buchananii Hedge

= Salvia buchananii =

Species of flowering plant

Salvia buchananii, or Buchanan's sage, is a species of flowering plant in the mint family Lamiaceae. It is a herbaceous perennial or subshrub that was only found in the wild in the northeastern extreme of the state of Querétaro, Mexico, after fifty years of cultivation as a garden plant.

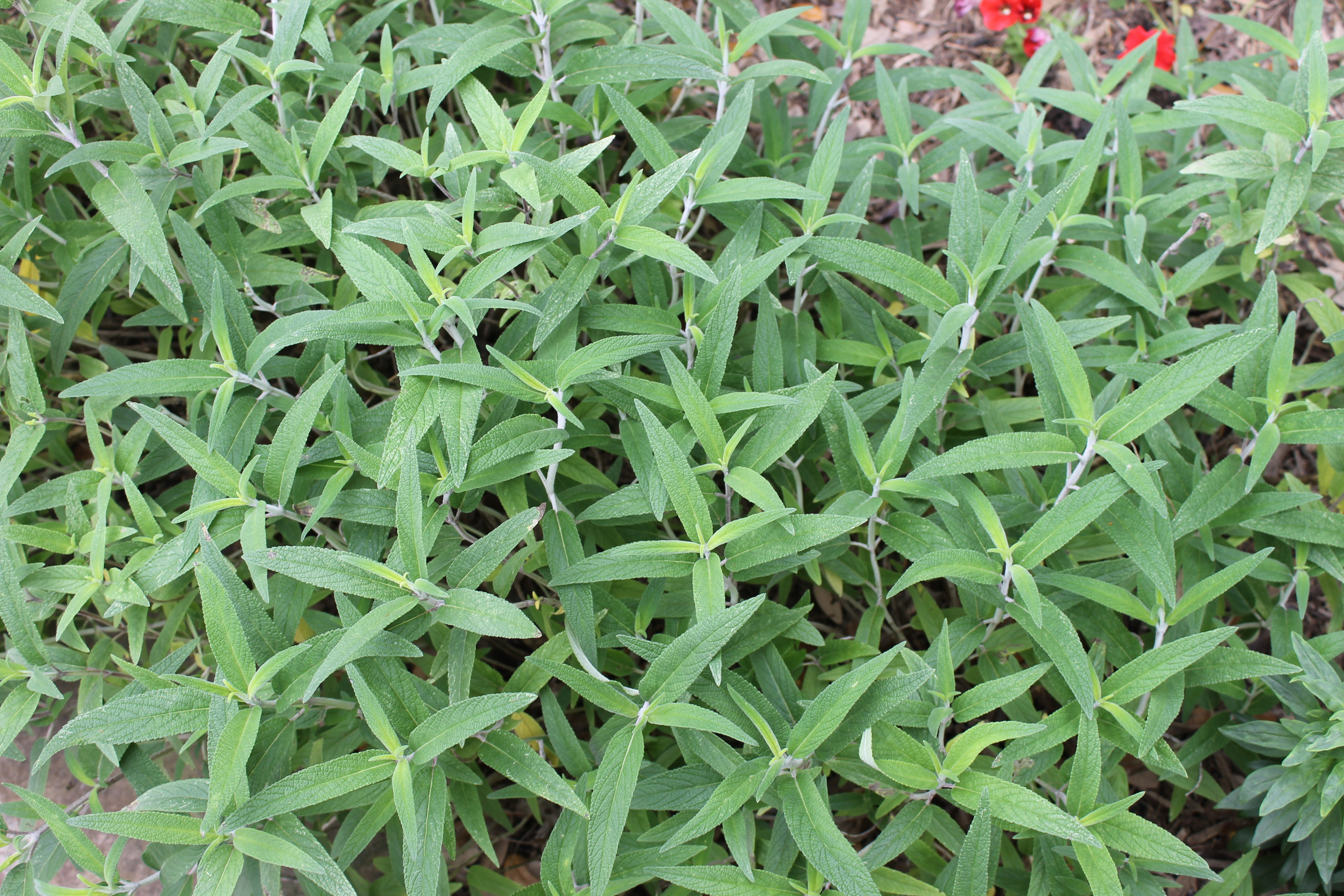
Velvet sage from Mexico at San Antonio Botanical Garden (2015)

== History ==
During the 1950s an unidentified species of Salvia was found in the garden of an English family in Mexico City. A seed from the garden plant was taken to England at around the 1960s, where it was then grown by Sir Charles Buchanan. It is sometimes called Buchanan's fuchsia sage. Ian Charleson Hedge then described Salvia buchananii in the Botanical Magazine in 1963.

== Description ==
Salvia buchananii grows 1–2 feet tall and 1 foot wide, with glossy green leaves widely spaced along the stem. The flowers are a rich magenta, about two inches long, which rarely set seed.

It was found growing in cloud forest, pine-oak forest, and oak thicket in the far northeastern part of the state of Querétaro, Mexico. It is similar to Salvia blepharophylla.

== Award ==
This plant grows well in a temperate climate. However it does not tolerate frost, and requires protection during cold wet winters. It is easy to propagate from cuttings. It has gained the Royal Horticultural Society's Award of Garden Merit.
