= Schrenkiella =

Schrenkiella may refer to:

- Schrenkiella (brachiopod), a genus of brachiopods in the family Monticuliferidae
- Schrenkiella (plant), a genus of plants in the family Brassicaceae
