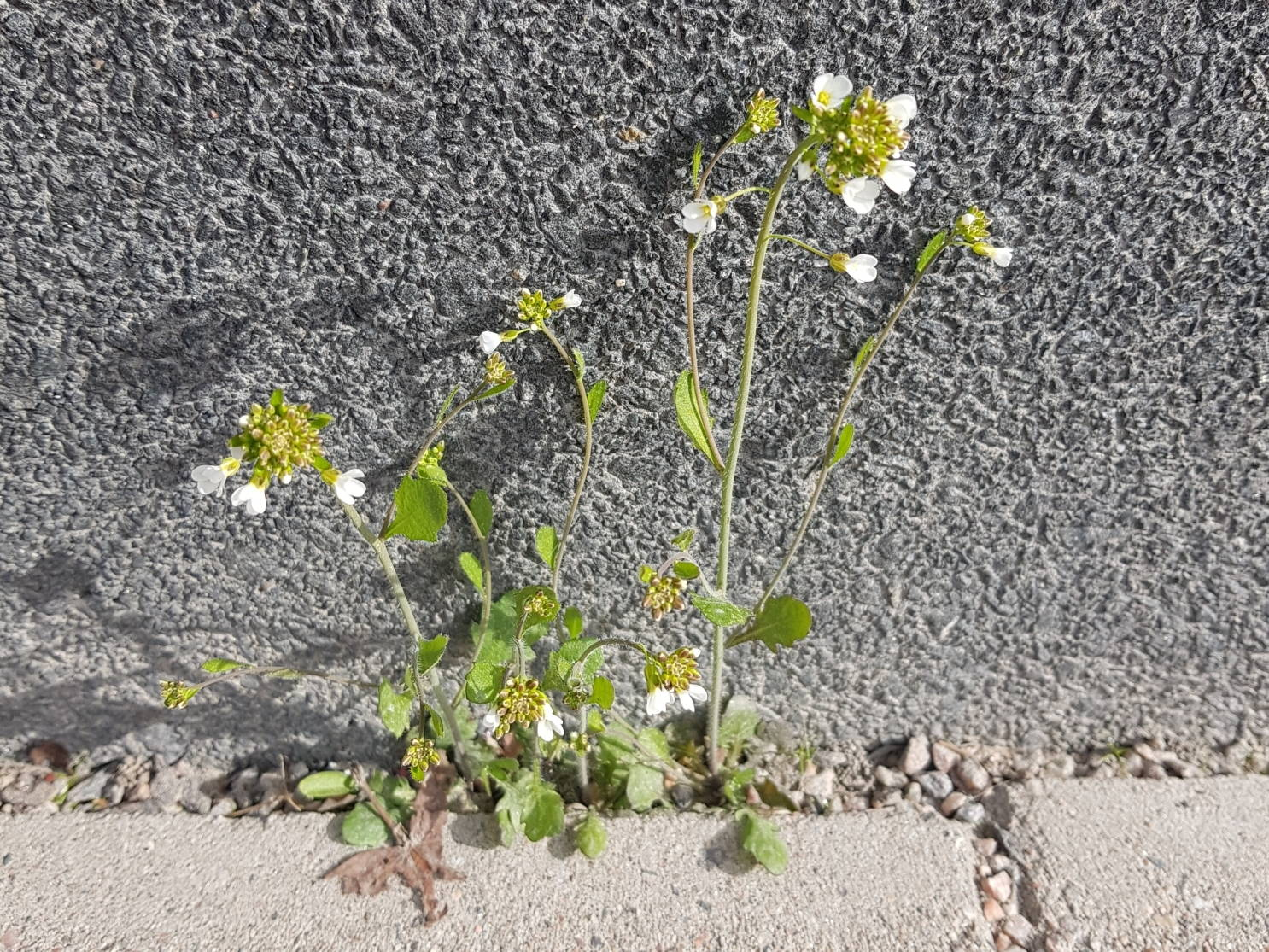

Scientific classification
- Kingdom: Plantae
- Clade: Embryophytes
- Clade: Tracheophytes
- Clade: Angiosperms
- Clade: Eudicots
- Clade: Rosids
- Order: Brassicales
- Family: Brassicaceae
- Genus: Arabidopsis
- Species: A. suecica

Binomial name
- Arabidopsis suecica (Fr.) Norrl.

Synonyms
- Arabis arenosa subsp. suecica (Fr.) Ahlfv.; Arabis arenosa var. suecica (Fr.) Wittr. & Juel; Arabis suecica (Fr.) Norrl.; Arabis thaliana subsp. suecica Fr.; Cardaminopsis suecica (Fr.) Hiitonen ex Hyl.; Hylandra suecica (Fr.) Á.Löve; Sisymbrium suecicum (Fr.) Nyman; Stenophragma suecicum (Fr.) Čelak. ex Prantl

= Arabidopsis suecica =

Species of flowering plant

Arabidopsis suecica, commonly known as Swedish cress or Swedish thale-cress, is a flowering plant in the family Brassicaceae. It is native to Sweden, Finland, and parts of European Russia, and has been introduced into neighboring regions. It is a model organism in allopolyploidy research.

== Description ==
Similar to Arabidopsis thaliana, A. suecica is a small annual plant growing up to 15-40 cm (6-16 in) tall. It is self-compatible. The leaves are lanceolate, elliptic, or narrowly obovate, with toothed margins and stellate trichomes, and arranged in a basal rosette. The inflorescence is a raceme with white flowers 0.5 cm (0.2 in) in diameter.

=== Origin ===
A. suecica is an allotetraploid derived from the hybridization of A. thaliana and Arabidopsis arenosa in Europe approximately 16,000 years ago. Speciation likely involved multiple self-incompatible founding individuals rather than a single hybridization event. A parsimonious explanation for its origin is through the fusion of an unreduced egg cell from diploid A. thaliana with an autotetraploid A. arenosa sperm cell. However, recent evidence suggests that both parents were diploid, and that hybridization was followed by a whole genome duplication event.

== Taxonomy ==
It was originally described by Elias Magnus Fries in 1846 as a subspecies of Arabis thaliana (now Arabidopsis thaliana) and raised to a full species by Johan Petter Norrlin in 1878. In 1961, it was moved to its own genus Hylandra by Áskell Löve. As of March 2024, the move was not accepted by Plants of the World Online, and Hylandra is considered a synonym of Arabidopsis.
