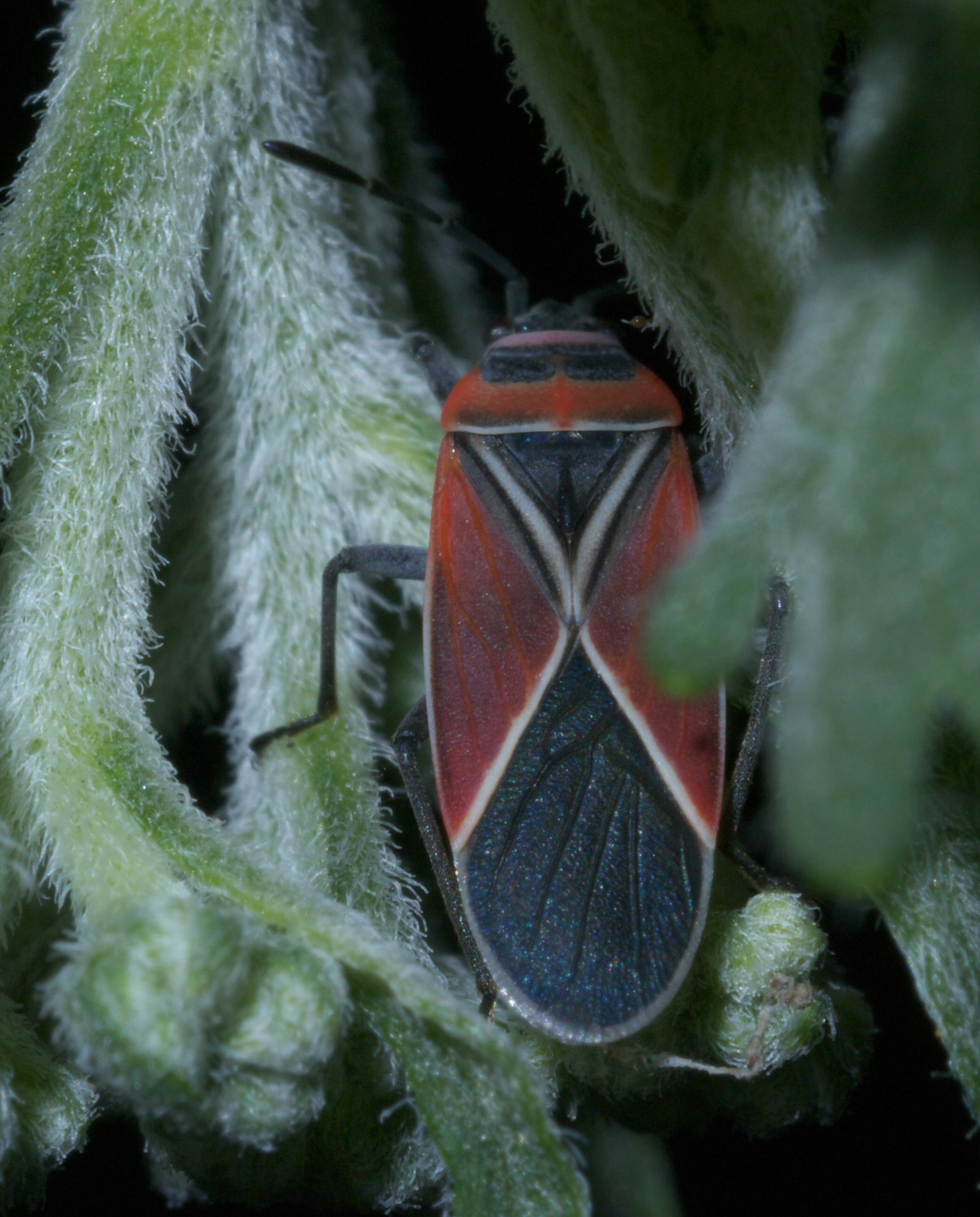
- Neacoryphus bicrucis, whitecrossed seed bug

Scientific classification
- Domain: Eukaryota
- Kingdom: Animalia
- Phylum: Arthropoda
- Class: Insecta
- Order: Hemiptera
- Suborder: Heteroptera
- Family: Lygaeidae
- Subfamily: Lygaeinae
- Genus: Neacoryphus; Scudder, 1965

= Neacoryphus =

Genus of true bugs

Neacoryphus is a genus of seed bugs in the family Lygaeidae. There are about five described species in Neacoryphus.

== Species ==
These species belong to the genus Neacoryphus:

Neacoryphus albonotatus (Barber, 1923)
Neacoryphus bicrucis (Say, 1825) (whitecrossed seed bug)
Neacoryphus circumlinitus (Distant, 1893)
Neacoryphus rubrocephala Brailovsky, 1977
Neacoryphus verecundus (Distant, 1893)
