= Arabidopsis arenicola =

Arctic rock-cress

Conservation status
- Apparently Secure (NatureServe)

Scientific classification
- Kingdom: Plantae
- Clade: Embryophytes
- Clade: Tracheophytes
- Clade: Angiosperms
- Clade: Eudicots
- Clade: Rosids
- Order: Brassicales
- Family: Brassicaceae
- Genus: Arabidopsis
- Species: A. arenicola

Binomial name
- Arabidopsis arenicola (Richardson ex Hook.) Al-Shehbaz, Elven, D.F. Murray & S.I. Warwick

Synonyms
- Arabis arenicola (Richardson ex Hook.) Gelert; Arabis arenicola var. pubescens (S. Watson) Gelert; Arabis humifusa (J. Vahl) S. Watson; Arabis humifusa var. pubescens S. Watson; Cardaminopsis arenicola Á. Löve & D. Löve; Eutrema arenicola Richardson ex Hook.; Parrya arenicola (Richardson ex Hook.) Hook.; Sisymbrium humifusum J. Vahl

Species of flowering plant

Arabidopsis arenicola, the Arctic rock-cress, is a plant species native to the northeastern part of North America. It has been reported from Greenland, Labrador, Nunavut, Northwest Territories, Québec, Ontario, Manitoba, and Saskatchewan. It grows on sandy or gravely beaches or stream banks at elevations below 1,500 metres (4,900 ft).

Arabidopsis arenicola is a perennial herb up to 30 centimetres (12 in) tall, usually hairless or almost hairless. Basal leaves are up to 6 centimetres (2.4 in) long; stem leaves up to 2.5 millimetres (0.098 in) long. Flowers are white, up to 10 millimetres (0.39 in) across. Fruits are straight, smooth, cylindrical or slightly flattened, up to 3 centimetres (1.2 in) long.

A. arenicola is a self-fertilizing lineage that arose from the outcrossing species Arabidopsis lyrata, and is associated with range expansion. During this range expansion there was no significant increase in mutational load due to selfing, probably because of quasi-clonal selection.
