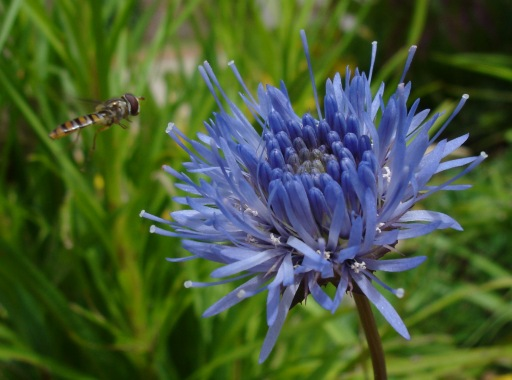

Scientific classification
- Kingdom: Plantae
- Clade: Tracheophytes
- Clade: Angiosperms
- Clade: Eudicots
- Clade: Asterids
- Order: Asterales
- Family: Campanulaceae
- Genus: Jasione
- Species: J. laevis

Binomial name
- Jasione laevis Lam.

Synonyms
- Jasione perennis

= Jasione laevis =

Species of flowering plant

Jasione laevis is an ornamental plant. It was formerly known as Jasione perennis.
