= Jasione foliosa subsp. mansanetiana =

Conservation status
- Endangered (IUCN 3.1)

Scientific classification
- Kingdom: Plantae
- Clade: Tracheophytes
- Clade: Angiosperms
- Clade: Eudicots
- Clade: Asterids
- Order: Asterales
- Family: Campanulaceae
- Genus: Jasione
- Species: J. foliosa
- Subspecies: J. f. subsp. mansanetiana

Trinomial name
- Jasione foliosa subsp. mansanetiana (Roselló & Peris) Rivas Mart. (2002)

Synonyms
- Jasione mansanetiana Roselló & Peris (1992)

Species of flowering plant

Jasione foliosa subsp. mansanetiana is a subspecies of flowering plant in the family Campanulaceae. It is endemic to central Spain. Its natural habitat is rocky areas. It is threatened by habitat loss.
