= Jasione corymbosa =

Scientific classification
- Kingdom: Plantae
- Clade: Tracheophytes
- Clade: Angiosperms
- Clade: Eudicots
- Clade: Asterids
- Order: Asterales
- Family: Campanulaceae
- Genus: Jasione
- Species: J. corymbosa

Binomial name
- Jasione corymbosa Poir. ex Schult. (1819)

Synonyms
- Jasione corymbosa var. battandieri Maire (1937); Jasione corymbosa subsp. glabra (Durieu ex Boiss. & Reut.) Batt. (1889); Jasione corymbosa var. glabra (Durieu ex Boiss. & Reut.) J.Parn. (1987); Jasione glabra Durieu ex Boiss. & Reut. (1852); Jasione montana subsp. glabra (Durieu ex Boiss. & Reut.) Greuter & Burdet (1981), nom. illeg.; Jasione montana var. glabra (Durieu ex Boiss. & Reut.) J.Parn. (1987), nom. illeg.; Jasione montana subsp. corymbosa (Poir. ex Schult.) Greuter & Burdet (1981); Jasione montana var. corymbosa (Poir. ex Schult.) Schmeja (1931)

Species of flowering plant

Jasione corymbosa

Jasione corymbosa is a species of flowering plant in the bellflower family, Campanulaceae. It is an annual native to the western Mediterranean, including the Portugal and Spain on the Iberian Peninsula and Algeria and Morocco in northwest Africa.
