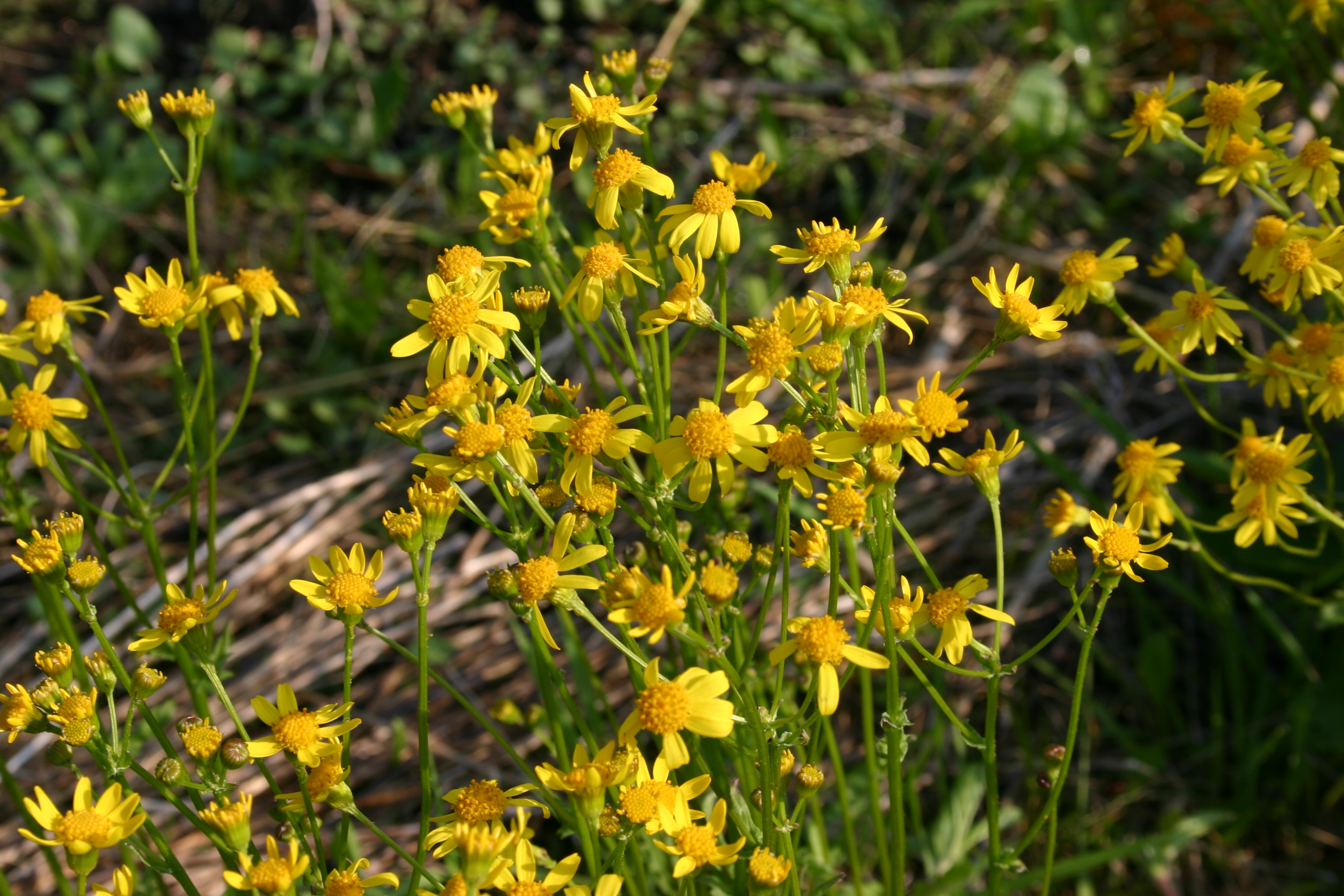

Conservation status
- Secure (NatureServe)

Scientific classification
- Kingdom: Plantae
- Clade: Tracheophytes
- Clade: Angiosperms
- Clade: Eudicots
- Clade: Asterids
- Order: Asterales
- Family: Asteraceae
- Genus: Packera
- Species: P. obovata

Binomial name
- Packera obovata (Muhl. ex Willd.) W.A.Weber & Á.Löve

= Packera obovata =

Roundleaf ragwort

Species of plant

Packera obovata, commonly known as roundleaf ragwort, spoon-leaved ragwort, or roundleaf groundsel is an erect perennial herb in the Asteraceae (aster) family native to eastern North America. It was previously called Senecio obovatus. Basal and lower leaves are obovate with toothed margins, while upper leaves are pinnately divided. The ray flowers are yellow and the disk flowers orange-yellow, the inflorescences being held well above the foliage.

== Description ==
Packera obovata is an erect perennial herb growing to a height of up to 2 ft (60 cm). It has fibrous roots and a basal rosette of leaves up to 1 ft (30 cm) across. The basal leaves are mid-green and hairless, circular, oval or obovate in shape and have crinkly toothed margins. The leaf stalks are about the same length as the leaf blades, green or purplish in colour and usually hairless; some have slight winging and may be cobwebby-pubescent. The flower stalk may also be cobwebby at the base, and bears two or three alternate pinnatifid leaves with irregular lobes. It is topped by a flat-headed panicle, each individual flower-head being up to 0.75 in (2 cm) in diameter. The flower-head has a single row of linear-lanceolate green bracts, eight to sixteen yellow ray-florets and a central mound of orange-yellow disc florets. Both ray and disk florets are followed by brown achenes set in tufts of white hair. The achenes are dispersed by the wind, and the plant can also spread by vegetative growth from stolons or rhizomes.

== Distribution and habitat ==
The native range of P. obovata is northern Mexico, the eastern United States and south-eastern Canada, extending from Coahuila to Quebec and Ontario. It is most common in the southern half of the range. Typical habitats include moist but well-drained calcareous soils, wooded slopes, and rocky areas in shaded or semi-shaded locations.

== Ecology ==
Flowers of P. obovata bloom in the early spring and are visited by cuckoo bees, halictid bees, andrenid bees, hoverflies, tachinid flies and various species of beetle. The larvae of the northern metalmark butterfly (Calephelis borealis) feed on the leaves of the plant, and the white-crossed seed bug (Neacoryphus bicrucis) feeds on the seeds. Like many species of ragwort, the plant is toxic to many herbivorous mammals, but sheep seem more tolerant of it than are most other grazing animals.

P. obovata forms colonies by spreading through rhizomes. Dense colonies can form in wet, sunny areas, while the colony will be sparser with shorter plants in drier, shadier spots.
