= Eutrema salsugineum =

Conservation status
- Secure (NatureServe)

Scientific classification
- Kingdom: Plantae
- Clade: Tracheophytes
- Clade: Angiosperms
- Clade: Eudicots
- Clade: Rosids
- Order: Brassicales
- Family: Brassicaceae
- Genus: Eutrema
- Species: E. salsugineum

Binomial name
- Eutrema salsugineum (Pall.) Al-Shehbaz & Warwick

Synonyms
- List: Arabidopsis glauca (Nutt.) Rydb.; Arabidopsis salsuginea (Pall.) N.Busch; Hesperis glauca Kuntze; Hesperis salsuginea (Pall.) Kuntze; Pilosella glauca (Nutt.) Rydb.; Sisymbrium glaucum Nutt.; Sisymbrium salsugineum Pall.; Sisymbrium salsuginosum Willd.; Sisymbrium salsum Georgi; Stenophragma salsugineum Prantl; Thellungiella salsuginea (Pall.) O.E.Schulz; Thellungiella salsuginea f. robusta S.L.Welsh; Thelypodium salsugineum (Pall.) B.L.Rob.; Turritis diffusa Hook.; Turritis salsuginosa (Pall.) DC.; Turritis sanguinea Claus

Species of plant

Eutrema salsugineum (syn. Thellungiella salsuginea), the saltwater cress or salt-lick mustard, is a species of flowering plant in the family Brassicaceae. A petite annual or biennial, it is native to Central Asia, Siberia, Mongolia, northern and eastern China, northwestern and western Canada, Montana and Colorado in the United States, and Nuevo León in Mexico. An extremophile halophyte, it is a close relative of the model organism Arabidopsis thaliana and has been adopted to study salt, drought, and cold stress resistance in plants, including having its genome sequenced.
