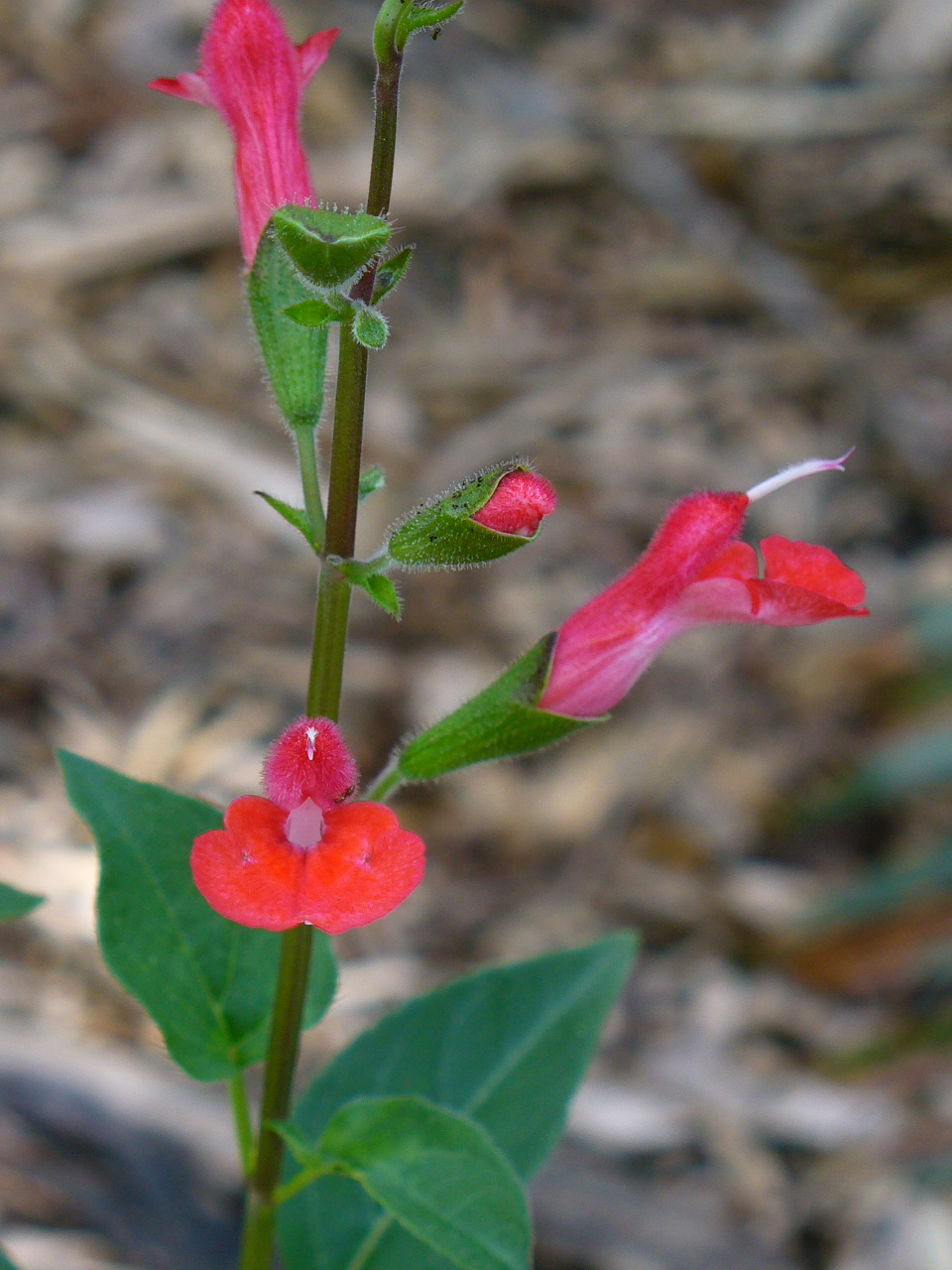

Scientific classification
- Kingdom: Plantae
- Clade: Tracheophytes
- Clade: Angiosperms
- Clade: Eudicots
- Clade: Asterids
- Order: Lamiales
- Family: Lamiaceae
- Genus: Salvia
- Species: S. blepharophylla

Binomial name
- Salvia blepharophylla Brandegee

= Salvia blepharophylla =

Species of flowering plant

Salvia blepharophylla (eyelash-leaved sage) is a creeping perennial from the Mexican states of San Luis Potosí and Tamaulipas. The epithet, blepharophylla, is from the Greek for "with leaves fringed like eyelashes".

It is a rapidly spreading stoloniferous plant with 2.5 cm (0.98 in) long signal-red flowers with an orange undertone. The flowers grow in loose whorls spaced about 2.5 cm (0.98 in) apart, on 30 cm (12 in) long inflorescences. In full bloom the plant reaches 45 cm (18 in) in height.
