= Ianhedgea =

Scientific classification
- Kingdom: Plantae
- Clade: Tracheophytes
- Clade: Angiosperms
- Clade: Eudicots
- Clade: Rosids
- Order: Brassicales
- Family: Brassicaceae
- Genus: Ianhedgea; Al-Shehbaz & O'Kane
- Species: I. minutiflora

Binomial name
- Ianhedgea minutiflora (Hook.f. & Thomson) Al-Shehbaz & O'Kane

Synonyms
- Guillenia minutiflorum (Hook.f. & Thomson) Bennet; Hesperis minutiflora (Hook.f. & Thomson) Kuntze; Microsisymbrium minutiflorum (Hook.f. & Thomson) O.E.Schulz; Sisymbrium minutiflorum Hook.f. & Thomson

Genus of flowering plants

Ianhedgea is a monotypic genus of flowering plants belonging to the family Brassicaceae. The only species is Ianhedgea minutiflora.

Its native range is from Iran to Central Asia and Tibet. It is found in the countries of Afghanistan, Iran, Kyrgyzstan, Pakistan, Tajikistan, Tibet, Turkmenistan and Uzbekistan.

The genus name of Ianhedgea is in honour of Ian Charleson Hedge (b. 1928), a Scottish botanist at the Royal Botanic Gardens in Edinburgh. The Latin specific epithet of minutiflora means 'minute' meaning small and 'flora' meaning flower.

Both genus, species and subspecies were first described and published in Edinburgh J. Bot. Vol.56 on page 322 in 1999.

It has a subspecies Ianhedgea minutiflora subsp. brevipedicellata (Hedge) Al-Shehbaz & O'Kane (syn. Microsisymbrium murgabicum Ikonn.) from Afghanistan and Tajikistan.
