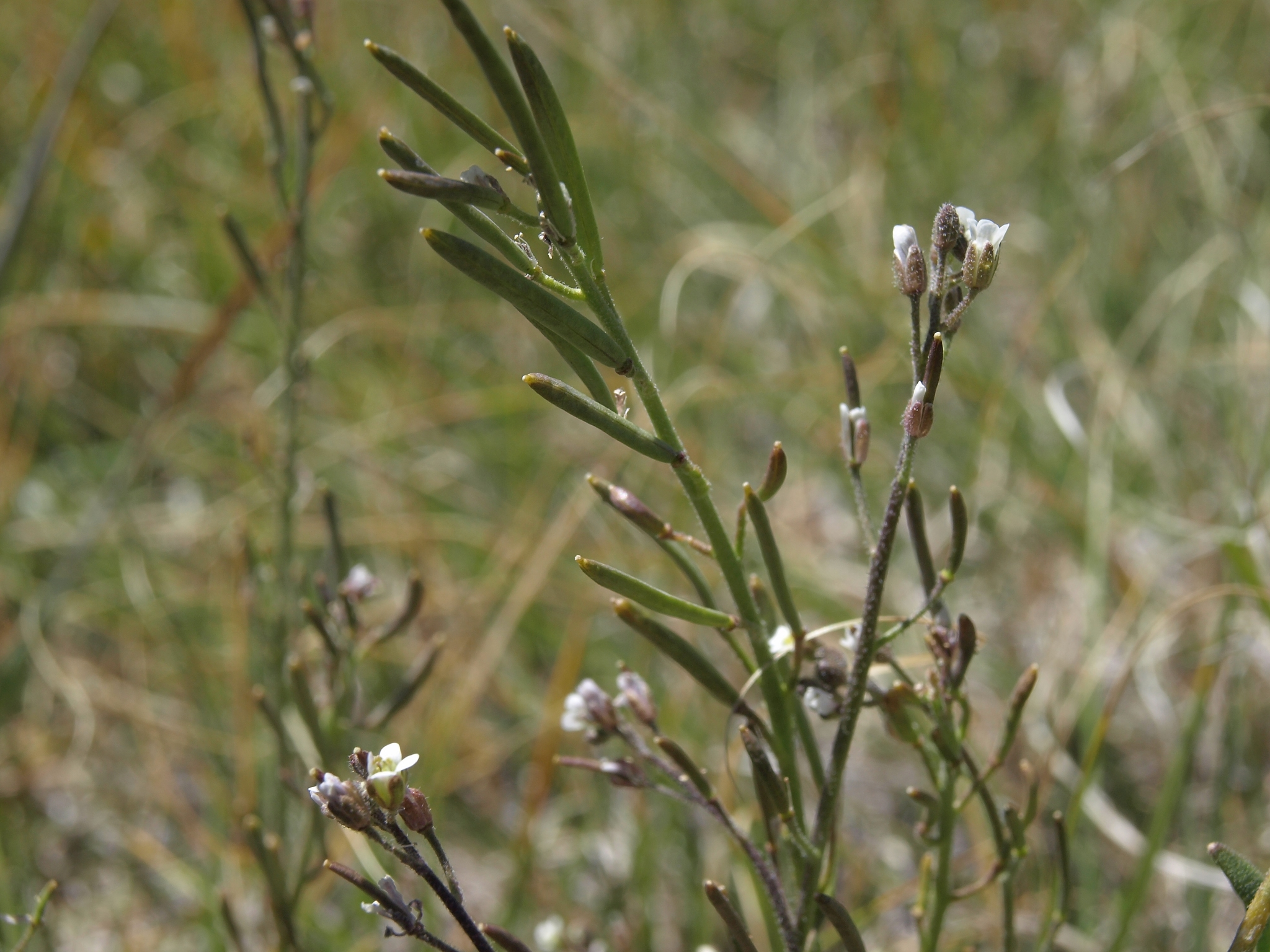
- Crucihimalaya virgata

Scientific classification
- Kingdom: Plantae
- Clade: Tracheophytes
- Clade: Angiosperms
- Clade: Eudicots
- Clade: Rosids
- Order: Brassicales
- Family: Brassicaceae
- Genus: Crucihimalaya; Al-Shehbaz, O'Kane & R.A.Price

Synonyms
- Beringia R.A.Price, Al-Shehbaz & O'Kane; Transberingia Al-Shehbaz & O'Kane

= Crucihimalaya =

Genus of flowering plants

Crucihimalaya is a genus of flowering plants belonging to the family Brassicaceae. Its native range is Sinai to China, and western and subarctic North America.

== Species ==
13 species are accepted.

- Crucihimalaya axillaris (Hook.f. & Thomson) Al-Shehbaz, O'Kane & R.A.Price
- Crucihimalaya bursifolia (DC.) D.A.German & A.L.Ebel
- Crucihimalaya himalaica (Edgew.) Al-Shehbaz, O'Kane & R.A.Price
- Crucihimalaya kneuckeri (Bornm.) Al-Shehbaz, O'Kane & R.A.Price
- Crucihimalaya lasiocarpa (Hook.f. & Thomson) Al-Shehbaz, O'Kane & R.A.Price
- Crucihimalaya mollissima (C.A.Mey.) Al-Shehbaz, O'Kane & R.A.Price
- Crucihimalaya ovczinnikovii (Botsch.) Al-Shehbaz, O'Kane & R.A.Price
- Crucihimalaya rupicola (Krylov) A.L.Ebel & D.A.German
- Crucihimalaya stricta (Cambess.) Al-Shehbaz, O'Kane & R.A.Price
- Crucihimalaya tenuisiliqua (Rech.f. & Köie) Al-Shehbaz, D.A.German & M.Koch
- Crucihimalaya tibetica (Hook.f. & Thomson) Al-Shehbaz, D.A.German & M.Koch
- Crucihimalaya virgata (Nutt.) D.A.German & A.L.Ebel
- Crucihimalaya wallichii (Hook.f. & Thomson) Al-Shehbaz, O'Kane & R.A.Price
