= Robeschia =

Scientific classification
- Kingdom: Plantae
- Clade: Tracheophytes
- Clade: Angiosperms
- Clade: Eudicots
- Clade: Rosids
- Order: Brassicales
- Family: Brassicaceae
- Genus: Robeschia; Hochst. ex O.E.Schulz
- Species: R. schimperi

Binomial name
- Robeschia schimperi (Boiss.) O.E.Schulz

Synonyms
- Arabidopsis schimperi (Boiss.) N.Busch; Sisymbrium schimperi Boiss. (1842) (basionym); Sisymbrium sophia var. schimperi (Boiss.) Hook.f. & Thomson

Genus of plants

Robeschia is a genus of flowering plants belonging to the family Brassicaceae. It includes a single species, Robeschia schimperi, an annual native to the Eastern Mediterranean (Syria to Sinai) and to Iran, Afghanistan, and Pakistan, where it grows in deserts and dry shrublands.
