= Calmodulin-binding transcription activator 1 =

Gene of the species Homo sapiens

CAMTA1
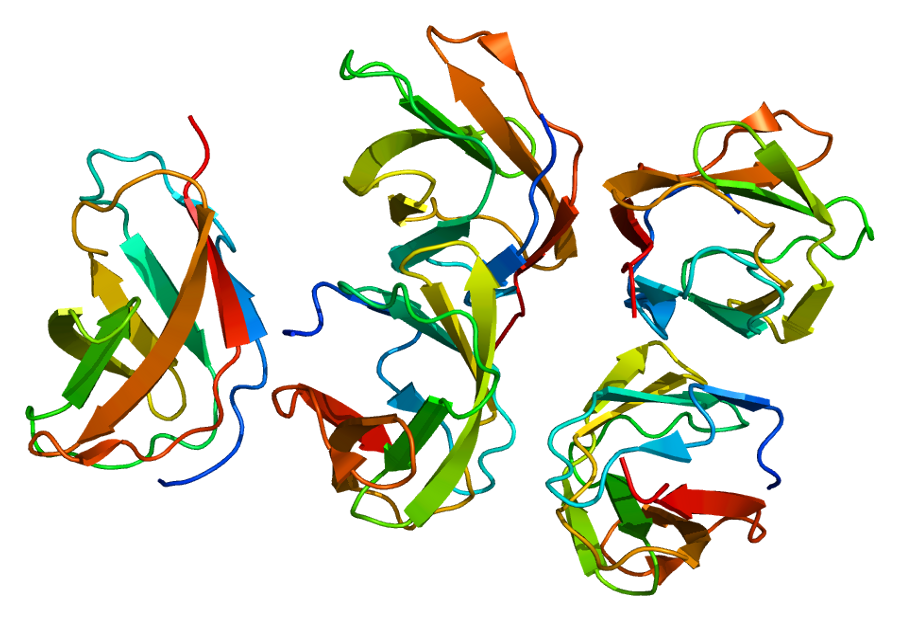

Identifiers
- Aliases: CAMTA1, CANPMR, calmodulin binding transcription activator 1
- External IDs: OMIM: 611501; MGI: 2140230; GeneCards: CAMTA1
Available structures
PDB	Ortholog search: PDBe RCSB
PDB	List of PDB id codes 2CXK

Gene location (Mouse)
Chr.	Chromosome 4 (mouse)
Band	4|4 E2	Start	150,917,322 bp
Band	4|4 E2	End	151,861,876 bp
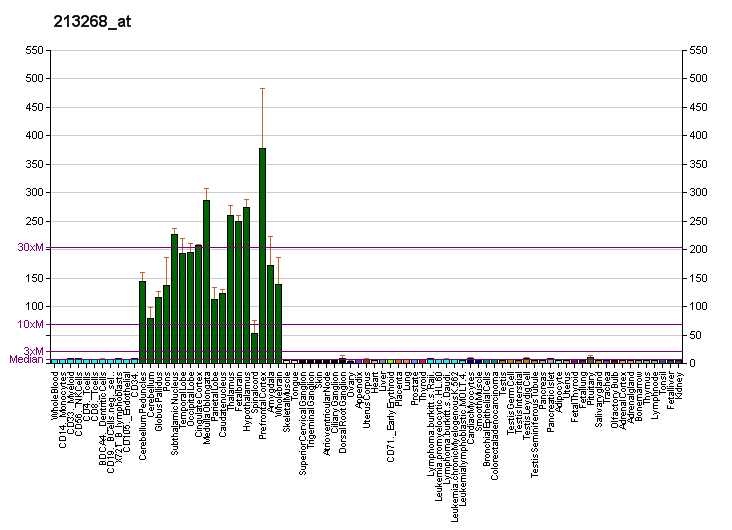
RNA expression pattern
Bgee	Human / Mouse (ortholog); n/a / Top expressed in: ventromedial nucleus; superior colliculus; inferior colliculi; mammillary body; lateral septal nucleus; lateral hypothalamus; central gray substance of midbrain; dorsomedial hypothalamic nucleus; paraventricular nucleus of hypothalamus; cerebellar cortex
BioGPS	More reference expression data
Gene ontology
Molecular function	sequence-specific DNA binding; DNA binding; DNA-binding transcription activator activity, RNA polymerase II-specific; DNA-binding transcription factor activity, RNA polymerase II-specific
Cellular component	nucleus; nucleolus; cytoplasm; cytosol
Biological process	regulation of transcription, DNA-templated; neuromuscular process controlling balance; transcription, DNA-templated; positive regulation of transcription by RNA polymerase II; transcription by RNA polymerase II; positive regulation of protein dephosphorylation; positive regulation of calcineurin-NFAT signaling cascade
Sources:Amigo / QuickGO
Orthologs
Databases	NCBI: entry; OMA: entry
Species	Human	Mouse
Entrez	23261	100072
Ensembl	ENSG00000171735	ENSMUSG00000014592
UniProt	Q9Y6Y1	A2A891
RefSeq (mRNA)	NM_001195563; NM_001242701; NM_015215	NM_001081557; NM_001166021; NM_001195565
RefSeq (protein)	NP_001182492; NP_001229630; NP_056030; NP_001336537; NP_001336538 NP_001336539; NP_001336541; NP_001336542; NP_001336543; NP_001336544; NP_001336545; NP_001336546; NP_001336547; NP_001336548; NP_001336549; NP_001336550; NP_001336551; NP_001336552; NP_001336553; NP_001336554; NP_001336555; NP_001336556	NP_001075026; NP_001182494
Location (UCSC)	n/a	Chr 4: 150.92 – 151.86 Mb
PubMed search
- Wikidata
View/Edit Human	View/Edit Mouse

Calmodulin-binding transcription activator 1 is a protein that in humans is encoded by the CAMTA1 gene.
