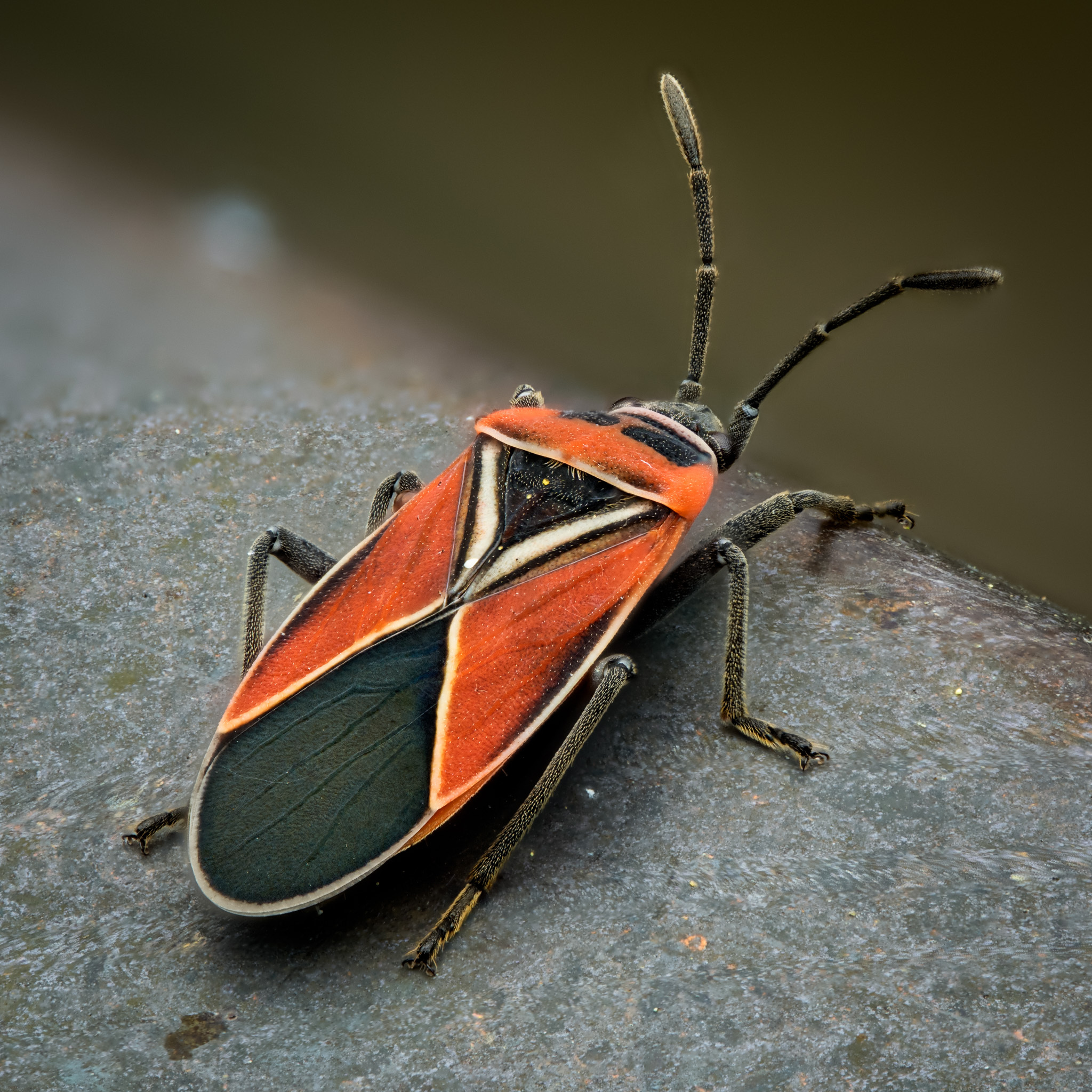

Scientific classification
- Kingdom: Animalia
- Phylum: Arthropoda
- Clade: Pancrustacea
- Class: Insecta
- Order: Hemiptera
- Suborder: Heteroptera
- Family: Lygaeidae
- Genus: Neacoryphus
- Species: N. bicrucis

Binomial name
- Neacoryphus bicrucis (Say, 1825)

Synonyms
- Lygaeus bicrucis Say, 1825

= Neacoryphus bicrucis =

Species of true bug

The whitecrossed seed bug (Neacoryphus bicrucis) or ragwort seed bug is a species of insect in the family Lygaeidae ("seed bugs"), in the order Hemiptera ("true bugs, cicadas, hoppers, aphids and allies").

== Distribution ==
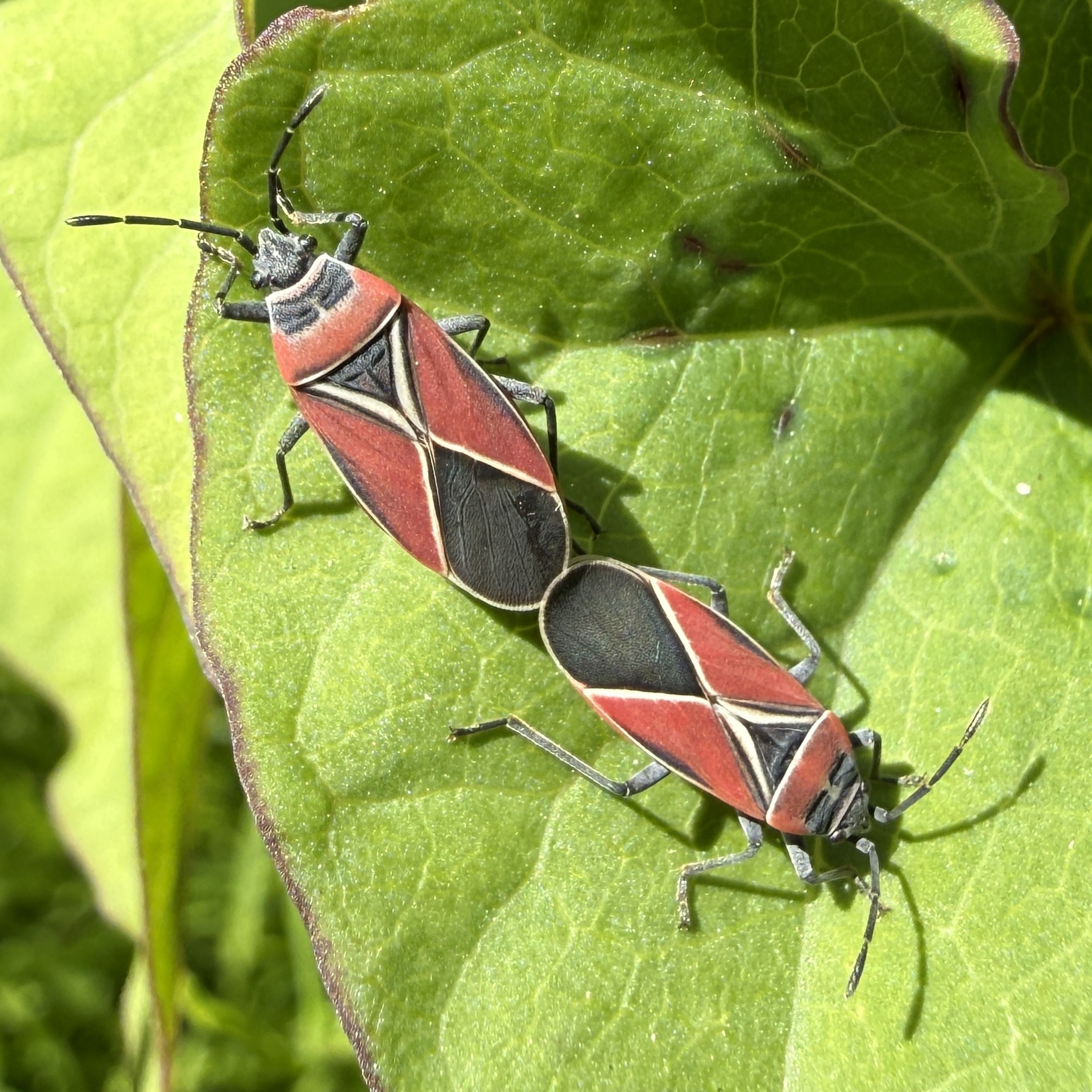
Mating, in British Columbia (Canada)

The distribution range of Neacoryphus bicrucis includes Central America, North America, Oceania, and South America.
