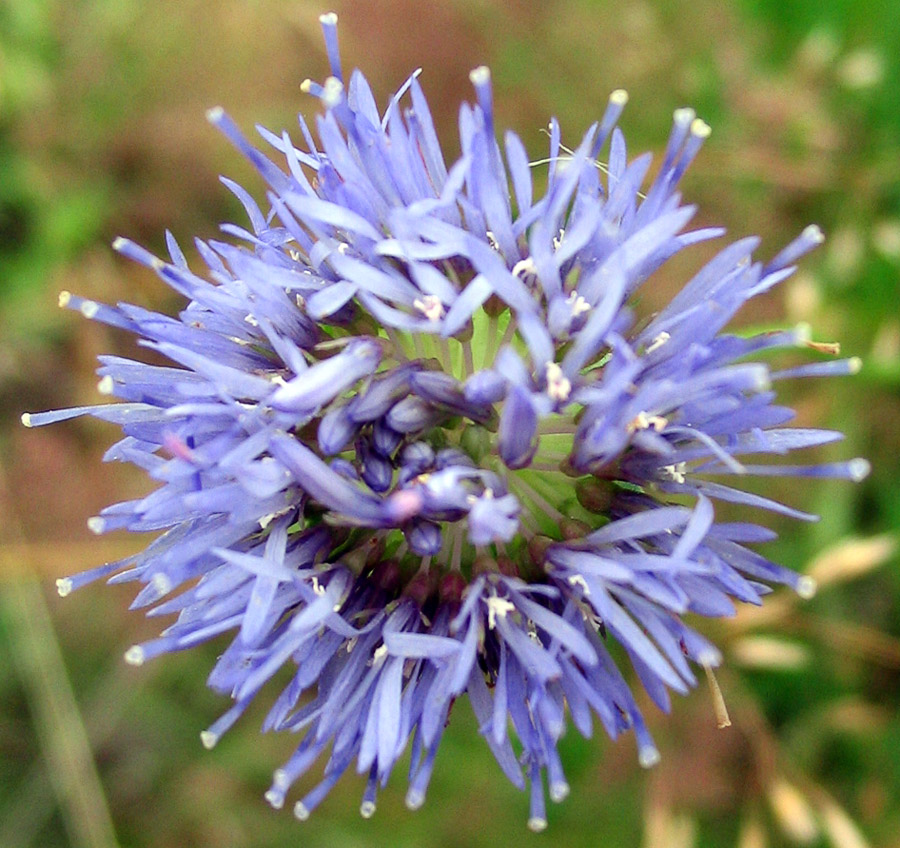
- Jasione montana

Scientific classification
- Kingdom: Plantae
- Clade: Tracheophytes
- Clade: Angiosperms
- Clade: Eudicots
- Clade: Asterids
- Order: Asterales
- Family: Campanulaceae
- Subfamily: Campanuloideae
- Genus: Jasione; L. (1753)

Species
- 14; see text

Synonyms
- Jasionella Stoj. & Stef. (1933); Ovilla Adans. (1763); Urumovia Stef. (1936)

= Jasione =

Genus of flowering plants

Jasione is a genus of flowering plants within the family Campanulaceae. It includes 14 species native to Europe, Turkey, and northwestern Africa.

== Species ==
14 species are accepted.

- Jasione bulgarica Stoj. & Stef.
- Jasione cavanillesii C.Vicioso
- Jasione corymbosa Poir. ex Schult.
- Jasione crispa (Pourr.) Samp.
- Jasione foliosa Cav.
  - Jasione foliosa subsp. foliosa
  - Jasione foliosa subsp. mansanetiana (Roselló & Peris) Rivas Mart. (synonym Jasione mansanetiana Roselló & Peris)
- Jasione heldreichii Boiss. & Orph.
- Jasione idaea Stoj.
- Jasione laevis Lam.
- Jasione maritima (Duby) L.M.Dufour ex Merino
- Jasione montana L.
- Jasione orbiculata Griseb. ex Velen.
- Jasione penicillata Boiss.
- Jasione sphaerocephala Brullo, Marcenò & Pavone
- Jasione supina Sieber ex Spreng.
