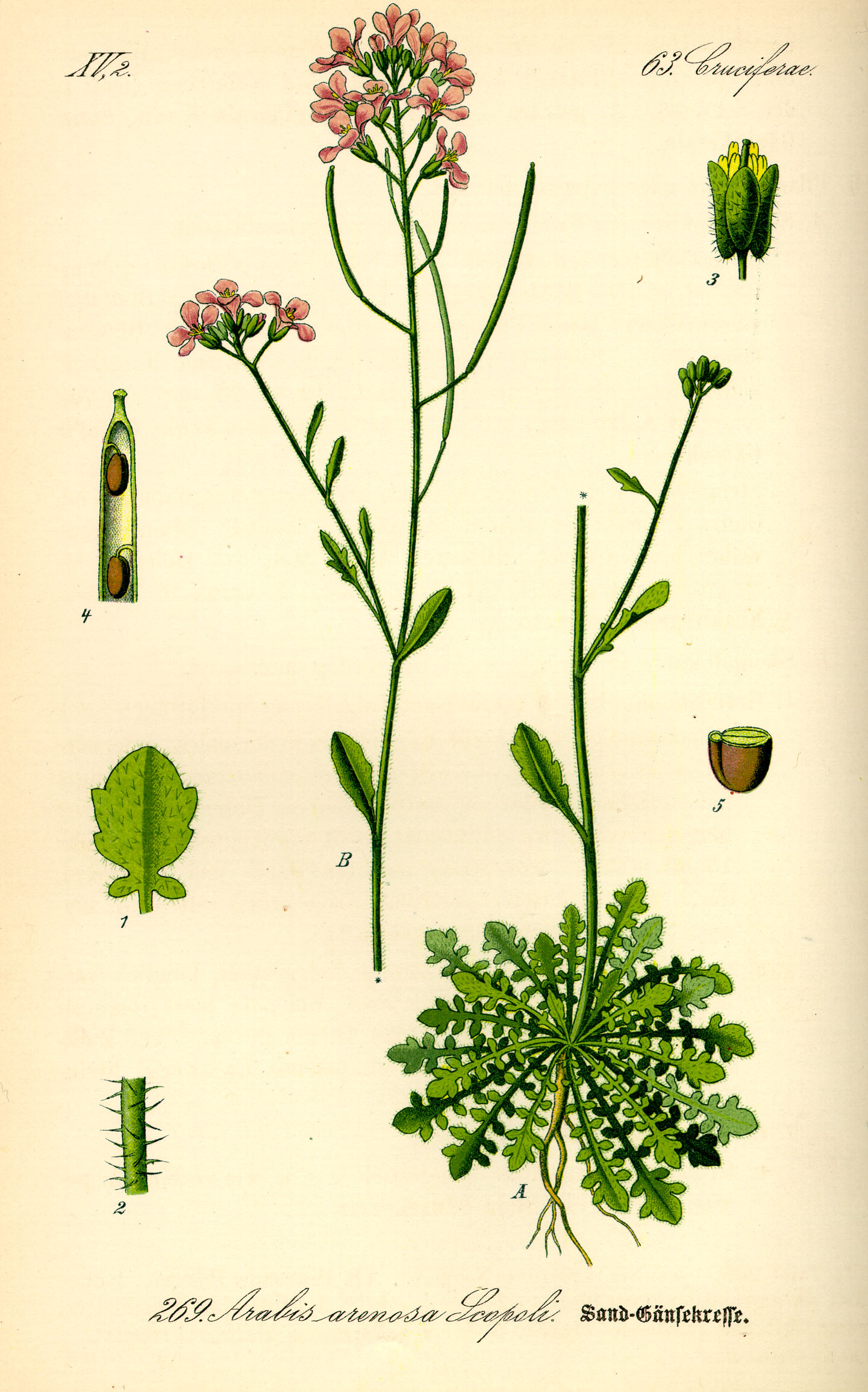

Scientific classification
- Kingdom: Plantae
- Clade: Tracheophytes
- Clade: Angiosperms
- Clade: Eudicots
- Clade: Rosids
- Order: Brassicales
- Family: Brassicaceae
- Genus: Arabidopsis
- Species: A. arenosa

Binomial name
- Arabidopsis arenosa (L.) Lawalrée

Synonyms
- Cardaminopsis arenosa (L.) Hayek

= Arabidopsis arenosa =

Species of flowering plant

Arabidopsis arenosa, the sand rock-cress, is a species of flowering plant in the family Brassicaceae. It is found mostly in Central Europe in both a diploid and an autotetraploid form. This sets it apart from the other, mostly diploid, Arabidopsis species including the closely related Arabidopsis lyrata or Arabidopsis thaliana, the model plant species.

== Bibliography ==
- Joly, Simon; Schmickl, Roswitha; Paule, Juraj; Klein, Johannes; Marhold, Karol; Koch, Marcus A. (2012). "The Evolutionary History of the Arabidopsis arenosa Complex: Diverse Tetraploids Mask the Western Carpathian Center of Species and Genetic Diversity". PLoS ONE. 7 (8) e42691. Bibcode:2012PLoSO...742691S. doi:10.1371/journal.pone.0042691. ISSN 1932-6203. PMC 3411824. PMID 22880083.
