= Olimarabidopsis =

Scientific classification
- Kingdom: Plantae
- Clade: Tracheophytes
- Clade: Angiosperms
- Clade: Eudicots
- Clade: Rosids
- Order: Brassicales
- Family: Brassicaceae
- Genus: Olimarabidopsis; Al-Shehbaz, O'Kane & R.A.Price

Genus of plants

Olimarabidopsis is a genus of flowering plants belonging to the family Brassicaceae.

Its native range is Crimea to Mongolia and Western Himalaya.

== Species ==
Species:

- Olimarabidopsis cabulica (Hook.f. & Thomson) Al-Shehbaz, O'Kane & R.A.Price
- Olimarabidopsis pumila (Stephan ex Willd.) Al-Shehbaz, O'Kane & R.A.Price
- Olimarabidopsis umbrosa (Botsch. & Vved.) Al-Shehbaz, O'Kane & R.A.Price
