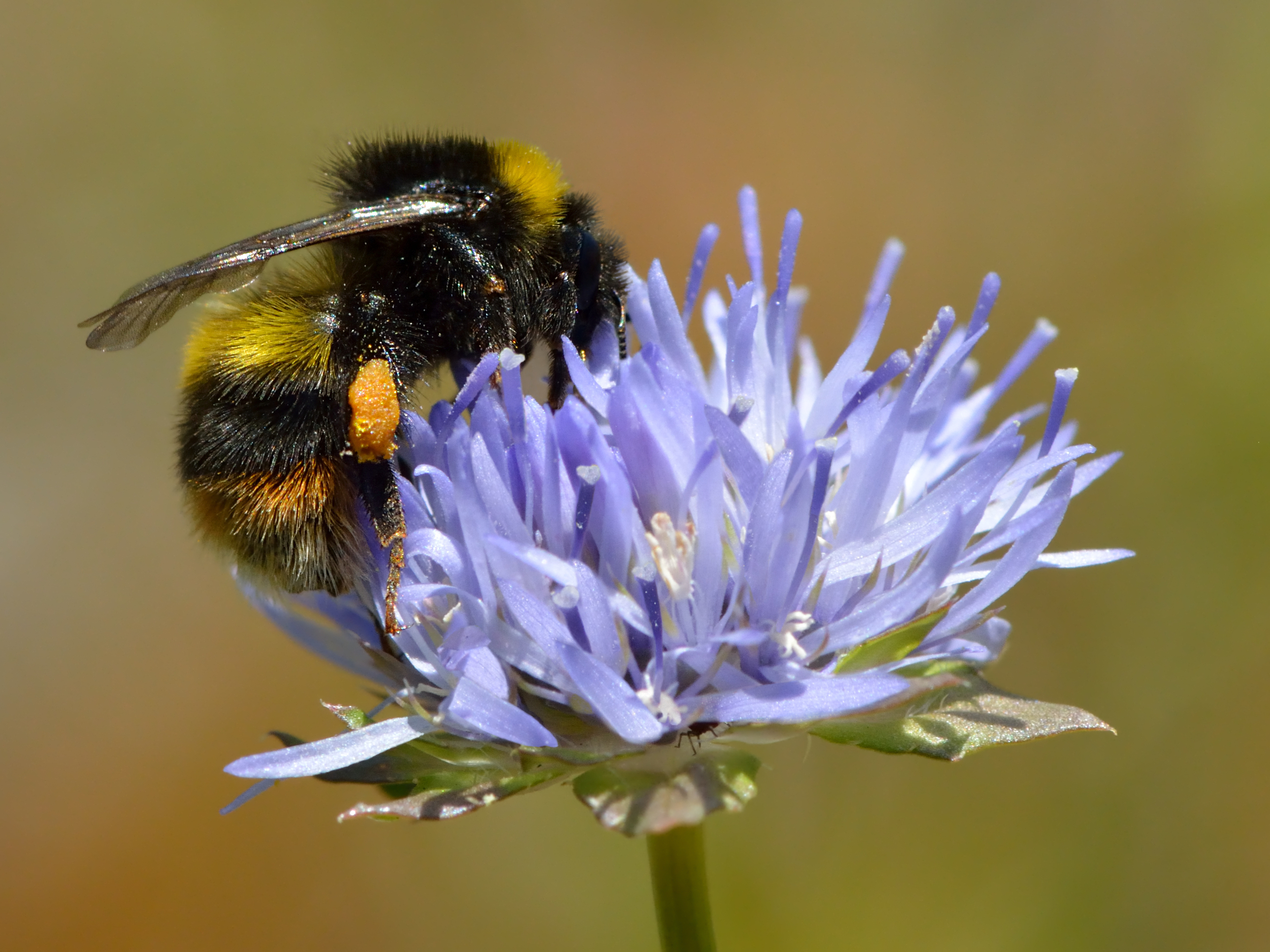
- Bombus soroeensis on sheep's-bit

Scientific classification
- Kingdom: Plantae
- Clade: Tracheophytes
- Clade: Angiosperms
- Clade: Eudicots
- Clade: Asterids
- Order: Asterales
- Family: Campanulaceae
- Genus: Jasione
- Species: J. montana

Binomial name
- Jasione montana L.

Synonyms
- Jasione vulgaris Gaterau (1789), nom. superfl.; Ovilla globulariiflora Rupr. (1860), nom. superfl.; Phyteuma montanum (L.) C.K.Spreng. (1793)

= Jasione montana =

Sheep's bit

Species of flowering plant

Jasione montana is a low-growing plant in the family Campanulaceae found in rocky places and upland regions of Europe and western Asia. Common names include sheep's-bit, blue bonnets, blue buttons, blue daisy and iron flower. Due to the similarity of the common name of "sheep's-bit" with that of devil's-bit scabious (Succisa pratensis), it is sometimes called "sheep's-bit scabious" or "sheep scabious", but it is not closely related to the scabious genus (Scabiosa).

== Distribution and habitat ==
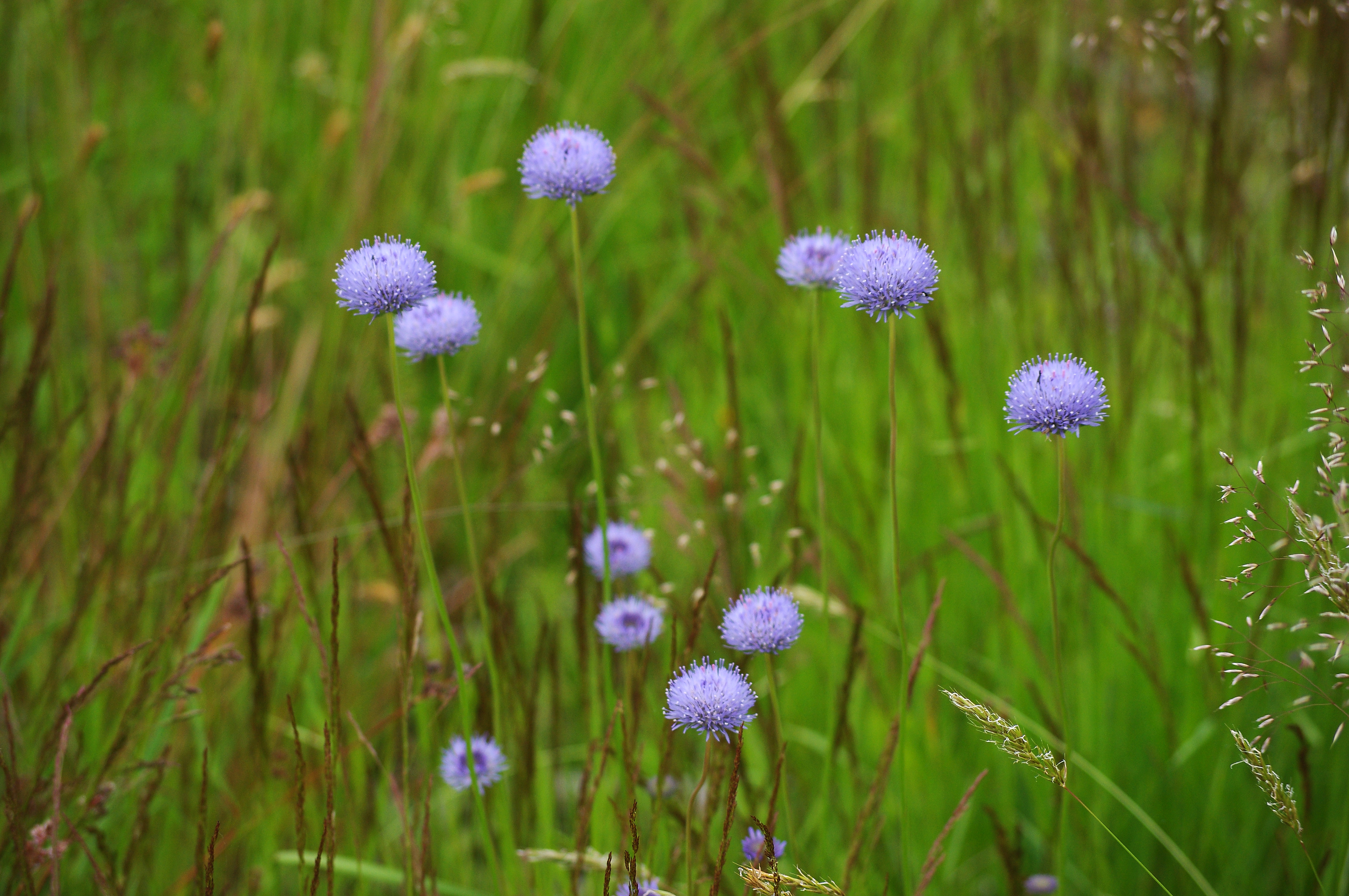

This plant is found in the temperate zone of Europe and northwestern Africa. It is a plant growing on heaths and moors in rocky or sandy districts, coastal cliffs, quarries and natural escarpments where the soil is thin. It prefers acid soils and is absent from limestone regions. It is often found on coastal cliffs in association with thrift and kidney vetch and blooms from May to September.

== Description ==
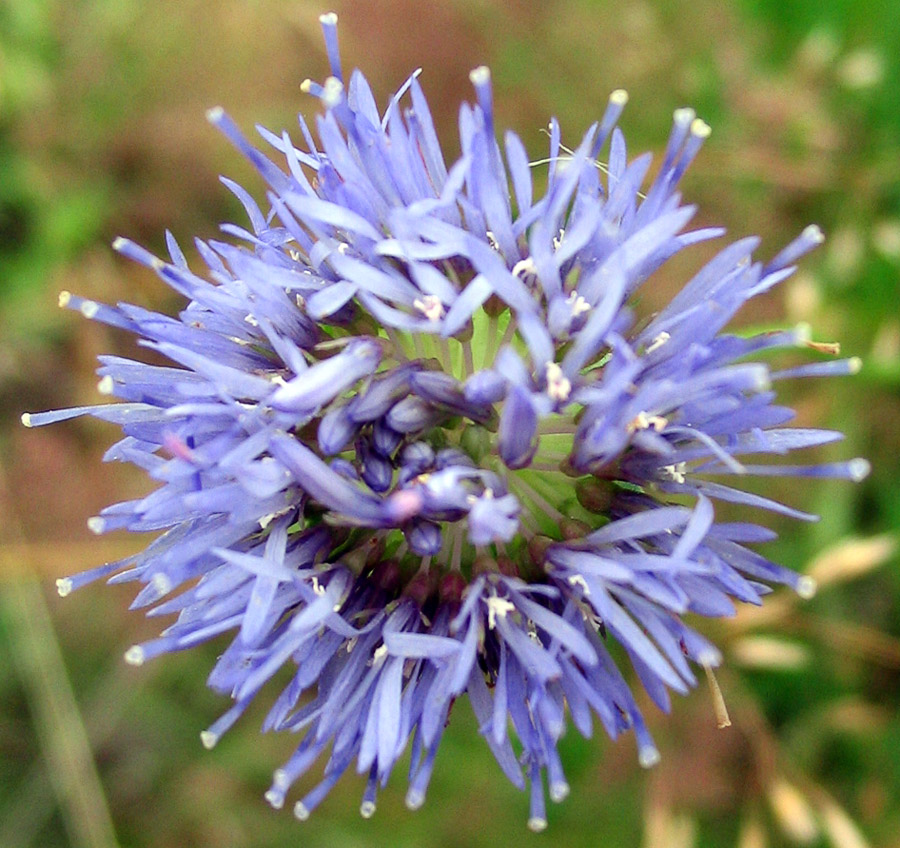
Jasione montana

Sheep's bit scabious is a low biennial or occasionally annual plant growing up to about one foot tall with suberect stems that branch near the base. The leaves are linear, lanceolate, narrow at the base, sinuate, stiffly hairy and forming a rosette. The small violet-blue flowers are in small heads. The bracts are smooth or hairy and the petals have narrow lobes. There are 5 oblong anthers which unite at the base forming a tube, a feature that differentiates this plant from true scabiouses.

The individual florets open successively. The anthers ripen first and later the styles elongate and the two-lobed stigmas are displayed. This is thought to make self-pollination less likely. There are nectaries in the upper part of the ovaries and many insects visit the flowers. Some fifty species of bees and wasps, thirty species of fly, thirty species of butterflies and moths and several beetles have been recorded as visiting the flowers, and therefore this plant is characterized by a generalized pollination syndrome.

The flowers are visible under ultraviolet light and it is believed that this makes them attractive to pollinating insects. They do not show a traditional bull's-eye pattern to guide the insect but the ultraviolet reflectance of the petals is very high.
