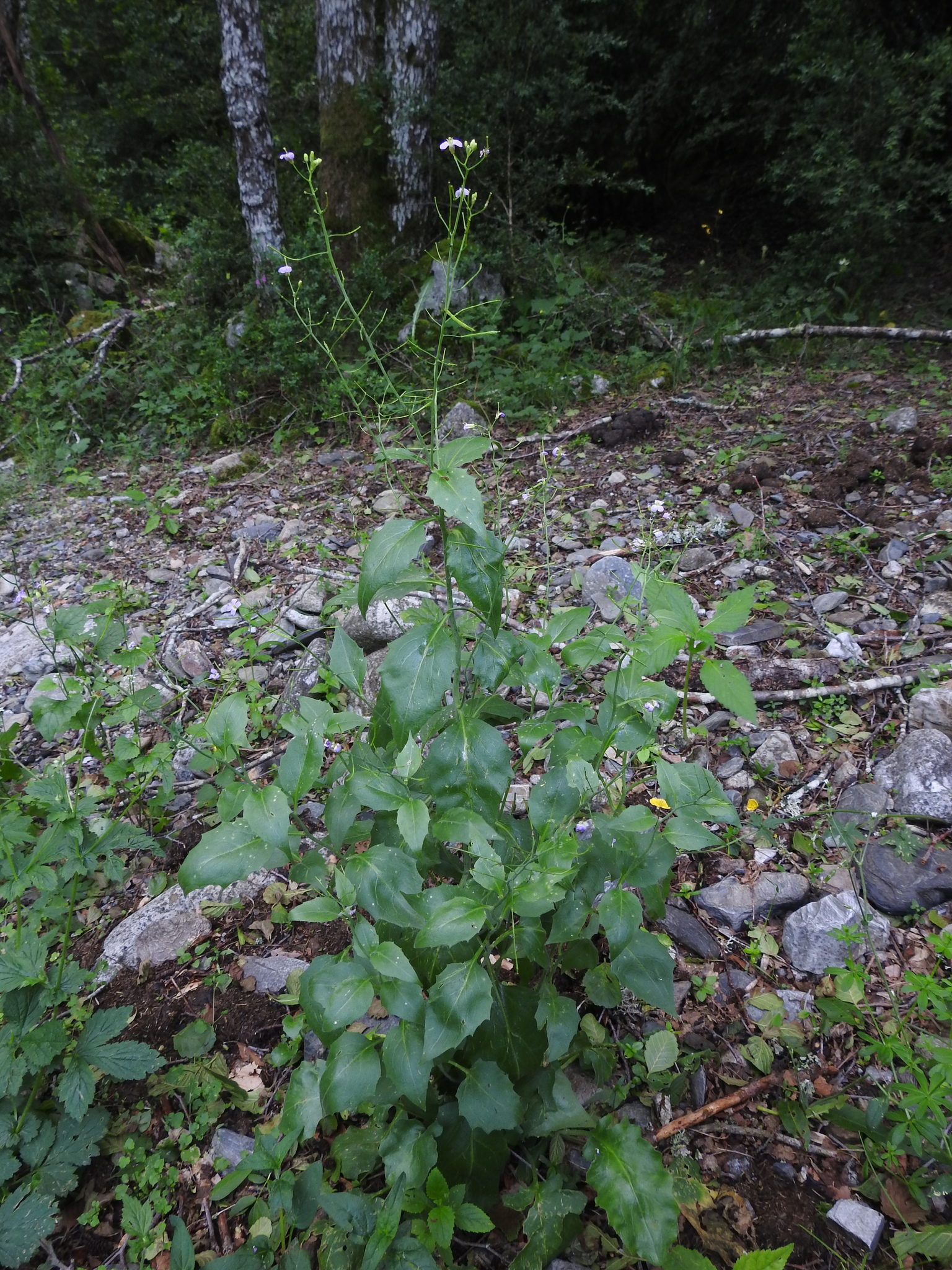

Scientific classification
- Kingdom: Plantae
- Clade: Tracheophytes
- Clade: Angiosperms
- Clade: Eudicots
- Clade: Rosids
- Order: Brassicales
- Family: Brassicaceae
- Genus: Arabidopsis
- Species: A. cebennensis

Binomial name
- Arabidopsis cebennensis (DC.) O'Kane & Al-Shehbaz, 1997

= Arabidopsis cebennensis =

Species of flowering plant

Arabidopsis cebennensis is a species of flowering plant in the family Brassicaceae. It is endemic to France, found in the southern mountains. Stem smooth and erect, with soft hairs.
