= Pseudoarabidopsis =

Scientific classification
- Kingdom: Plantae
- Clade: Tracheophytes
- Clade: Angiosperms
- Clade: Eudicots
- Clade: Rosids
- Order: Brassicales
- Family: Brassicaceae
- Genus: Pseudoarabidopsis; Al-Shehbaz, O'Kane & R.A.Price
- Species: P. toxophylla

Binomial name
- Pseudoarabidopsis toxophylla (M.Bieb.) Al-Shehbaz, O'Kane & R.A.Price

Synonyms
- Arabidopsis toxophylla (M.Bieb.) N.Busch; Arabis toxophylla M.Bieb. (1819) (basionym); Arabis wolgensis Willd. ex Ledeb.; Hesperis toxophylla Kuntze; Sisymbrium toxophyllum (M.Bieb.) C.A.Mey.; Stenophragma toxophyllum B.Fedtsch.; Thellungiella toxophylla (M.Bieb.) V.I.Dorof.

Genus of plants

Pseudoarabidopsis is a genus of flowering plants belonging to the family Brassicaceae. It includes a single species, Pseudoarabidopsis toxophylla, a biennial or perennial which ranges from Crimea and Ukraine through southern and eastern European Russia to Kazakhstan, western Siberia, and the Altai Mountains.
