= Arabidopsis Biological Resource Center =

Research center at Ohio State University

The Arabidopsis Biological Resource Center (ABRC) was established at Ohio State University in September, 1991. Primary support for the ABRC is provided by a National Science Foundation grant. The mission of the ABRC is to acquire, preserve and distribute seed and DNA resources that are useful to the Arabidopsis research community.

New seed and DNA enter ABRC through donation by national and international researchers. An identifying number is assigned to each stock. The stock is then evaluated, documented and made available for distribution. The preservation of seed and DNA stocks is conducted according to strict, defined protocols. Backups of stocks are maintained to ensure preservation.

The ABRC's holdings and stock distribution rates have increased rapidly so that presently hundreds of thousands of stocks are available. More than 100,000 stocks are shipped annually to researchers in more than 60 countries, and modest fees for stocks are charged as part of a not-for-profit cost-recovery strategy.

The ABRC database functions and ordering system are incorporated into The Arabidopsis Information Resource (TAIR). Researchers can obtain information about Arabidopsis, perform stock searches, order stocks, and view current and past orders.

They welcome new seed and DNA stock donations at any time.

== See also ==
- Arabidopsis thaliana
- Nottingham Arabidopsis Stock Centre
