= Schrenkiella (plant) =

Scientific classification
- Kingdom: Plantae
- Clade: Tracheophytes
- Clade: Angiosperms
- Clade: Eudicots
- Clade: Rosids
- Order: Brassicales
- Family: Brassicaceae
- Genus: Schrenkiella; D.A.German & Al-Shehbaz
- Species: S. parvula

Binomial name
- Schrenkiella parvula (Schrenk) D.A.German & Al-Shehbaz

Synonyms
- Arabidopsis parvula (Schrenk) O.E.Schulz; Diplotaxis parvula Schrenk (1844) (basionym); Eutrema parvulum (Schrenk) Al-Shehbaz & Warwick; Sisymbrium parvulum Lipsky; Stenophragma parvulum B.Fedtsch.; Thellungiella parvula (Schrenk) Al-Shehbaz & O'Kane

Genus of plants

Schrenkiella is a genus of flowering plants belonging to the family Brassicaceae. It contains a single species, Schrenkiella parvula, an annual which ranges from southeastern European Russia to Xinjiang, and from central Turkey to the Transcaucasus.

This plant flourishes in extremely salty environments.
