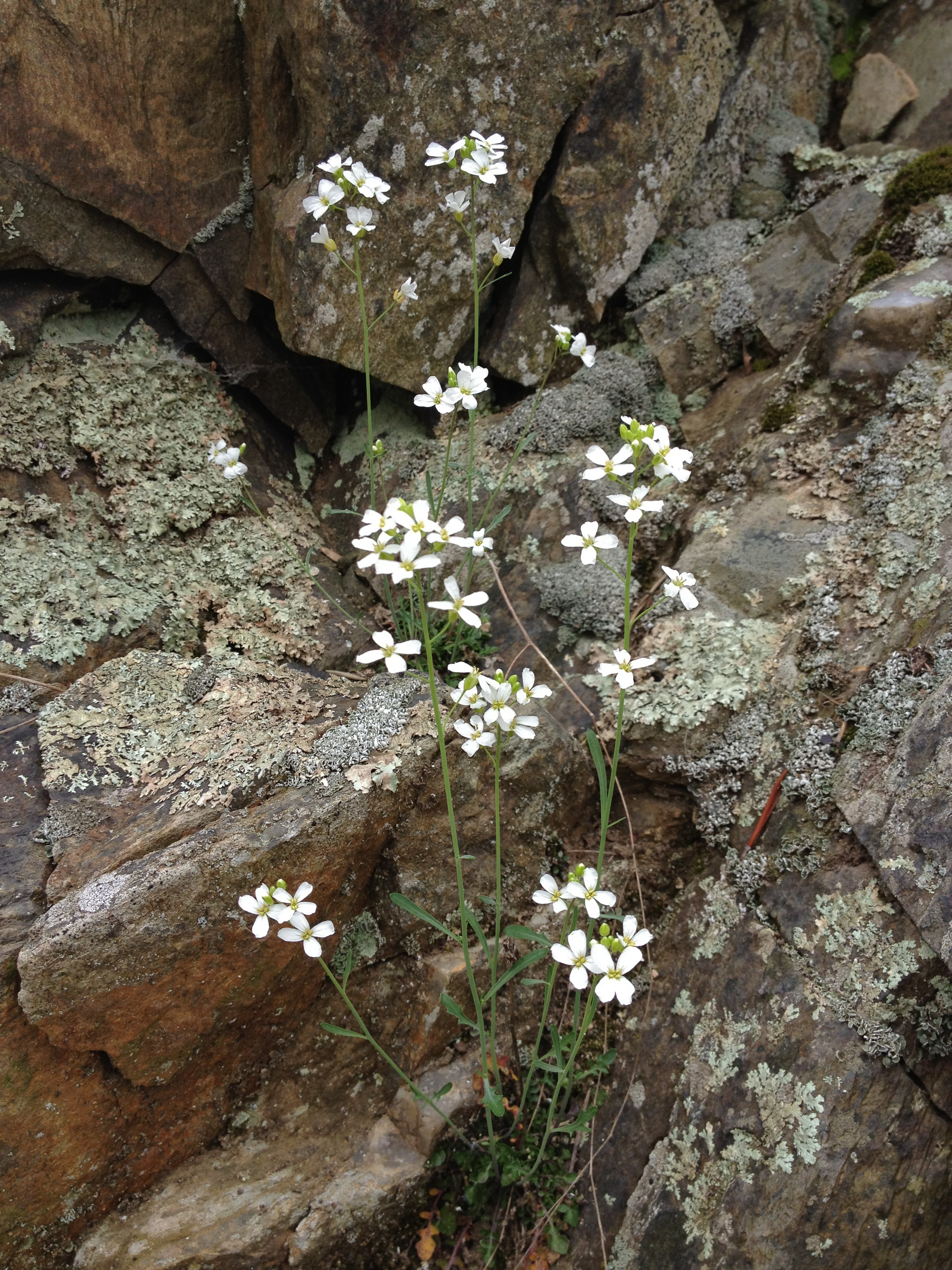

Scientific classification
- Kingdom: Plantae
- Clade: Tracheophytes
- Clade: Angiosperms
- Clade: Eudicots
- Clade: Rosids
- Order: Brassicales
- Family: Brassicaceae
- Genus: Arabidopsis
- Species: A. lyrata

Binomial name
- Arabidopsis lyrata (L.) O'Kane & Al-Shehbaz

Synonyms
- Arabis lyrata L.

= Arabidopsis lyrata =

Species of flowering plant

Arabidopsis lyrata, the lyrate rockcress, is a species of flowering plant in the family Brassicaceae, closely related to the model organism Arabidopsis thaliana.

== Description ==
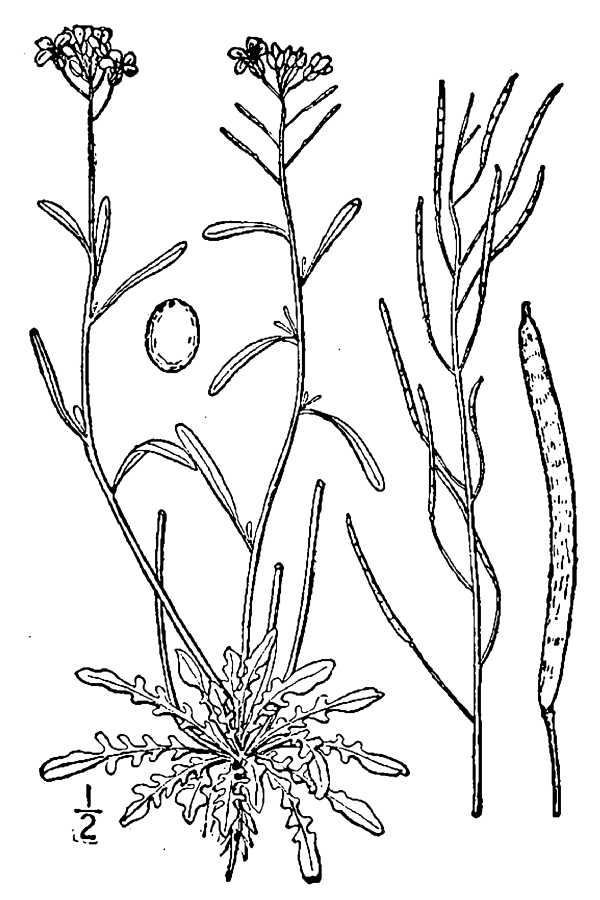
Botanical illustration of Arabidopsis lyrata (1913)

Arabidopsis lyrata are diploid plants that have a life span of two or more years, small white flowers and highly distinct basal leaves with a height of 10–40 centimetres (4–16 in). The stem leaves are arranged alternately, with linear and slightly curved margins that are smooth and having a base that is tapered. The leaves of Arabidopsis lyrata have glucosinolates and trichomes as defense mechanisms against insect herbivores, and any other potential threats, such as fires and human activity.

"The flowers on this species are quite tiny, ranging from 3–8 mm in size, they are pure white with four lobes, and are borne on wide rising pedicels, that range from 7 to 12 mm in length." These plants are insect pollinated and tend to bloom between the months of May right through June and produces fruits in early August. The fruit of Arabidopsis lyrata are about 2–4.5 millimetres (0.08–0.18 in) in length, elongated, and papery, while the seeds are 1 mm (0.04 in) long, and are arranged in a row .

== Habitat and range ==
Arabidopsis lyrata is found largely in subarctic or subalpine environments with thin soils, such as rock faces, eskers and talus slopes, or exposed coastal zones. Individual plants may form solitary rosettes, and are able to reproduce asexually through clonal patches. Lastly, Arabidopsis does not survive in agro-ecosystems in which weeds are rampant; it performs best under low competition and therefore has a life cycle that depends on germination, growth, and the setting of seeds in a very short amount of time before other species of plants can prevent light access.

Arabidopsis lyrata has a circumpolar distribution, meaning it is found across northern and central Europe, Asia, and North America. In the US state of Virginia, it can be found growing in rocky woodlands, barrens, and crevices or thin-soiled ledges on outcrops of limestone, dolomite, siltstone, metasiltstone, amphibolite, metabasalt, diabase, and other mafic and felsic igneous and metamorphic rocks. It is also located in areas of the eastern United States where it is usually limited to sand bars. In Europe it has been found in southern Germany and restricted areas of Sweden.

== Conservation ==
Arabidopsis lyrata has a large geographic range, but is often restricted to small, isolated populations, leading to conservation status that varies among jurisdictions. It is considered scarce but not threatened in the United Kingdom; its distribution is highly scattered throughout Scotland with single populations in Wales and Shetland. It is endangered or threatened in several states in the United States, which include Ohio, Vermont, and Massachusetts. Nevertheless, Arabidopsis lyrata is not included in the IUCN Red List.

== Physiology ==
Geographically isolated populations, within Europe, of Arabidopsis lyrata ssp. petraea have been shown to be metabolically different to each other. These populations also have distinct metabolism when exposed to cold temperatures in experimental conditions.

== Reproduction ==
North American populations of Arabidopsis lyrata ssp. lyrata are typically outcrossing in the center of the distribution but exhibit a shift to selfing at range margins.

== Importance to humans ==
Arabidopsis species provide the ability to address questions in speciation research due to the fact that they have a relatively short reproductive cycle and are easy to maintain. "Also, Arabidopsis lyrata varies considerably in habit preference, adaptation to local environment, life history strategies, genome structure, mating system, and chromosome number." It has been particularly useful in understanding how populations diverge and how reproductive barriers arise. Arabidopsis species have also been eaten by indigenous people of Alaska, who eat the leaves by cooking them as a vegetable or use them as raw in salads.

== Importance to ecosystem ==
The species that grow with Arabidopsis lyrata are Senecio obovatus, Viburnum rafinesquianum, Micranthes virginiensis, Asplenium platyneuron, Campanula rotundifolia, Carya species, Woodsia ilvensis, and Aquilegia canadensis. Arabidopsis lyrata is eaten by many herbivores such as the cabbage white butterfly, Pieris brassicae. It is a known host to the pathogenic fungus species Phoma herbarum.
