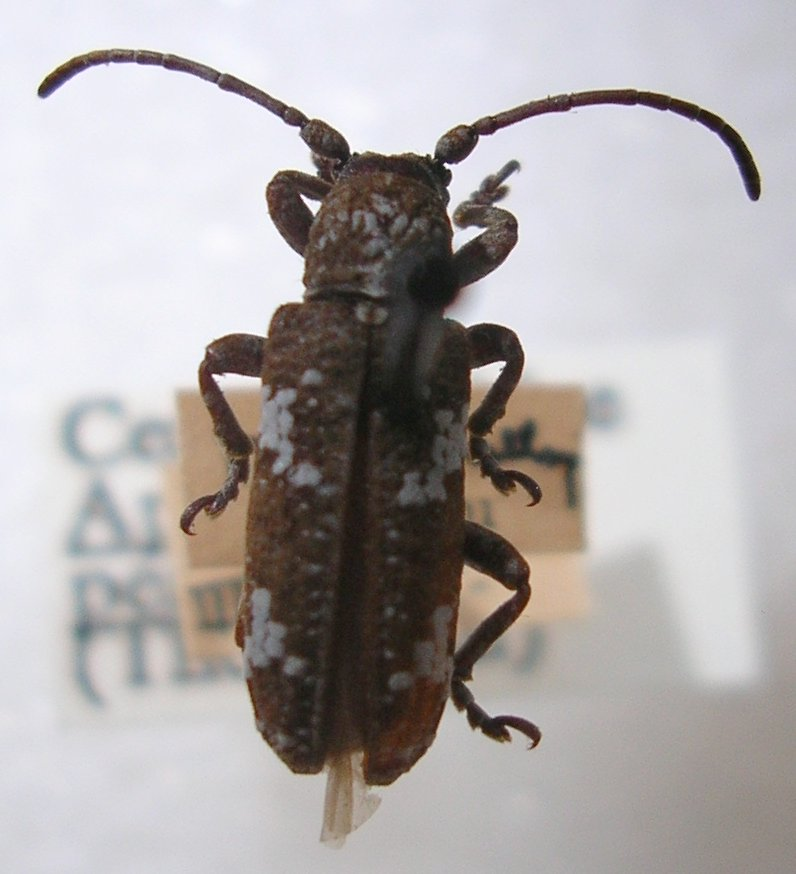
- Apomecyna saltator

Scientific classification
- Kingdom: Animalia
- Phylum: Arthropoda
- Clade: Pancrustacea
- Class: Insecta
- Order: Coleoptera
- Suborder: Polyphaga
- Infraorder: Cucujiformia
- Family: Cerambycidae
- Subfamily: Lamiinae
- Tribe: Apomecynini

Synonyms
- Adétides Candèze in Lacordaire, 1872; Agennopsides Lacordaire, 1872; Ischiolonchides Lacordaire, 1872; Ptéricoptides Lacordaire, 1872; Ptericoptini (Lacordaire)

= Apomecynini =

Tribe of beetles

Apomecynini is a tribe of longhorn beetles of the subfamily Lamiinae.

== Taxonomy ==
- Acanthosybra Breuning, 1939
- Acestrilla Bates, 1885
- Acrepidopterum Fisher, 1926
- Adetaptera Santos-Silva, Nascimento & Wappes, 2019
- Adetus LeConte, 1852
- Aethiopia Aurivillius, 1911
- Albasor Vlasák & Santos-Silva, 2025
- Aletretiopsis Breuning, 1940
- Alluaudia Lameere, 1893
- Amblesthidopsis Aurivillius, 1921
- Ametacyna Hüdepohl, 1995
- Amphicnaeia Bates, 1866
- Ancornallis Fisher, 1935
- Anxylotoles Fisher, 1935
- Apomecyna Latreille, 1829
- Apomecynoides Breuning, 1950
- Apterapomecyna Breuning, 1970
- Asaperda Bates, 1873
- Assinia Lameere, 1893
- Asyngenes Bates, 1880
- Atelais Pascoe, 1867
- Athylia Pascoe, 1864
- Atimura Pascoe, 1863
- Atrichocera Aurivillius, 1911
- Auxa Pascoe, 1860
- Baudona Breuning, 1963
- Bebelis Thomson, 1864
- Bisaltes Thomson, 1868
- Bityle Pascoe, 1865
- Brachyelosoma Breuning, 1958
- Brachysybra Breuning
- Bybe Pascoe, 1866
- Bybeana Hüdepohl, 1996
- Callomecyna Tippmann, 1965
- Catuaba Martins & Galileo, 2003
- Cauca Lane, 1970
- Ceylanosybra Breuning, 1975
- Clavisybra Breuning, 1943
- Coomanum Pic, 1927
- Cornallis Thomson, 1864
- Craspedoderus Thomson, 1864
- Cristepilysta Breuning, 1951
- Cristoopsis Dillon & Dillon, 1952
- Cylindrosybra Aurivillius, 1922
- Cyrtinoopsis Dillon & Dillon, 1952
- Diamecyna Breuning, 1939
- Diasybra Breuning, 1959
- Diaxenes C. Waterhouse, 1884
- Discolops Fairmaire, 1886
- Dolichoropica Breuning, 1970
- Dolichosybra Breuning, 1942
- Doliops Waterhouse, 1841
- Dorcasta Pascoe, 1858
- Dyemus Pascoe, 1864
- Dymascus Pascoe, 1865
- Ebaeides Pascoe, 1864
- Elaidius Breuning, 1942
- Elongatosybra Breuning, 1961
- Enaretta Thomson, 1864
- Enispiella Breuning, 1938
- Eosybra Breuning, 1942
- Epaphra Newman, 1842
- Epilysta Pascoe, 1865
- Epilystoides Breuning, 1939
- Eremon Thomson, 1864
- Eremophanes Kolbe, 1894
- Eremophanoides Breuning, 1978
- Eremosybra Breuning, 1942
- Estigmenida Gahan, 1895
- Euryplocia Breuning, 1939
- Euryzeargyrea Breuning, 1957
- Euteleuta Bates, 1885
- Eyiaba Galileo & Martins, 2004
- Falsepilysta Breuning, 1939
- Falsischnolea Breuning, 1940
- Falsomoechotypa Breuning, 1954
- Falsomoechotypoides Breuning, 1959
- Falsoparmena Breuning, 1943
- Falsoropica Breuning, 1939
- Falsoropicoides Breuning, 1965
- Falsozorispiella Breuning, 1963
- Gemylus Pascoe, 1865
- Hestimidius Breuning, 1939
- Hestimoides Breuning, 1939
- Hippaphesis Thomson, 1864
- Hispomorpha Newman, 1842
- Hyagnis Pascoe, 1864
- Ichthyodes Newman, 1842
- Iproca Gressitt, 1940
- Irundiaba Martins & Galileo, 2008
- Ischioloncha Thomson, 1860
- Kuatunia Gressitt, 1951
- Lagriadoliops Barševskis, 2014
- Lamprobityle Heller, 1923
- Laosepilysta Breuning, 1965
- Leptophaula Breuning, 1940
- Metamecyna Breuning, 1939
- Metamecynopsis Hüdepohl, 1995
- Metepilysta Breuning, 1970
- Meximia Pascoe, 1865
- Microlera Bates, 1873
- Microleroides Breuning, 1956
- Microloa Aurivillius, 1924
- Microplocia Heller, 1924
- Mimaelara Breuning, 1959
- Mimamblesthidus Breuning, 1961
- Mimassinia Breuning, 1965
- Mimatimura Breuning, 1939
- Mimatybe Breuning, 1957
- Mimecyroschema Breuning, 1969
- Mimepilysta Breuning, 1959
- Mimobybe Breuning, 1970
- Mimodiaxenes Breuning, 1939
- Mimofalsoropica Breuning, 1975
- Mimohyagnis Breuning, 1940
- Mimononyma Breuning, 1960
- Mimononymoides Breuning & Villiers, 1972
- Mimoopsis Breuning, 1942
- Mimophaeopate Breuning, 1967
- Mimopothyne Breuning, 1956
- Mimoropica Breuning & de Jong, 1941
- Mimosybra Breuning, 1939
- Mimotetrorea Breuning, 1973
- Mimoxenoleoides Breuning, 1963
- Mycerinopsis Thomson, 1864
- Mynonoma Pascoe, 1865
- Neosybra Breuning, 1939
- Nicomioides Breuning, 1939
- Niphoropica Breuning, 1947
- Niphosaperda Breuning, 1962
- Novorondonia Özdikmen, 2008
- Ogmodera Aurivillius, 1908
- Ogmoderidius Breuning, 1939
- Oopsidius Breuning, 1939
- Oopsis Fairmaire, 1850
- Orcesis Pascoe, 1866
- Orinoeme Pascoe, 1867
- Osckayia Perez-Flores & Santos-Silva, 2021
- Palausybra Gressitt, 1956
- Palpicrassus Galileo & Martins, 2007
- Parabybe Schwarzer, 1930
- Paracanthosybra Breuning, 1980
- Paracornallis Breuning, 1969
- Paradoliops Breuning, 1959
- Paradyemus Breuning, 1951
- Paraesylacris Breuning, 1940
- Parahathlia Breuning, 1961
- Parahyagnis Breuning, 1970
- Paramblesthidopsis Breuning, 1981
- Paramecyna Aurivillius, 1910
- Paranicomia Breuning, 1964
- Parapomecyna Breuning, 1968
- Parastathmodera Breuning, 1981
- Parasybrodiboma Breuning, 1969
- Paratheresina Breuning, 1975
- Parathylia Breuning, 1958
- Parauxa Breuning, 1940
- Parazorilispe Breuning, 1940
- Parepilysta Breuning, 1939
- Pareunidia Breuning, 1967
- Parichthyodes Breuning, 1959
- Pariproca Breuning, 1968
- Pemptolasius Gahan, 1890
- Phaeopate Pascoe, 1865
- Philomecyna Kolbe, 1894
- Phrynidius Lacordaire, 1869
- Pithodia Pascoe, 1865
- Plocia Newman, 1842
- Plociella Breuning, 1949
- Poromecyna Aurivillius, 1911
- Potiatuca Galileo & Martins, 2006
- Praonethomimus Breuning, 1939
- Prosenella Lane, 1959
- Pseudaelara Heller, 1912
- Pseudapomecyna Breuning, 1954
- Pseudepectasis Breuning, 1940
- Pseudepilysta Hüdepohl, 1996
- Pseudodoliops Vives, 2012
- Pseudokamikiria Breuning, 1964
- Pseudoopsis Breuning, 1956
- Pseudoropica Breuning, 1968
- Pseudorucentra Breuning, 1948
- Pseudostenidea Breuning, 1953
- Pseudosybra Breuning, 1960
- Pseudosybroides Breuning, 1979
- Pseudozorilispe Breuning, 1976
- Ptericoptus Lepeletier & Audinet-Serville in Lacordaire, 1830
- Pulchrodiboma Breuning, 1947
- Ramularius Aurivillius, 1908
- Rhadia Pascoe, 1867
- Ropica Pascoe, 1858
- Ropicapomecyna Breuning, 1958
- Ropicella Breuning, 1940
- Ropicomimus Breuning, 1939
- Ropicosybra Pic, 1945
- Rosalba Thomson, 1864
- Rucentra Schwarzer, 1931
- Sarillus Bates, 1885
- Schoutedenius Breuning, 1954
- Setoropica Breuning, 1965
- Skillmania Santos-Silva, Nascimento & Wappes, 2019
- Somatolita Aurivillius, 1914
- Souvanna Breuning, 1963
- Spineuteleuta Breuning, 1961
- Stathmodera Gahan, 1890
- Stenocoptoides Breuning, 1942
- Stenocoptus Kolbe, 1894
- Stenopausa Breuning, 1940
- Subinermexocentrus Breuning, 1972
- Sybra Pascoe, 1865
- Sybrohyagnis Breuning, 1960
- Sybromimus Breuning, 1940
- Sybroopsis Breuning, 1949
- Symperga Lacordaire, 1872
- Sympergoides Lane, 1970
- Taiwanajinga Hayashi, 1978
- Tethystola Thomson, 1868
- Tetrarpages Thomson, 1868
- Theresina Breuning, 1963
- Trichatelais Breuning, 1953
- Tricheunidia Breuning, 1940
- Trichohestima Breuning, 1943
- Trichomecyna Breuning, 1939
- Trichoparmenonta Breuning, 1943
- Tuberculosybra Breuning, 1948
- Tucumaniella Breuning, 1943
- Tyloxoles Kriesche, 1927
- Typophaula Thomson, 1868
- Undulatodoliops Breuning, 1968
- Vandenbergheius Heffern, Santos-Silva & Botero, 2019
- Vitalisia Pic, 1924
- Xylariopsis Bates, 1884
- Xylosybra Breuning, 1939
- Ypomacena Martins, Galileo & Santos-Silva, 2016
- Zeargyrodes Fisher, 1925
- Zorilispe Pascoe, 1865
- Zorilispiella Breuning, 1959
- Zotale Pascoe, 1866
