= Cauca =

Cauca may refer to:

- Cauca Department, an administrative division of Colombia
- Valle del Cauca Department, an administrative division of Colombia
- Cauca Department (Gran Colombia), former administrative division
- Cauca, an extinct Choco language
- Cauca River
- Coca, Segovia, Spain; the Latin name was Cauca
- Cauca guan, a bird
- Cauca (beetle), a genus of insects in the family Cerambycidae
