= Metamecyna flavoapicalis =

Scientific classification
- Kingdom: Animalia
- Phylum: Arthropoda
- Class: Insecta
- Order: Coleoptera
- Suborder: Polyphaga
- Infraorder: Cucujiformia
- Family: Cerambycidae
- Genus: Metamecyna
- Species: M. flavoapicalis

Binomial name
- Metamecyna flavoapicalis Breuning, 1969

Species of beetle

Metamecyna flavoapicalis is a species of beetle in the family Cerambycidae. It was described by Breuning in 1969.
