= Microplocia =

Scientific classification
- Kingdom: Animalia
- Phylum: Arthropoda
- Class: Insecta
- Order: Coleoptera
- Suborder: Polyphaga
- Infraorder: Cucujiformia
- Family: Cerambycidae
- Subfamily: Lamiinae
- Tribe: Apomecynini
- Genus: Microplocia; Heller, 1924

Genus of beetles

Microplocia is a genus of beetles in the family Cerambycidae, containing the following species:

- Microplocia borneensis Breuning, 1956
- Microplocia puncticollis Heller, 1924
- Microplocia sybroides Breuning, 1942
- Microplocia tonkinensis Breuning, 1963
