= Apterapomecyna =

Scientific classification
- Kingdom: Animalia
- Phylum: Arthropoda
- Class: Insecta
- Order: Coleoptera
- Suborder: Polyphaga
- Infraorder: Cucujiformia
- Family: Cerambycidae
- Subfamily: Lamiinae
- Tribe: Apomecynini
- Genus: Apterapomecyna; Breuning, 1970
- Species: A. rufobrunnea

Binomial name
- Apterapomecyna rufobrunnea Breuning, 1970

Genus of beetles

Apterapomecyna rufobrunnea is a species of beetle in the family Cerambycidae, and the only species in the genus Apterapomecyna. It was described by Breuning in 1970.
