= Dolichosybra apicalis =

Scientific classification
- Kingdom: Animalia
- Phylum: Arthropoda
- Class: Insecta
- Order: Coleoptera
- Suborder: Polyphaga
- Infraorder: Cucujiformia
- Family: Cerambycidae
- Genus: Dolichosybra
- Species: D. apicalis

Binomial name
- Dolichosybra apicalis (Gilmour, 1963)

Species of beetle

Dolichosybra apicalis is a species of beetle in the family Cerambycidae. It was described by Gilmour in 1963.
