= Brachyelosoma =

Scientific classification
- Kingdom: Animalia
- Phylum: Arthropoda
- Class: Insecta
- Order: Coleoptera
- Suborder: Polyphaga
- Infraorder: Cucujiformia
- Family: Cerambycidae
- Subfamily: Lamiinae
- Tribe: Apomecynini
- Genus: Brachyelosoma
- Species: B. mindanaonis

Binomial name
- Brachyelosoma mindanaonis Breuning, 1958

Genus of beetles

Brachyelosoma mindanaonis is a species of beetle in the family Cerambycidae, and the only species in the genus Brachyelosoma. It was described by Breuning in 1958.
