= Asaperda meridiana =

Scientific classification
- Domain: Eukaryota
- Kingdom: Animalia
- Phylum: Arthropoda
- Class: Insecta
- Order: Coleoptera
- Suborder: Polyphaga
- Infraorder: Cucujiformia
- Family: Cerambycidae
- Genus: Asaperda
- Species: A. meridiana

Binomial name
- Asaperda meridiana Matsusushita, 1931

Species of beetle

Asaperda meridiana is a species of beetle in the family Cerambycidae. It was described by Matsusushita in 1931.
