= Brachysybra =

Scientific classification
- Kingdom: Animalia
- Phylum: Arthropoda
- Class: Insecta
- Order: Coleoptera
- Suborder: Polyphaga
- Infraorder: Cucujiformia
- Family: Cerambycidae
- Tribe: Apomecynini
- Genus: Brachysybra

Genus of beetles

Brachysybra is a genus of beetles in the family Cerambycidae, containing the following species:

- Brachysybra elliptica Breuning, 1940
- Brachysybra unicolor Breuning, 1957
