= Microloa =

Scientific classification
- Kingdom: Animalia
- Phylum: Arthropoda
- Class: Insecta
- Order: Coleoptera
- Suborder: Polyphaga
- Infraorder: Cucujiformia
- Family: Cerambycidae
- Tribe: Apomecynini
- Genus: Microloa; Aurivillius, 1924
- Species: M. niveopunctata

Binomial name
- Microloa niveopunctata Aurivillius, 1924

Genus of beetles

Microloa is a monotypic beetle genus in the family Cerambycidae described by Per Olof Christopher Aurivillius in 1924. Its only species, Microloa niveopunctata, was described by the same author in the same year
