= Euteleuta =

Scientific classification
- Kingdom: Animalia
- Phylum: Arthropoda
- Class: Insecta
- Order: Coleoptera
- Suborder: Polyphaga
- Infraorder: Cucujiformia
- Family: Cerambycidae
- Tribe: Apomecynini
- Genus: Euteleuta

Genus of beetles

Euteleuta is a genus of beetles in the family Cerambycidae, containing the following species:

- Euteleuta fimbriata Bates, 1885
- Euteleuta laticauda Bates, 1885
- Euteleuta venezuelensis Breuning, 1971
