= Dolichosybra =

Scientific classification
- Kingdom: Animalia
- Phylum: Arthropoda
- Class: Insecta
- Order: Coleoptera
- Suborder: Polyphaga
- Infraorder: Cucujiformia
- Family: Cerambycidae
- Subfamily: Lamiinae
- Tribe: Apomecynini
- Genus: Dolichosybra; Breuning, 1942

Genus of beetles

Dolichosybra is a genus of beetles in the family Cerambycidae, containing the following species:

- Dolichosybra annulicornis Breuning, 1942
- Dolichosybra apicalis (Gilmour, 1963)
- Dolichosybra elongata Breuning, 1942
- Dolichosybra strandi Breuning, 1943
- Dolichosybra strandiella Breuning, 1942
- Dolichosybra tubericollis Breuning, 1942
