= Mimoopsis insularis =

Scientific classification
- Kingdom: Animalia
- Phylum: Arthropoda
- Class: Insecta
- Order: Coleoptera
- Suborder: Polyphaga
- Infraorder: Cucujiformia
- Family: Cerambycidae
- Genus: Mimoopsis
- Species: M. insularis

Binomial name
- Mimoopsis insularis (Breuning, 1939)

Species of beetle

Mimoopsis insularis is a species of beetle in the family Cerambycidae. It was described by Breuning in 1939.
