= Ropicosybra multipunctata =

Scientific classification
- Kingdom: Animalia
- Phylum: Arthropoda
- Class: Insecta
- Order: Coleoptera
- Suborder: Polyphaga
- Infraorder: Cucujiformia
- Family: Cerambycidae
- Genus: Ropicosybra
- Species: R. multipunctata

Binomial name
- Ropicosybra multipunctata (Pic, 1927)

Synonyms
- Orcesis multipunctatus Pic, 1927

Species of beetle

Ropicosybra multipunctata is a species of beetle in the family Cerambycidae. It was described by Pic in 1927. It is known from Vietnam.
