= Iproca aoyamaorum =

Scientific classification
- Domain: Eukaryota
- Kingdom: Animalia
- Phylum: Arthropoda
- Class: Insecta
- Order: Coleoptera
- Suborder: Polyphaga
- Infraorder: Cucujiformia
- Family: Cerambycidae
- Genus: Iproca
- Species: I. aoyamaorum

Binomial name
- Iproca aoyamaorum Hasegawa & Ohbayashi, 2006

Species of beetle

Iproca aoyamaorum is a species of beetle in the family Cerambycidae. It was described by Hasegawa and Ohbayashi in 2006.
