= Aethiopia lesnei =

Scientific classification
- Kingdom: Animalia
- Phylum: Arthropoda
- Class: Insecta
- Order: Coleoptera
- Suborder: Polyphaga
- Infraorder: Cucujiformia
- Family: Cerambycidae
- Genus: Aethiopia
- Species: A. lesnei

Binomial name
- Aethiopia lesnei Breuning, 1948

Species of beetle

Aethiopia lesnei is a species of beetle in the family Cerambycidae. It was described by Stephan von Breuning in 1948.
