= Eremosybra flavolineatoides =

Scientific classification
- Kingdom: Animalia
- Phylum: Arthropoda
- Class: Insecta
- Order: Coleoptera
- Suborder: Polyphaga
- Infraorder: Cucujiformia
- Family: Cerambycidae
- Genus: Eremosybra
- Species: E. flavolineatoides

Binomial name
- Eremosybra flavolineatoides Breuning, 1964

Species of beetle

Eremosybra flavolineatoides is a species of beetles in the family Cerambycidae.
