= Asaperda wadai =

Scientific classification
- Domain: Eukaryota
- Kingdom: Animalia
- Phylum: Arthropoda
- Class: Insecta
- Order: Coleoptera
- Suborder: Polyphaga
- Infraorder: Cucujiformia
- Family: Cerambycidae
- Genus: Asaperda
- Species: A. wadai

Binomial name
- Asaperda wadai Makihara, 1980

Species of beetle

Asaperda wadai is a species of beetle in the family Cerambycidae. It was described by Makihara in 1980.
