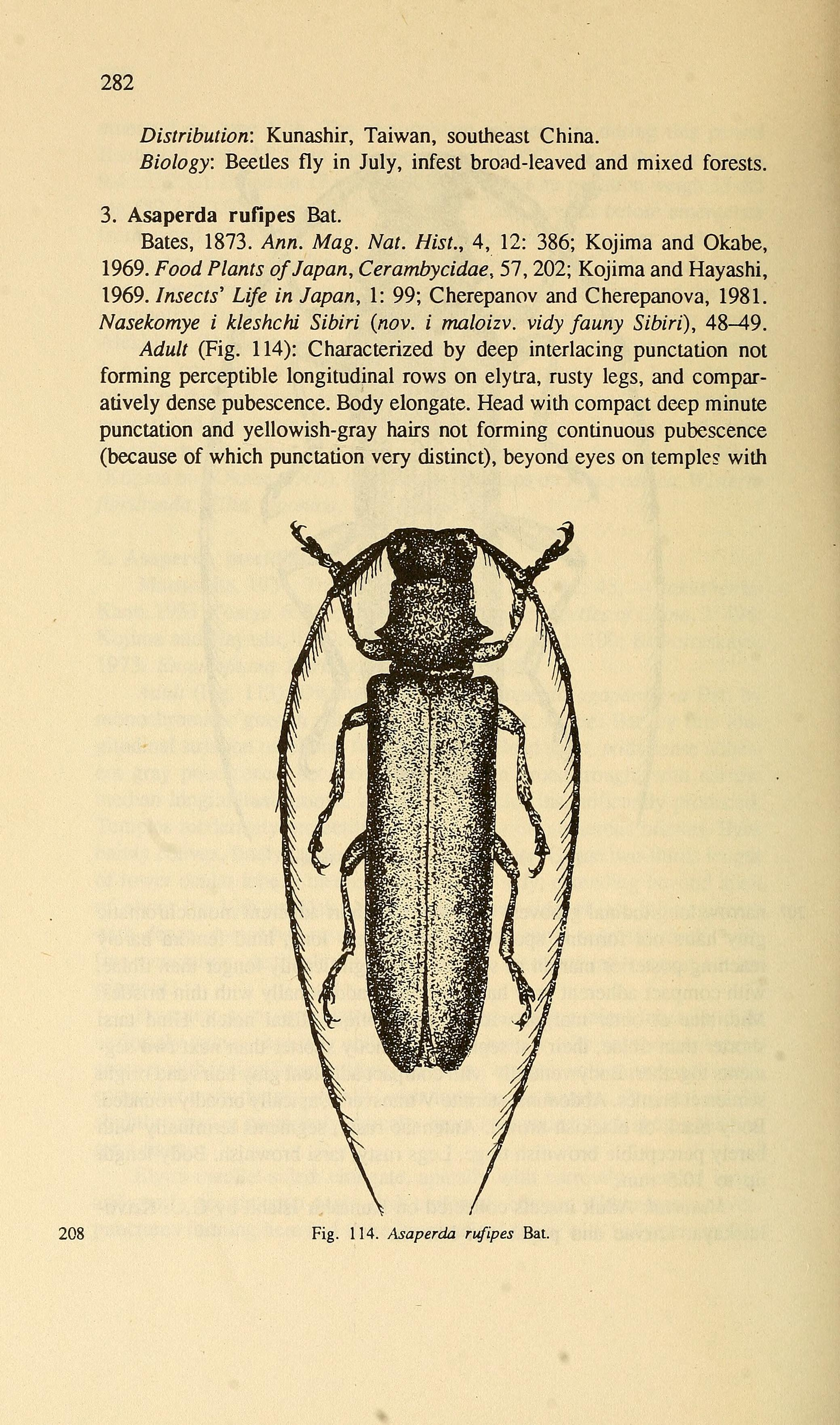

Scientific classification
- Domain: Eukaryota
- Kingdom: Animalia
- Phylum: Arthropoda
- Class: Insecta
- Order: Coleoptera
- Suborder: Polyphaga
- Infraorder: Cucujiformia
- Family: Cerambycidae
- Genus: Asaperda
- Species: A. rufipes

Binomial name
- Asaperda rufipes Bates, 1873

= Asaperda rufipes =

Species of beetle

Asaperda rufipes is a species of beetle in the family Cerambycidae. It was described by Bates in 1873.
