= Mimodiaxenes =

Scientific classification
- Kingdom: Animalia
- Phylum: Arthropoda
- Class: Insecta
- Order: Coleoptera
- Suborder: Polyphaga
- Infraorder: Cucujiformia
- Family: Cerambycidae
- Tribe: Apomecynini
- Genus: Mimodiaxenes; Breuning, 1939
- Species: M. elongata

Binomial name
- Mimodiaxenes elongata Breuning, 1939

Genus of beetles

Mimodiaxenes elongata is a species of beetle in the family Cerambycidae, and the only species in the genus Mimodiaxenes. It was described by Stephan von Breuning in 1939.

It's 12 mm long and 3 mm wide, and its type locality is Kaipe-Taungu, Sumatra.
