= Acestrilla =

Scientific classification
- Domain: Eukaryota
- Kingdom: Animalia
- Phylum: Arthropoda
- Class: Insecta
- Order: Coleoptera
- Suborder: Polyphaga
- Infraorder: Cucujiformia
- Family: Cerambycidae
- Tribe: Apomecynini
- Genus: Acestrilla; Bates, 1885
- Species: A. minima

Binomial name
- Acestrilla minima Bates, 1885

Genus of beetles

Acestrilla minima is a species of beetle in the family Cerambycidae, and the only species in the genus Acestrilla. It was described by Henry Walter Bates in 1885.
