= Lamprobityle mariae =

Scientific classification
- Kingdom: Animalia
- Phylum: Arthropoda
- Class: Insecta
- Order: Coleoptera
- Suborder: Polyphaga
- Infraorder: Cucujiformia
- Family: Cerambycidae
- Genus: Lamprobityle
- Species: L. mariae

Binomial name
- Lamprobityle mariae (Vives, 2009)

Species of beetle

Lamprobityle mariae is a species of beetle in the family Cerambycidae. It was described by Vives in 2009.
