= Anxylotoles =

Scientific classification
- Kingdom: Animalia
- Phylum: Arthropoda
- Class: Insecta
- Order: Coleoptera
- Suborder: Polyphaga
- Infraorder: Cucujiformia
- Family: Cerambycidae
- Subfamily: Lamiinae
- Tribe: Apomecynini
- Genus: Anxylotoles; Fisher, 1935
- Species: A. caudatus

Binomial name
- Anxylotoles caudatus Fisher, 1935

Genus of beetles

Anxylotoles caudatus is a species of beetle in the family Cerambycidae, and the only species in the genus Anxylotoles. It was described by Fisher in 1935.
