= Dyemus undulatolineatus =

Scientific classification
- Kingdom: Animalia
- Phylum: Arthropoda
- Class: Insecta
- Order: Coleoptera
- Suborder: Polyphaga
- Infraorder: Cucujiformia
- Family: Cerambycidae
- Genus: Dyemus
- Species: D. undulatolineatus

Binomial name
- Dyemus undulatolineatus Breuning, 1938

Species of beetle

Dyemus undulatolineatus is a species of beetle in the family Cerambycidae.
