= Pseudostenidea =

Scientific classification
- Kingdom: Animalia
- Phylum: Arthropoda
- Class: Insecta
- Order: Coleoptera
- Suborder: Polyphaga
- Infraorder: Cucujiformia
- Family: Cerambycidae
- Tribe: Apomecynini
- Genus: Pseudostenidea
- Species: P. rufescens

Binomial name
- Pseudostenidea rufescens Breuning, 1953

Genus of beetles

Pseudostenidea rufescens is a species of beetle in the family Cerambycidae, and the only species in the genus Pseudostenidea. It was described by Breuning in 1953.
