= Asaperda silvicultrix =

Scientific classification
- Kingdom: Animalia
- Phylum: Arthropoda
- Class: Insecta
- Order: Coleoptera
- Suborder: Polyphaga
- Infraorder: Cucujiformia
- Family: Cerambycidae
- Genus: Asaperda
- Species: A. silvicultrix

Binomial name
- Asaperda silvicultrix Toyoshima & Iwata, 1990

Species of beetle

Asaperda silvicultrix is a species of beetle in the family Cerambycidae. It was described by Toyoshima and Iwata in 1990. It is commonly found in Japan
