= Bybeana =

Scientific classification
- Domain: Eukaryota
- Kingdom: Animalia
- Phylum: Arthropoda
- Class: Insecta
- Order: Coleoptera
- Suborder: Polyphaga
- Infraorder: Cucujiformia
- Family: Cerambycidae
- Tribe: Apomecynini
- Genus: Bybeana
- Species: B. schawalleri

Binomial name
- Bybeana schawalleri Hüdepohl, 1996

Genus of beetles

Bybeana schawalleri is a species of beetle in the family Cerambycidae, and the only species in the genus Bybeana. It was described by Hüdepohl in 1996.
