= Praonethomimus =

Scientific classification
- Domain: Eukaryota
- Kingdom: Animalia
- Phylum: Arthropoda
- Class: Insecta
- Order: Coleoptera
- Suborder: Polyphaga
- Infraorder: Cucujiformia
- Family: Cerambycidae
- Tribe: Apomecynini
- Genus: Praonethomimus; Breuning, 1939
- Species: P. tuberosithorax

Binomial name
- Praonethomimus tuberosithorax Breuning, 1939

Genus of beetles

Praonethomimus tuberosithorax is a species of beetle in the family Cerambycidae, and the only species in the genus Praonethomimus. It was described by Stephan von Breuning in 1939.

It is 6⅓–9 mm long and 2⅓–3 mm wide, and its type locality is "Pyonchaung Res., N. Toungoo", Myanmar.
