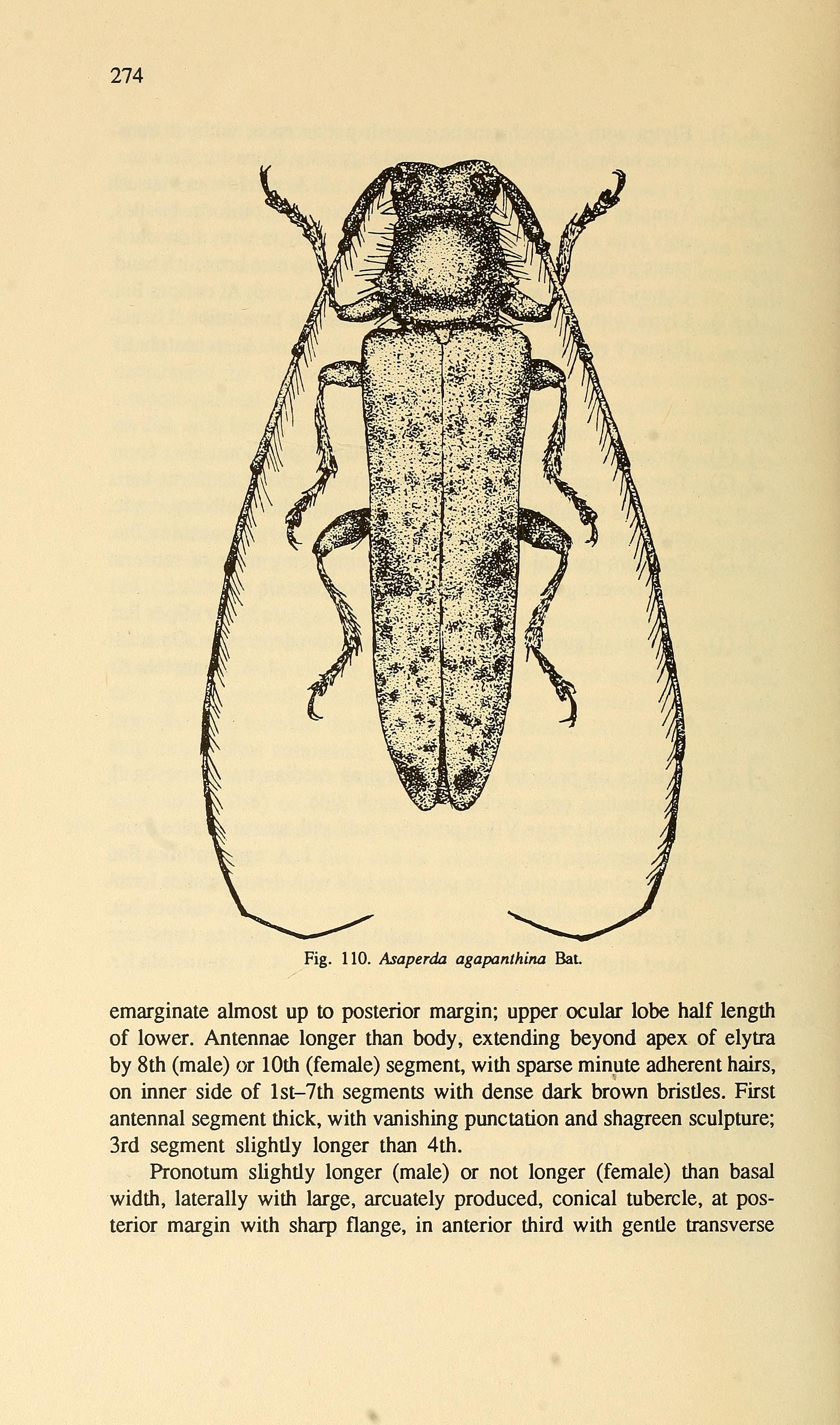
- Asaperda agapanthina

Scientific classification
- Domain: Eukaryota
- Kingdom: Animalia
- Phylum: Arthropoda
- Class: Insecta
- Order: Coleoptera
- Suborder: Polyphaga
- Infraorder: Cucujiformia
- Family: Cerambycidae
- Subfamily: Lamiinae
- Tribe: Apomecynini
- Genus: Asaperda; Bates, 1873

= Asaperda =

Genus of beetles

Asaperda is a genus of beetles in the family Cerambycidae, containing the following species:

- Asaperda agapanthina Bates, 1873
- Asaperda bicostata Hayashi, 1956
- Asaperda chongqingensis Chen & Chiang, 1993
- Asaperda maculosa Pic, 1927
- Asaperda meridiana Matsusushita, 1931
- Asaperda rufa Breuning, 1954
- Asaperda rufipes Bates, 1873
- Asaperda stenostola Kraatz, 1873
- Asaperda silvicultrix Toyoshima & Iwata, 1990
- Asaperda tenuicornis Komiya, 1984
- Asaperda wadai Makihara, 1980
