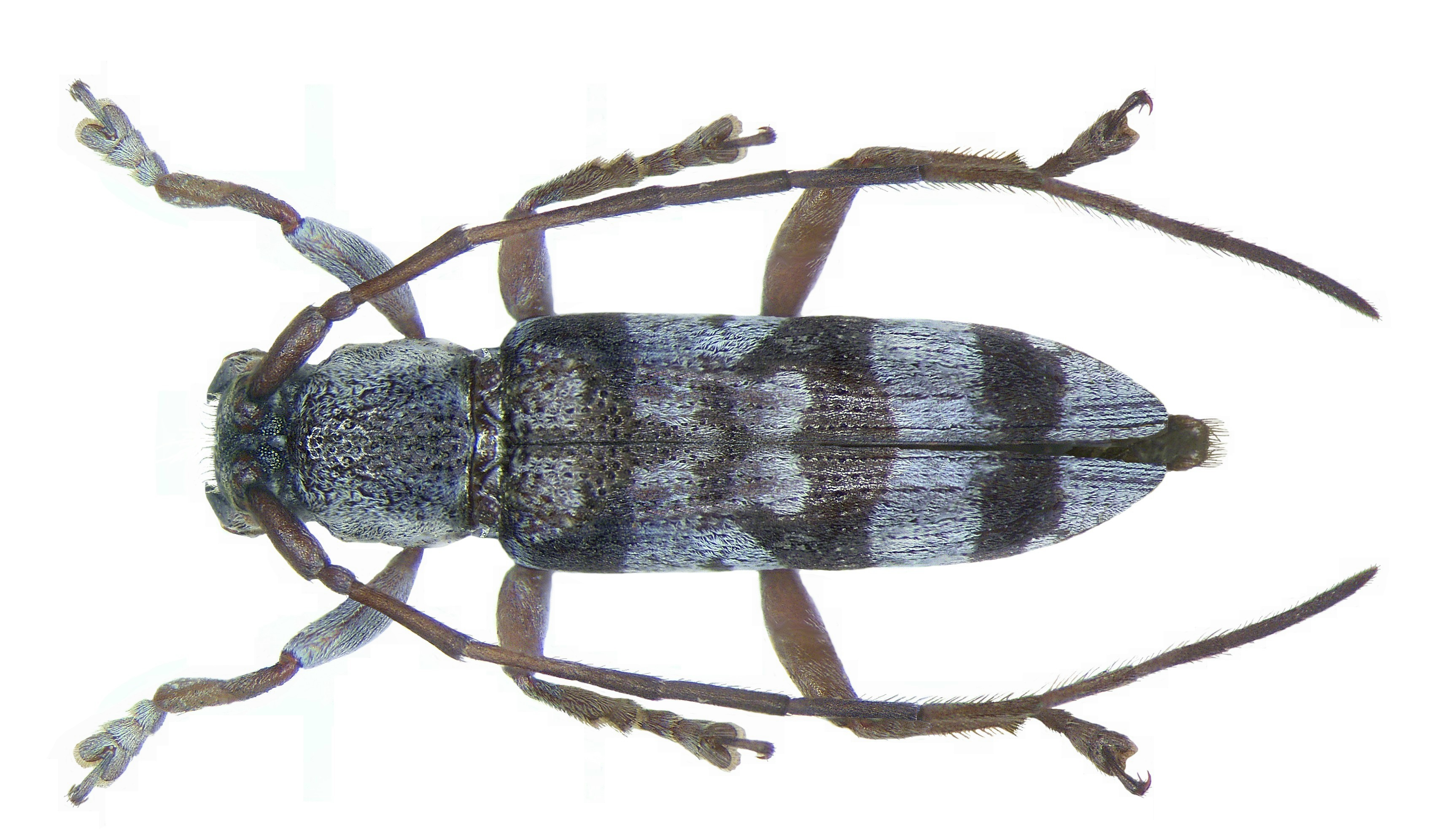

Scientific classification
- Domain: Eukaryota
- Kingdom: Animalia
- Phylum: Arthropoda
- Class: Insecta
- Order: Coleoptera
- Suborder: Polyphaga
- Infraorder: Cucujiformia
- Family: Cerambycidae
- Tribe: Apomecynini
- Genus: Bityle; Pascoe, 1865
- Species: B. bicolor

Binomial name
- Bityle bicolor Pascoe, 1865

= Bityle =

Genus of beetles

Bityle bicolor is a species of beetle in the family Cerambycidae and the only species in the genus Bityle. It was described by Francis Polkinghorne Pascoe in 1865.
