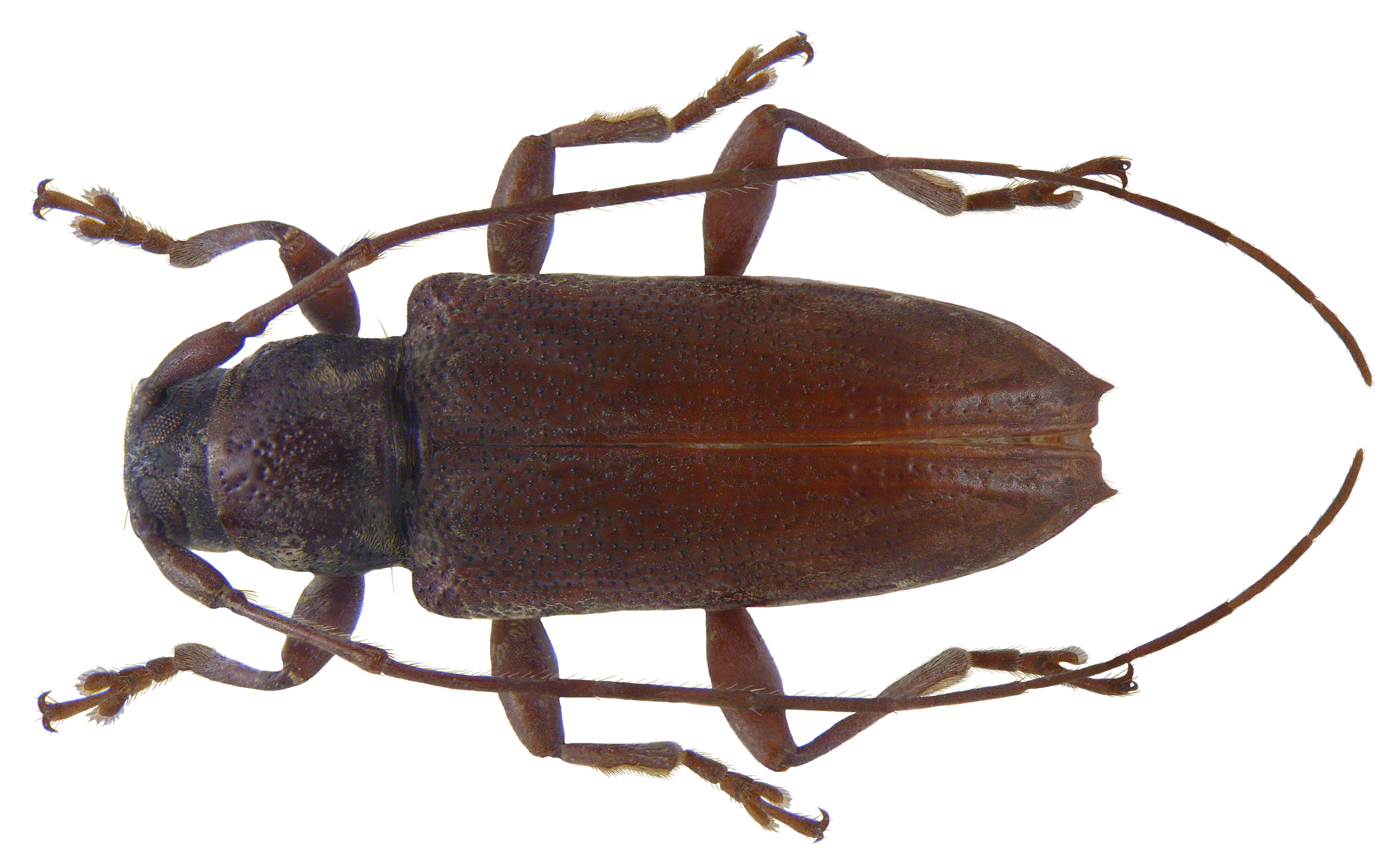

Scientific classification
- Domain: Eukaryota
- Kingdom: Animalia
- Phylum: Arthropoda
- Class: Insecta
- Order: Coleoptera
- Suborder: Polyphaga
- Infraorder: Cucujiformia
- Family: Cerambycidae
- Subfamily: Lamiinae
- Tribe: Apomecynini
- Genus: Atelais; Pascoe, 1867
- Species: A. illaesa

Binomial name
- Atelais illaesa Pascoe, 1867

= Atelais =

Genus of beetles

Atelais illaesa is a species of beetle in the family Cerambycidae, and the only species in the genus Atelais. It was described by Pascoe in 1867.
