= Iproca acuminata =

Scientific classification
- Domain: Eukaryota
- Kingdom: Animalia
- Phylum: Arthropoda
- Class: Insecta
- Order: Coleoptera
- Suborder: Polyphaga
- Infraorder: Cucujiformia
- Family: Cerambycidae
- Genus: Iproca
- Species: I. acuminata

Binomial name
- Iproca acuminata Gressitt, 1940

Species of beetle

Iproca acuminata is a species of beetle in the family Cerambycidae. It was described by Gressitt in 1940.
