= Poromecyna =

Scientific classification
- Domain: Eukaryota
- Kingdom: Animalia
- Phylum: Arthropoda
- Class: Insecta
- Order: Coleoptera
- Suborder: Polyphaga
- Infraorder: Cucujiformia
- Family: Cerambycidae
- Tribe: Apomecynini
- Genus: Poromecyna; Aurivillius, 1911
- Species: P. foveolata

Binomial name
- Poromecyna foveolata Aurivillius, 1911

Genus of beetles

Poromecyna is a monotypic beetle genus in the family Cerambycidae described by Per Olof Christopher Aurivillius in 1911. Its only species, Poromecyna foveolata, was described by the same author in the same year.
