= Iproca flavolineata =

Scientific classification
- Kingdom: Animalia
- Phylum: Arthropoda
- Class: Insecta
- Order: Coleoptera
- Suborder: Polyphaga
- Infraorder: Cucujiformia
- Family: Cerambycidae
- Genus: Iproca
- Species: I. flavolineata

Binomial name
- Iproca flavolineata Hayashi, 1971

Species of beetle

Iproca flavolineata is a species of beetle in the family Cerambycidae. It was described by Hayashi in 1971.
