= Asaperda stenostola =

Scientific classification
- Domain: Eukaryota
- Kingdom: Animalia
- Phylum: Arthropoda
- Class: Insecta
- Order: Coleoptera
- Suborder: Polyphaga
- Infraorder: Cucujiformia
- Family: Cerambycidae
- Genus: Asaperda
- Species: A. stenostola

Binomial name
- Asaperda stenostola Kraatz, 1873

Species of beetle

Asaperda stenostola is a species of beetle in the family Cerambycidae. It was described by Kraatz in 1873.
