= Aethiopia rufescens =

Scientific classification
- Domain: Eukaryota
- Kingdom: Animalia
- Phylum: Arthropoda
- Class: Insecta
- Order: Coleoptera
- Suborder: Polyphaga
- Infraorder: Cucujiformia
- Family: Cerambycidae
- Genus: Aethiopia
- Species: A. rufescens

Binomial name
- Aethiopia rufescens Aurivillius, 1913

Species of beetle

Aethiopia rufescens is a species of beetle in the family Cerambycidae. It was described by Per Olof Christopher Aurivillius in 1913.
