= Mynonoma integricollis =

Scientific classification
- Kingdom: Animalia
- Phylum: Arthropoda
- Class: Insecta
- Order: Coleoptera
- Suborder: Polyphaga
- Infraorder: Cucujiformia
- Family: Cerambycidae
- Genus: Mynonoma
- Species: M. integricollis

Binomial name
- Mynonoma integricollis (Breuning, 1942)

Species of beetle

Mynonoma integricollis is a species of beetle in the family Cerambycidae. It was described by Breuning in 1942.
