= Acanthosybra =

Scientific classification
- Kingdom: Animalia
- Phylum: Arthropoda
- Class: Insecta
- Order: Coleoptera
- Suborder: Polyphaga
- Infraorder: Cucujiformia
- Family: Cerambycidae
- Tribe: Apomecynini
- Genus: Acanthosybra; Breuning, 1939
- Species: A. lineolata

Binomial name
- Acanthosybra lineolata Breuning, 1939

Genus of beetle

Acanthosybra is a genus of beetles in the family Cerambycidae, containing a single species, Acanthosybra lineolata. It was described by Stephan von Breuning in 1939.

It is 6.5 mm long and 1.75 mm wide, and its type locality is Marosika, Madagascar.
