= Diamecyna =

Scientific classification
- Kingdom: Animalia
- Phylum: Arthropoda
- Class: Insecta
- Order: Coleoptera
- Suborder: Polyphaga
- Infraorder: Cucujiformia
- Family: Cerambycidae
- Tribe: Apomecynini
- Genus: Diamecyna; Breuning, 1939
- Species: D. setifera

Binomial name
- Diamecyna setifera Breuning, 1939

Genus of beetles

Diamecyna setifera is a species of beetle in the family Cerambycidae, and the only species in the genus Diamecyna. It was described by Stephan von Breuning in 1939.

Its type locality is Sumatra.
