= Lamprobityle mindanaoensis =

Scientific classification
- Kingdom: Animalia
- Phylum: Arthropoda
- Class: Insecta
- Order: Coleoptera
- Suborder: Polyphaga
- Infraorder: Cucujiformia
- Family: Cerambycidae
- Genus: Lamprobityle
- Species: L. mindanaoensis

Binomial name
- Lamprobityle mindanaoensis Barševskis & Jäger, 2014

Species of beetle

Lamprobityle mindanaoensis is a species of beetle in the family Cerambycidae. It was described by Barševskis and Jäger in 2014.
