= Cylindrosybra =

Scientific classification
- Kingdom: Animalia
- Phylum: Arthropoda
- Class: Insecta
- Order: Coleoptera
- Suborder: Polyphaga
- Infraorder: Cucujiformia
- Family: Cerambycidae
- Tribe: Apomecynini
- Genus: Cylindrosybra; Aurivillius, 1922
- Species: C. albomaculata

Binomial name
- Cylindrosybra albomaculata Aurivillius, 1922

Genus of beetles

Cylindrosybra is a monotypic beetle genus in the family Cerambycidae described by Per Olof Christopher Aurivillius in 1922. Its single species, Cylindrosybra albomaculata, was described by the same author in the same year.
