= Ceylanosybra =

Scientific classification
- Kingdom: Animalia
- Phylum: Arthropoda
- Class: Insecta
- Order: Coleoptera
- Suborder: Polyphaga
- Infraorder: Cucujiformia
- Family: Cerambycidae
- Tribe: Apomecynini
- Genus: Ceylanosybra; Breuning, 1975
- Species: C. baloghi

Binomial name
- Ceylanosybra baloghi Breuning, 1975

Genus of beetles

Ceylanosybra baloghi is a species of beetle in the family Cerambycidae, and the only species in the genus Ceylanosybra. It was described by Stephan von Breuning in 1975.
