= Ropicosybra albopubens =

Scientific classification
- Kingdom: Animalia
- Phylum: Arthropoda
- Class: Insecta
- Order: Coleoptera
- Suborder: Polyphaga
- Infraorder: Cucujiformia
- Family: Cerambycidae
- Genus: Ropicosybra
- Species: R. albopubens

Binomial name
- Ropicosybra albopubens (Pic, 1926)

Species of beetle

Ropicosybra albopubens is a species of beetle in the family Cerambycidae. It was described by Pic in 1926.
