= Lamprobityle azurea =

Scientific classification
- Kingdom: Animalia
- Phylum: Arthropoda
- Class: Insecta
- Order: Coleoptera
- Suborder: Polyphaga
- Infraorder: Cucujiformia
- Family: Cerambycidae
- Genus: Lamprobityle
- Species: L. azurea

Binomial name
- Lamprobityle azurea (Vives, 2012)

Species of beetle

Lamprobityle azurea is a species of beetle in the family Cerambycidae. It was described by Vives in 2012.
