= Mynonoma eunidioides =

Scientific classification
- Kingdom: Animalia
- Phylum: Arthropoda
- Class: Insecta
- Order: Coleoptera
- Suborder: Polyphaga
- Infraorder: Cucujiformia
- Family: Cerambycidae
- Genus: Mynonoma
- Species: M. eunidioides

Binomial name
- Mynonoma eunidioides Pascoe, 1865

Species of beetle

Mynonoma eunidioides is a species of beetle in the family Cerambycidae. It was described by Pascoe in 1865.
