= Mynonoma =

Scientific classification
- Kingdom: Animalia
- Phylum: Arthropoda
- Class: Insecta
- Order: Coleoptera
- Suborder: Polyphaga
- Infraorder: Cucujiformia
- Family: Cerambycidae
- Tribe: Apomecynini
- Genus: Mynonoma

Genus of beetles

Mynonoma is a genus of beetles in the family Cerambycidae, containing the following species:

- Mynonoma eunidioides Pascoe, 1865
- Mynonoma integricollis (Breuning, 1942)
