= Euteleuta venezuelensis =

Scientific classification
- Kingdom: Animalia
- Phylum: Arthropoda
- Class: Insecta
- Order: Coleoptera
- Suborder: Polyphaga
- Infraorder: Cucujiformia
- Family: Cerambycidae
- Genus: Euteleuta
- Species: E. venezuelensis

Binomial name
- Euteleuta venezuelensis Breuning, 1971

Species of beetle

Euteleuta venezuelensis is a species of beetle in the family Cerambycidae. It was described by Breuning in 1971.
