= Mimoopsis crassepuncta =

Scientific classification
- Kingdom: Animalia
- Phylum: Arthropoda
- Class: Insecta
- Order: Coleoptera
- Suborder: Polyphaga
- Infraorder: Cucujiformia
- Family: Cerambycidae
- Genus: Mimoopsis
- Species: M. crassepuncta

Binomial name
- Mimoopsis crassepuncta Breuning, 1942

Species of beetle

Mimoopsis crassepuncta is a species of beetle in the family Cerambycidae. It was described by Stephan von Breuning in 1942.
