= Aethiopia elongata =

Scientific classification
- Domain: Eukaryota
- Kingdom: Animalia
- Phylum: Arthropoda
- Class: Insecta
- Order: Coleoptera
- Suborder: Polyphaga
- Infraorder: Cucujiformia
- Family: Cerambycidae
- Genus: Aethiopia
- Species: A. elongata

Binomial name
- Aethiopia elongata Aurivillius, 1911

Species of beetle

Aethiopia elongata is a species of beetle in the family Cerambycidae. It was described by Per Olof Christopher Aurivillius in 1911.
