= Dyemus =

Scientific classification
- Kingdom: Animalia
- Phylum: Arthropoda
- Class: Insecta
- Order: Coleoptera
- Suborder: Polyphaga
- Infraorder: Cucujiformia
- Family: Cerambycidae
- Subfamily: Lamiinae
- Tribe: Apomecynini
- Genus: Dyemus; Pascoe, 1864

Genus of beetles

Dyemus is a genus of beetles in the family Cerambycidae, containing the following species:

- Dyemus basicristatus Breuning, 1938
- Dyemus puncticollis Pascoe, 1864
- Dyemus purpureopulcher (Gilmour, 1948)
- Dyemus undulatolineatus Breuning, 1938
