= Alluaudia insignis =

Scientific classification
- Kingdom: Animalia
- Phylum: Arthropoda
- Class: Insecta
- Order: Coleoptera
- Suborder: Polyphaga
- Infraorder: Cucujiformia
- Family: Cerambycidae
- Subfamily: Lamiinae
- Tribe: Apomecynini
- Genus: Alluaudia; Lameere, 1893
- Species: A. insignis

Binomial name
- Alluaudia insignis Lameere, 1893

Genus of beetles

For the spiny thicket plant, see Alluaudia.

Alluaudia insignis is a species of beetle in the family Cerambycidae, and the only species in the genus Alluaudia. It was described by Lameere in 1893.
