= Amblesthidopsis =

Scientific classification
- Kingdom: Animalia
- Phylum: Arthropoda
- Class: Insecta
- Order: Coleoptera
- Suborder: Polyphaga
- Infraorder: Cucujiformia
- Family: Cerambycidae
- Subfamily: Lamiinae
- Tribe: Apomecynini
- Genus: Amblesthidopsis; Aurivillius, 1921
- Species: A. areolata

Binomial name
- Amblesthidopsis areolata Aurivillius, 1921

Genus of beetles

Amblesthidopsis is a monotypic beetle genus in the family Cerambycidae described by Per Olof Christopher Aurivillius in 1921. Its only species, Amblesthidopsis areolata, was described by the same author in the same year.
