= Lamprobityle magnifica =

Scientific classification
- Kingdom: Animalia
- Phylum: Arthropoda
- Class: Insecta
- Order: Coleoptera
- Suborder: Polyphaga
- Infraorder: Cucujiformia
- Family: Cerambycidae
- Genus: Lamprobityle
- Species: L. magnifica

Binomial name
- Lamprobityle magnifica Heller, 1923

Species of beetle

Lamprobityle magnifica is a species of beetle in the family Cerambycidae. It was described by Heller in 1923.
