= Asaperda chongqingensis =

Scientific classification
- Domain: Eukaryota
- Kingdom: Animalia
- Phylum: Arthropoda
- Class: Insecta
- Order: Coleoptera
- Suborder: Polyphaga
- Infraorder: Cucujiformia
- Family: Cerambycidae
- Genus: Asaperda
- Species: A. chongqingensis

Binomial name
- Asaperda chongqingensis Chen & Chiang, 1993

Species of beetle

Asaperda chongqingensis is a species of beetle in the family Cerambycidae. It was described by Chen and Chiang in 1993.
