= Lamprobityle =

Scientific classification
- Kingdom: Animalia
- Phylum: Arthropoda
- Class: Insecta
- Order: Coleoptera
- Suborder: Polyphaga
- Infraorder: Cucujiformia
- Family: Cerambycidae
- Subfamily: Lamiinae
- Tribe: Apomecynini
- Genus: Lamprobityle; Heller, 1923

Genus of beetles

Lamprobityle is a genus of beetles in the family Cerambycidae, containing the following species:

- Lamprobityle azurea (Vives, 2012)
- Lamprobityle conspersa (Aurivillius, 1927)
- Lamprobityle fasciata (Vives, 2012)
- Lamprobityle magnifica Heller, 1923
- Lamprobityle mariae (Vives, 2009)
- Lamprobityle mindanaoensis Barševskis & Jäger, 2014
- Lamprobityle rugulata (Vives, 2012)
