= Catuaba sanguinolenta =

Scientific classification
- Domain: Eukaryota
- Kingdom: Animalia
- Phylum: Arthropoda
- Class: Insecta
- Order: Coleoptera
- Suborder: Polyphaga
- Infraorder: Cucujiformia
- Family: Cerambycidae
- Subfamily: Lamiinae
- Tribe: Apomecynini
- Genus: Catuaba; Martins & Galileo, 2003
- Species: C. sanguinolenta

Binomial name
- Catuaba sanguinolenta Martins & Galileo, 2003

Synonyms
- Catuaba sanguinoloenta

Genus of beetles

Catuaba is a genus of long-horned beetles in the family Cerambycidae. This genus has a single species, Catuaba sanguinolenta, found in Brazil.
