= Microplocia puncticollis =

Scientific classification
- Kingdom: Animalia
- Phylum: Arthropoda
- Class: Insecta
- Order: Coleoptera
- Suborder: Polyphaga
- Infraorder: Cucujiformia
- Family: Cerambycidae
- Genus: Microplocia
- Species: M. puncticollis

Binomial name
- Microplocia puncticollis Heller, 1924

Species of beetle

Microplocia puncticollis is a species of beetle in the family Cerambycidae. It was described by Heller in 1924.
