= Asaperda tenuicornis =

Scientific classification
- Kingdom: Animalia
- Phylum: Arthropoda
- Class: Insecta
- Order: Coleoptera
- Suborder: Polyphaga
- Infraorder: Cucujiformia
- Family: Cerambycidae
- Genus: Asaperda
- Species: A. tenuicornis

Binomial name
- Asaperda tenuicornis Komiya, 1984

Species of beetle

Asaperda tenuicornis is a species of beetle in the family Cerambycidae. It was described by Komiya in 1984.
