= Bybe =

Scientific classification
- Domain: Eukaryota
- Kingdom: Animalia
- Phylum: Arthropoda
- Class: Insecta
- Order: Coleoptera
- Suborder: Polyphaga
- Infraorder: Cucujiformia
- Family: Cerambycidae
- Tribe: Apomecynini
- Genus: Bybe
- Species: B. parmenoides

Binomial name
- Bybe parmenoides Pascoe, 1866

Genus of beetles

Bybe parmenoides is a species of beetle in the family Cerambycidae, and the only species in the genus Bybe. It was described by Pascoe in 1866.
