= Metamecyna =

Scientific classification
- Kingdom: Animalia
- Phylum: Arthropoda
- Class: Insecta
- Order: Coleoptera
- Suborder: Polyphaga
- Infraorder: Cucujiformia
- Family: Cerambycidae
- Tribe: Apomecynini
- Genus: Metamecyna; Breuning, 1939

Type species
- Metamecyna uniformis Breuning, 1939

Genus of beetles

Metamecyna is a genus of beetles in the family Cerambycidae, containing the following species:

- Metamecyna flavoapicalis Breuning, 1969
- Metamecyna uniformis Breuning, 1939
