= Ancornallis =

Scientific classification
- Kingdom: Animalia
- Phylum: Arthropoda
- Clade: Pancrustacea
- Class: Insecta
- Order: Coleoptera
- Suborder: Polyphaga
- Infraorder: Cucujiformia
- Family: Cerambycidae
- Subfamily: Lamiinae
- Tribe: Apomecynini
- Genus: Ancornallis
- Species: A. cristatus

Binomial name
- Ancornallis cristatus Fisher, 1935

Species of beetle in the family Cerambycidae

Ancornallis cristatus is a species of beetle in the family Cerambycidae. It is the only species in the genus Ancornallis. The species was described by Warren Samuel Fisher in 1935. It is found on the island of Borneo.
