= Asaperda bicostata =

Scientific classification
- Kingdom: Animalia
- Phylum: Arthropoda
- Class: Insecta
- Order: Coleoptera
- Suborder: Polyphaga
- Infraorder: Cucujiformia
- Family: Cerambycidae
- Genus: Asaperda
- Species: A. bicostata

Binomial name
- Asaperda bicostata Hayashi, 1956

Species of beetle

Asaperda bicostata is a species of beetle in the family Cerambycidae. It was described by Hayashi in 1956.
