= Ropicosybra =

Scientific classification
- Kingdom: Animalia
- Phylum: Arthropoda
- Class: Insecta
- Order: Coleoptera
- Suborder: Polyphaga
- Infraorder: Cucujiformia
- Family: Cerambycidae
- Subfamily: Lamiinae
- Tribe: Apomecynini
- Genus: Ropicosybra; Pic, 1945

Genus of beetles

Ropicosybra is a genus of beetles in the family Cerambycidae, containing the following species:

- Ropicosybra albopubens (Pic, 1926)
- Ropicosybra coomani (Pic, 1926)
- Ropicosybra multipunctata (Pic, 1927)
- Ropicosybra schurmanni Breuning, 1983
- Ropicosybra spinipennis (Pic, 1926)
