= Iproca ishigakiana =

Scientific classification
- Kingdom: Animalia
- Phylum: Arthropoda
- Class: Insecta
- Order: Coleoptera
- Suborder: Polyphaga
- Infraorder: Cucujiformia
- Family: Cerambycidae
- Genus: Iproca
- Species: I. ishigakiana

Binomial name
- Iproca ishigakiana Breuning & Ohbayashi, 1966

Species of beetle

Iproca ishigakiana is a species of beetle in the family Cerambycidae. It was described by Stephan von Breuning and Ohbayashi in 1966.
