= Mimoopsis fuscoapicatus =

Scientific classification
- Kingdom: Animalia
- Phylum: Arthropoda
- Class: Insecta
- Order: Coleoptera
- Suborder: Polyphaga
- Infraorder: Cucujiformia
- Family: Cerambycidae
- Genus: Mimoopsis
- Species: M. fuscoapicatus

Binomial name
- Mimoopsis fuscoapicatus (Fairmaire, 1879)

Species of beetle

Mimoopsis fuscoapicatus is a species of beetle in the family Cerambycidae. It was described by Fairmaire in 1879.
