= Novorondonia =

Scientific classification
- Kingdom: Animalia
- Phylum: Arthropoda
- Class: Insecta
- Order: Coleoptera
- Suborder: Polyphaga
- Infraorder: Cucujiformia
- Family: Cerambycidae
- Tribe: Apomecynini
- Genus: Novorondonia; Özdikmen, 2008
- Species: N. ropicoides

Binomial name
- Novorondonia ropicoides (Breuning, 1962)

Synonyms
- Rondonia ropicoides Breuning, 1962

Genus of beetles

Novorondonia ropicoides is a species of beetle in the family Cerambycidae, and the only species in the genus Novorondonia. It was described by Breuning in 1962.
