= Eremosybra albosignata =

Scientific classification
- Kingdom: Animalia
- Phylum: Arthropoda
- Class: Insecta
- Order: Coleoptera
- Suborder: Polyphaga
- Infraorder: Cucujiformia
- Family: Cerambycidae
- Genus: Eremosybra
- Species: E. albosignata

Binomial name
- Eremosybra albosignata Breuning, 1960

Species of beetle

Eremosybra albosignata is a species of beetles in the family Cerambycidae.
