= Eremosybra =

Scientific classification
- Kingdom: Animalia
- Phylum: Arthropoda
- Class: Insecta
- Order: Coleoptera
- Suborder: Polyphaga
- Infraorder: Cucujiformia
- Family: Cerambycidae
- Tribe: Apomecynini
- Genus: Eremosybra

Genus of beetles

Eremosybra is a genus of beetles in the family Cerambycidae, containing the following species:

- Eremosybra albosignata Breuning, 1960
- Eremosybra flavolineata Breuning, 1942
- Eremosybra flavolineatoides Breuning, 1964
