= Irundiaba =

Scientific classification
- Kingdom: Animalia
- Phylum: Arthropoda
- Class: Insecta
- Order: Coleoptera
- Suborder: Polyphaga
- Infraorder: Cucujiformia
- Family: Cerambycidae
- Tribe: Apomecynini
- Genus: Irundiaba; Martins & Galileo, 2008
- Species: I. waorani

Binomial name
- Irundiaba waorani Martins & Galileo, 2008

Genus of beetles

Irundiaba waorani is a species of beetle in the family Cerambycidae, and the only species in the genus Irundiaba. It was described by Martins & Galileo in 2008.
