= Iproca pedongensis =

Scientific classification
- Kingdom: Animalia
- Phylum: Arthropoda
- Class: Insecta
- Order: Coleoptera
- Suborder: Polyphaga
- Infraorder: Cucujiformia
- Family: Cerambycidae
- Genus: Iproca
- Species: I. pedongensis

Binomial name
- Iproca pedongensis Breuning, 1969

Species of beetle

Iproca pedongensis is a species of beetle in the family Cerambycidae. It was described by Breuning in 1969.
