= Aethiopia (beetle) =

Scientific classification
- Domain: Eukaryota
- Kingdom: Animalia
- Phylum: Arthropoda
- Class: Insecta
- Order: Coleoptera
- Suborder: Polyphaga
- Infraorder: Cucujiformia
- Family: Cerambycidae
- Tribe: Apomecynini
- Genus: Aethiopia; Aurivillius, 1911

Genus of beetles

Aethiopia is a genus of beetles in the family Cerambycidae, containing the following species:

- Aethiopia elongata Aurivillius, 1911
- Aethiopia lesnei Breuning, 1948
- Aethiopia lineolata Breuning, 1939
- Aethiopia paratanganjicae Breuning, 1971
- Aethiopia rufescens Aurivillius, 1913
- Aethiopia tanganjicae Breuning, 1964
