= Pseudaelara =

Scientific classification
- Domain: Eukaryota
- Kingdom: Animalia
- Phylum: Arthropoda
- Class: Insecta
- Order: Coleoptera
- Suborder: Polyphaga
- Infraorder: Cucujiformia
- Family: Cerambycidae
- Tribe: Apomecynini
- Genus: Pseudaelara
- Species: P. sellaemontis

Binomial name
- Pseudaelara sellaemontis Heller, 1912

Genus of beetles

Pseudaelara sellaemontis is a species of beetle in the family Cerambycidae, and the only species in the genus Pseudaelara. It was described by Heller in 1912.
