= Microplocia sybroides =

Scientific classification
- Kingdom: Animalia
- Phylum: Arthropoda
- Class: Insecta
- Order: Coleoptera
- Suborder: Polyphaga
- Infraorder: Cucujiformia
- Family: Cerambycidae
- Genus: Microplocia
- Species: M. sybroides

Binomial name
- Microplocia sybroides Breuning, 1942

Species of beetle

Microplocia sybroides is a species of beetle in the family Cerambycidae. It was described by Breuning in 1942.
