= Albasor =

Scientific classification
- Kingdom: Animalia
- Phylum: Arthropoda
- Clade: Pancrustacea
- Class: Insecta
- Order: Coleoptera
- Suborder: Polyphaga
- Infraorder: Cucujiformia
- Family: Cerambycidae
- Subfamily: Lamiinae
- Tribe: Apomecynini
- Genus: Albasor; Vlasák & Santos-Silva, 2025
- Species: A. formicosus

Binomial name
- Albasor formicosus Vlasák & Santos-Silva, 2025

Genus of beetles

Albasor is a genus of beetle of the family Cerambycidae. It is monotypic, being represented by the single species, Albasor formicosus, which is found in Ecuador.

== Description ==
Adults reach a length of about 7.85 mm (0.309 in). The head capsule is head capsule is brown on the frons and the dorsal area between the antennal tubercles and the posterior margin of the upper eye lobes, while it is dark brown on the remaining surface of the vertex and entire area behind the eyes, reddish brown on the anterior area of the ventral surface, dark yellowish brown on the remaining ventral surface, orangish brown on the wide central area of the genae and brown on the remaining genal surface, and dark brown on the antennal tubercles except for the orangish apex. The pronotum is brown, but more reddish‑brown on some areas and with a large omega‑shaped dark‑brown macula. The scutellum is reddish brown, except for the blackish lateroanterior areas. The elytra are reddish brown on the dorsal surface close to the anterior margin and dark brown (almost blackish) from the area close to the epipleural margin to the dorsal area on the anterior sixth. There is a V‑shaped blackish macula on the area of the centrobasal crest and an oblique dark‑brown band from the V‑shaped blackish band to near the suture on the anterior quarter.

== Etymology ==
The species name is derived from Latin formica (meaning ant) and osus (meaning full of) and refers to the fact that the holotype was damaged by tiny ants that entered its pupal cell.
