= Euteleuta laticauda =

Scientific classification
- Kingdom: Animalia
- Phylum: Arthropoda
- Class: Insecta
- Order: Coleoptera
- Suborder: Polyphaga
- Infraorder: Cucujiformia
- Family: Cerambycidae
- Genus: Euteleuta
- Species: E. laticauda

Binomial name
- Euteleuta laticauda Bates, 1885

Species of beetle

Euteleuta laticauda is a species of beetle in the family Cerambycidae. It was described by Bates in 1885.
