= Paramblesthidopsis =

Scientific classification
- Kingdom: Animalia
- Phylum: Arthropoda
- Class: Insecta
- Order: Coleoptera
- Suborder: Polyphaga
- Infraorder: Cucujiformia
- Family: Cerambycidae
- Subfamily: Lamiinae
- Tribe: Apomecynini
- Genus: Paramblesthidopsis
- Species: P. ochreosignata

Binomial name
- Paramblesthidopsis ochreosignata Breuning, 1981

Genus of beetles

Paramblesthidopsis ochreosignata is a species of beetle in the family Cerambycidae, and the only species in the genus Paramblesthidopsis. It is found in the Republic of the Congo. It was described by Stephan von Breuning in 1981.
