= Xylosybra =

Scientific classification
- Kingdom: Animalia
- Phylum: Arthropoda
- Class: Insecta
- Order: Coleoptera
- Suborder: Polyphaga
- Infraorder: Cucujiformia
- Family: Cerambycidae
- Tribe: Apomecynini
- Genus: Xylosybra; Breuning, 1939
- Species: X. fasciculosa

Binomial name
- Xylosybra fasciculosa Breuning, 1939

Genus of beetles

Xylosybra fasciculosa is a species of beetle in the family Cerambycidae, and the only species in the genus Xylosybra. It was described by Stephan von Breuning in 1939.

It's 14½ mm long and 4⅓ mm wide, and its type locality is Sarawak, Borneo.
