= Mimoopsis =

Scientific classification
- Kingdom: Animalia
- Phylum: Arthropoda
- Class: Insecta
- Order: Coleoptera
- Suborder: Polyphaga
- Infraorder: Cucujiformia
- Family: Cerambycidae
- Tribe: Apomecynini
- Genus: Mimoopsis

Genus of beetles

Mimoopsis is a genus of beetles in the family Cerambycidae, containing the following species:

- Mimoopsis crassepuncta Breuning, 1942
- Mimoopsis fuscoapicatus (Fairmaire, 1879)
- Mimoopsis insularis (Breuning, 1939)
