= Trichomecyna =

Scientific classification
- Kingdom: Animalia
- Phylum: Arthropoda
- Class: Insecta
- Order: Coleoptera
- Suborder: Polyphaga
- Infraorder: Cucujiformia
- Family: Cerambycidae
- Tribe: Apomecynini
- Genus: Trichomecyna; Breuning, 1939
- Species: T. fuscovittata

Binomial name
- Trichomecyna fuscovittata Breuning, 1939

Genus of beetles

Trichomecyna fuscovittata is a species of beetle in the family Cerambycidae, and the only species in the genus Trichomecyna. It was described by Breuning in 1939.

It's 13 mm long and 3.5 mm wide, and its type locality is the Thua River, Kenya.
