= Pseudokamikiria =

Scientific classification
- Kingdom: Animalia
- Phylum: Arthropoda
- Class: Insecta
- Order: Coleoptera
- Suborder: Polyphaga
- Infraorder: Cucujiformia
- Family: Cerambycidae
- Subfamily: Lamiinae
- Tribe: Apomecynini
- Genus: Pseudokamikiria; Breuning, 1964
- Species: P. klapperichi

Binomial name
- Pseudokamikiria klapperichi (Tippmann, 1955)

Synonyms
- Kamikiria klapperichi Tippmann, 1955

Species of beetle

Pseudokamikiria klapperichi is a species of beetle in the family Cerambycidae, and the sole member of the genus Pseudokamikiria. It was described by Tippmann in 1955. It is known from China.
