= Rhadia =

Scientific classification
- Domain: Eukaryota
- Kingdom: Animalia
- Phylum: Arthropoda
- Class: Insecta
- Order: Coleoptera
- Suborder: Polyphaga
- Infraorder: Cucujiformia
- Family: Cerambycidae
- Subfamily: Lamiinae
- Tribe: Apomecynini
- Genus: Rhadia; Pascoe, 1867
- Species: R. pusio

Binomial name
- Rhadia pusio Pascoe, 1867

Genus of beetles

Rhadia is a genus of longhorned beetles in the family Cerambycidae. This genus has a single species, Rhadia pusio, found in Papua New Guinea.
