= Sarillus =

Scientific classification
- Kingdom: Animalia
- Phylum: Arthropoda
- Class: Insecta
- Order: Coleoptera
- Suborder: Polyphaga
- Infraorder: Cucujiformia
- Family: Cerambycidae
- Genus: Sarillus
- Species: S. pygmaeus

Binomial name
- Sarillus pygmaeus Bates, 1885

Genus of beetles

Sarillus pygmaeus is a species of beetle in the family Cerambycidae, and the only species in the genus Sarillus. It was described by Henry Walter Bates in 1885.
