= Dymascus =

Scientific classification
- Kingdom: Animalia
- Phylum: Arthropoda
- Class: Insecta
- Order: Coleoptera
- Suborder: Polyphaga
- Infraorder: Cucujiformia
- Family: Cerambycidae
- Genus: Dymascus
- Species: D. porosus

Binomial name
- Dymascus porosus Pascoe, 1865

Genus of beetles

Dymascus porosus is a species of beetle in the family Cerambycidae, and the only species in the genus Dymascus. It was described by Pascoe in 1865.
