= Ametacyna =

Scientific classification
- Kingdom: Animalia
- Phylum: Arthropoda
- Class: Insecta
- Order: Coleoptera
- Suborder: Polyphaga
- Infraorder: Cucujiformia
- Family: Cerambycidae
- Genus: Ametacyna
- Species: A. holzschuhi

Binomial name
- Ametacyna holzschuhi Hüdepohl, 1995

Genus of beetles

Ametacyna holzschuhi is a species of beetle in the family Cerambycidae, and the only species in the genus Ametacyna. It was described by Hüdepohl in 1995.
