= Falsoparmena =

Scientific classification
- Kingdom: Animalia
- Phylum: Arthropoda
- Class: Insecta
- Order: Coleoptera
- Suborder: Polyphaga
- Infraorder: Cucujiformia
- Family: Cerambycidae
- Genus: Falsoparmena
- Species: F. malaccensis

Binomial name
- Falsoparmena malaccensis Breuning, 1943

Genus of beetles

Falsoparmena malaccensis is a species of beetle in the family Cerambycidae, and the only species in the genus Falsoparmena. It was described by Breuning in 1943.
