= Parastathmodera =

Scientific classification
- Kingdom: Animalia
- Phylum: Arthropoda
- Class: Insecta
- Order: Coleoptera
- Suborder: Polyphaga
- Infraorder: Cucujiformia
- Family: Cerambycidae
- Genus: Parastathmodera
- Species: P. bothai

Binomial name
- Parastathmodera bothai Breuning, 1981

Genus of beetles

Parastathmodera bothai is a species of beetle in the family Cerambycidae, and the only species in the genus Parastathmodera. It was described by Breuning in 1981.
