= Pareunidia =

Scientific classification
- Kingdom: Animalia
- Phylum: Arthropoda
- Class: Insecta
- Order: Coleoptera
- Suborder: Polyphaga
- Infraorder: Cucujiformia
- Family: Cerambycidae
- Genus: Pareunidia
- Species: P. griseovittata

Binomial name
- Pareunidia griseovittata Breuning, 1967

Genus of beetles

Pareunidia griseovittata is a species of beetle in the family Cerambycidae, and the only species in the genus Pareunidia. It was described by Breuning in 1967.
