= Tuberculosybra =

Scientific classification
- Kingdom: Animalia
- Phylum: Arthropoda
- Class: Insecta
- Order: Coleoptera
- Suborder: Polyphaga
- Infraorder: Cucujiformia
- Family: Cerambycidae
- Genus: Tuberculosybra
- Species: T. tuberculata

Binomial name
- Tuberculosybra tuberculata Breuning, 1948

Genus of beetles

Tuberculosybra tuberculata is a species of beetle in the family Cerambycidae, and the only species in the genus Tuberculosybra. It was described by Breuning in 1948.
