= Subinermexocentrus =

Scientific classification
- Kingdom: Animalia
- Phylum: Arthropoda
- Class: Insecta
- Order: Coleoptera
- Suborder: Polyphaga
- Infraorder: Cucujiformia
- Family: Cerambycidae
- Genus: Subinermexocentrus
- Species: S. allardi

Binomial name
- Subinermexocentrus allardi Breuning, 1972

Genus of beetles

Subinermexocentrus allardi is a species of beetle in the family Cerambycidae, and the only species in the genus Subinermexocentrus, as was described by Stephan von Breuning in 1972.
