= Eremophanes =

Scientific classification
- Kingdom: Animalia
- Phylum: Arthropoda
- Class: Insecta
- Order: Coleoptera
- Suborder: Polyphaga
- Infraorder: Cucujiformia
- Family: Cerambycidae
- Genus: Eremophanes
- Species: E. annulicornis

Binomial name
- Eremophanes annulicornis Kolbe, 1894

Genus of beetles

Eremophanes annulicornis is a species of beetle in the family Cerambycidae, and the only species in the genus Eremophanes. It was described by Kolbe in 1894.
