= Craspedoderus =

Scientific classification
- Kingdom: Animalia
- Phylum: Arthropoda
- Class: Insecta
- Order: Coleoptera
- Suborder: Polyphaga
- Infraorder: Cucujiformia
- Family: Cerambycidae
- Genus: Craspedoderus
- Species: C. dilaticollis

Binomial name
- Craspedoderus dilaticollis Thomson, 1864

Genus of beetles

Craspedoderus dilaticollis is a species of beetle in the family Cerambycidae, and the only species in the genus Craspedoderus. It was described by Thomson in 1864.
