= Mimassinia =

Scientific classification
- Kingdom: Animalia
- Phylum: Arthropoda
- Class: Insecta
- Order: Coleoptera
- Suborder: Polyphaga
- Infraorder: Cucujiformia
- Family: Cerambycidae
- Genus: Mimassinia
- Species: M. orientalis

Binomial name
- Mimassinia orientalis Breuning, 1965

Genus of beetles

Mimassinia orientalis is a species of beetle in the family Cerambycidae, and the only species in the genus Mimassinia. It was described by Breuning in 1965.
