= Metamecynopsis =

Scientific classification
- Kingdom: Animalia
- Phylum: Arthropoda
- Class: Insecta
- Order: Coleoptera
- Suborder: Polyphaga
- Infraorder: Cucujiformia
- Family: Cerambycidae
- Genus: Metamecynopsis
- Species: M. duodecimguttata

Binomial name
- Metamecynopsis duodecimguttata Hüdepohl, 1995

Genus of beetles

Metamecynopsis duodecimguttata is a species of beetle in the family Cerambycidae, and the only species in the genus Metamecynopsis. It was described by Hüdepohl in 1995.
