= Sympergoides =

Scientific classification
- Kingdom: Animalia
- Phylum: Arthropoda
- Class: Insecta
- Order: Coleoptera
- Suborder: Polyphaga
- Infraorder: Cucujiformia
- Family: Cerambycidae
- Genus: Sympergoides
- Species: S. nasutus

Binomial name
- Sympergoides nasutus Lane, 1970

Genus of beetles

Sympergoides nasutus is a species of beetle in the family Cerambycidae, and the only species in the genus Sympergoides. It was described by Lane in 1970.
