= Paracornallis =

Scientific classification
- Kingdom: Animalia
- Phylum: Arthropoda
- Class: Insecta
- Order: Coleoptera
- Suborder: Polyphaga
- Infraorder: Cucujiformia
- Family: Cerambycidae
- Genus: Paracornallis
- Species: P. multituberculata

Binomial name
- Paracornallis multituberculata Breuning, 1969

Genus of beetles

Paracornallis multituberculata is a species of beetle in the family Cerambycidae, and the only species in the genus Paracornallis. It was described by Stephan von Breuning in 1969.
