= Falsomoechotypa =

Scientific classification
- Kingdom: Animalia
- Phylum: Arthropoda
- Class: Insecta
- Order: Coleoptera
- Suborder: Polyphaga
- Infraorder: Cucujiformia
- Family: Cerambycidae
- Genus: Falsomoechotypa
- Species: F. kaszabi

Binomial name
- Falsomoechotypa kaszabi Breuning, 1954

Genus of beetles

Falsomoechotypa kaszabi is a species of beetle in the family Cerambycidae, and the only species in the genus Falsomoechotypa. It was described by Breuning in 1954.
