= Nicomioides =

Scientific classification
- Kingdom: Animalia
- Phylum: Arthropoda
- Class: Insecta
- Order: Coleoptera
- Suborder: Polyphaga
- Infraorder: Cucujiformia
- Family: Cerambycidae
- Genus: Nicomioides
- Species: N. larvatus

Binomial name
- Nicomioides larvatus (Pascoe, 1878)

Genus of beetles

Nicomioides larvatus is a species of beetle in the family Cerambycidae, and the only species in the genus Nicomioides. It was described by Pascoe in 1878.
