= Diasybra =

Scientific classification
- Kingdom: Animalia
- Phylum: Arthropoda
- Class: Insecta
- Order: Coleoptera
- Suborder: Polyphaga
- Infraorder: Cucujiformia
- Family: Cerambycidae
- Genus: Diasybra
- Species: D. ochreobasalis

Binomial name
- Diasybra ochreobasalis Breuning, 1959

Genus of beetles

Diasybra ochreobasalis is a species of beetle in the family Cerambycidae, and the only species in the genus Diasybra. It was described by Breuning in 1959.
