= Typophaula =

Scientific classification
- Kingdom: Animalia
- Phylum: Arthropoda
- Class: Insecta
- Order: Coleoptera
- Suborder: Polyphaga
- Infraorder: Cucujiformia
- Family: Cerambycidae
- Genus: Typophaula
- Species: T. melancholica

Binomial name
- Typophaula melancholica Thomson, 1868

Genus of beetles

Typophaula melancholica is a species of beetle in the family Cerambycidae, and the only species in the genus Typophaula. It was described by Thomson in 1868.
