= Cristepilysta =

Scientific classification
- Kingdom: Animalia
- Phylum: Arthropoda
- Class: Insecta
- Order: Coleoptera
- Suborder: Polyphaga
- Infraorder: Cucujiformia
- Family: Cerambycidae
- Genus: Cristepilysta
- Species: C. cristipennis

Binomial name
- Cristepilysta cristipennis Breuning, 1951

Genus of beetles

Cristepilysta cristipennis is a species of beetle in the family Cerambycidae, and the only species in the genus Cristepilysta. It was described by Breuning in 1951.
