= Tucumaniella =

Scientific classification
- Kingdom: Animalia
- Phylum: Arthropoda
- Class: Insecta
- Order: Coleoptera
- Suborder: Polyphaga
- Infraorder: Cucujiformia
- Family: Cerambycidae
- Genus: Tucumaniella
- Species: T. brevipes

Binomial name
- Tucumaniella brevipes Breuning, 1943

Genus of beetles

Tucumaniella brevipes is a species of beetle in the family Cerambycidae, and the only species in the genus Tucumaniella. It was described by Breuning in 1943.
