= Paradyemus =

Scientific classification
- Kingdom: Animalia
- Phylum: Arthropoda
- Class: Insecta
- Order: Coleoptera
- Suborder: Polyphaga
- Infraorder: Cucujiformia
- Family: Cerambycidae
- Genus: Paradyemus
- Species: P. nodicollis

Binomial name
- Paradyemus nodicollis Breuning, 1951

Genus of beetles

Paradyemus nodicollis is a species of beetle in the family Cerambycidae, and the only species in the genus Paradyemus. It was described by Breuning in 1951.
