= Palausybra =

Scientific classification
- Kingdom: Animalia
- Phylum: Arthropoda
- Class: Insecta
- Order: Coleoptera
- Suborder: Polyphaga
- Infraorder: Cucujiformia
- Family: Cerambycidae
- Genus: Palausybra
- Species: P. vestigialis

Binomial name
- Palausybra vestigialis Gressitt, 1956

Genus of beetles

Palausybra vestigialis is a species of beetle in the family Cerambycidae, and the only species in the genus Palausybra. It was described by Gressitt in 1956.
