= Taiwanajinga =

Scientific classification
- Kingdom: Animalia
- Phylum: Arthropoda
- Class: Insecta
- Order: Coleoptera
- Suborder: Polyphaga
- Infraorder: Cucujiformia
- Family: Cerambycidae
- Genus: Taiwanajinga
- Species: T. albofasciata

Binomial name
- Taiwanajinga albofasciata Hayashi, 1978

Genus of beetles

Taiwanajinga albofasciata is a species of beetle in the family Cerambycidae, and the only species in the genus Taiwanajinga. It was described by Hayashi in 1978.
