= Stenocoptoides =

Scientific classification
- Kingdom: Animalia
- Phylum: Arthropoda
- Class: Insecta
- Order: Coleoptera
- Suborder: Polyphaga
- Infraorder: Cucujiformia
- Family: Cerambycidae
- Genus: Stenocoptoides
- Species: S. ciliatus

Binomial name
- Stenocoptoides ciliatus Breuning, 1942

Genus of beetles

Stenocoptoides ciliatus is a species of beetle in the family Cerambycidae, and the only species in the genus Stenocoptoides. It was described by Breuning in 1942.
