= Pariproca =

Scientific classification
- Kingdom: Animalia
- Phylum: Arthropoda
- Class: Insecta
- Order: Coleoptera
- Suborder: Polyphaga
- Infraorder: Cucujiformia
- Family: Cerambycidae
- Genus: Pariproca
- Species: P. spinipennis

Binomial name
- Pariproca spinipennis Breuning, 1968

Genus of beetles

Pariproca spinipennis is a species of beetle in the family Cerambycidae, and the only species in the genus Pariproca. It was described by Breuning in 1968.
