= Elongatosybra =

Scientific classification
- Kingdom: Animalia
- Phylum: Arthropoda
- Class: Insecta
- Order: Coleoptera
- Suborder: Polyphaga
- Infraorder: Cucujiformia
- Family: Cerambycidae
- Genus: Elongatosybra
- Species: E. flava

Binomial name
- Elongatosybra flava Breuning, 1961

Genus of beetles

Elongatosybra flava is a species of beetle in the family Cerambycidae, and the only species in the genus Elongatosybra. It was described by Breuning in 1961.
