= Parabybe =

Scientific classification
- Kingdom: Animalia
- Phylum: Arthropoda
- Class: Insecta
- Order: Coleoptera
- Suborder: Polyphaga
- Infraorder: Cucujiformia
- Family: Cerambycidae
- Genus: Parabybe
- Species: P. subfoveolata

Binomial name
- Parabybe subfoveolata Schwarzer, 1930

Genus of beetles

Parabybe subfoveolata is a species of beetle in the family Cerambycidae, and the only species in the genus Parabybe. It was described by Schwarzer in 1930.
