= Ropicapomecyna =

Scientific classification
- Kingdom: Animalia
- Phylum: Arthropoda
- Class: Insecta
- Order: Coleoptera
- Suborder: Polyphaga
- Infraorder: Cucujiformia
- Family: Cerambycidae
- Genus: Ropicapomecyna
- Species: R. fairmairei

Binomial name
- Ropicapomecyna fairmairei Breuning, 1957

Genus of beetles

Ropicapomecyna fairmairei is a species of beetle in the family Cerambycidae, and the only species in the genus Ropicapomecyna. It was described by Stephan von Breuning in 1957.
