= Parapomecyna =

Scientific classification
- Kingdom: Animalia
- Phylum: Arthropoda
- Class: Insecta
- Order: Coleoptera
- Suborder: Polyphaga
- Infraorder: Cucujiformia
- Family: Cerambycidae
- Genus: Parapomecyna
- Species: P. flavomaculata

Binomial name
- Parapomecyna flavomaculata Breuning, 1968

Genus of beetles

Parapomecyna flavomaculata is a species of beetle in the family Cerambycidae, and the only species in the genus Parapomecyna. It was described by Breuning in 1968.
