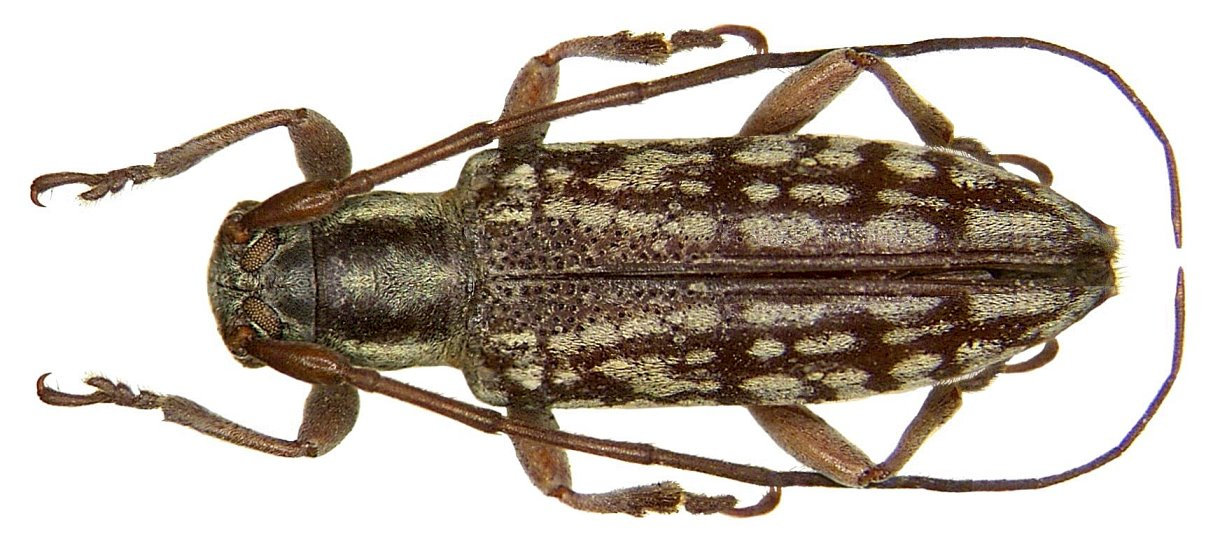

Scientific classification
- Kingdom: Animalia
- Phylum: Arthropoda
- Class: Insecta
- Order: Coleoptera
- Suborder: Polyphaga
- Infraorder: Cucujiformia
- Family: Cerambycidae
- Genus: Pithodia
- Species: P. tessellata

Binomial name
- Pithodia tessellata Pascoe, 1865

= Pithodia =

Genus of beetles

Pithodia tessellata is a species of beetle in the family Cerambycidae, and the only species in the genus Pithodia. It was described by Pascoe in 1865.
