= Tetrarpages =

Scientific classification
- Kingdom: Animalia
- Phylum: Arthropoda
- Class: Insecta
- Order: Coleoptera
- Suborder: Polyphaga
- Infraorder: Cucujiformia
- Family: Cerambycidae
- Genus: Tetrarpages
- Species: T. lansbergei

Binomial name
- Tetrarpages lansbergei Thomson, 1868

Genus of beetles

Tetrarpages lansbergei is a species of beetle in the family Cerambycidae, and the only species in the genus Tetrarpages. It was described by Thomson in 1868.
