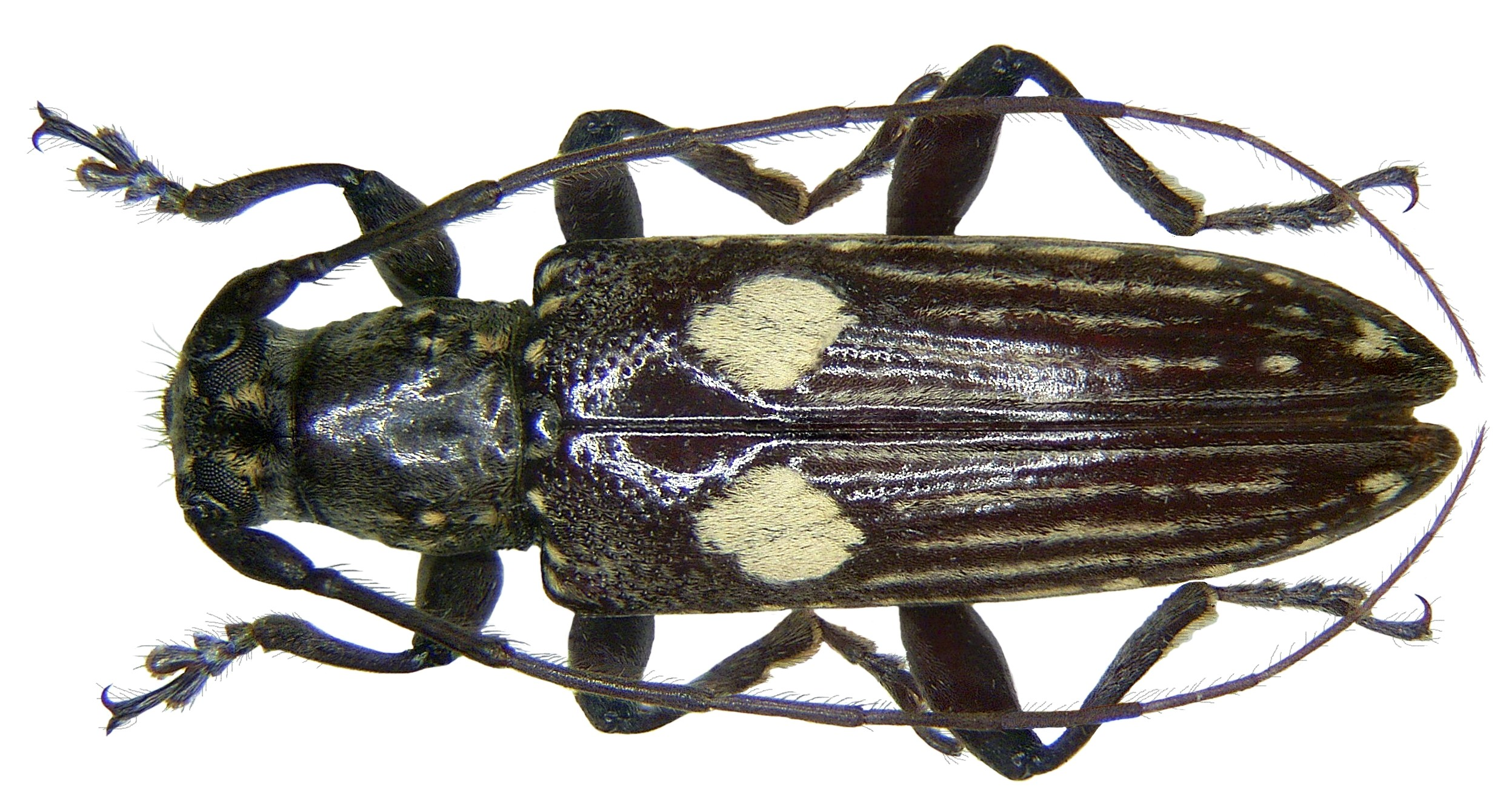

Scientific classification
- Kingdom: Animalia
- Phylum: Arthropoda
- Class: Insecta
- Order: Coleoptera
- Suborder: Polyphaga
- Infraorder: Cucujiformia
- Family: Cerambycidae
- Genus: Elaidius
- Species: E. biplagiatus

Binomial name
- Elaidius biplagiatus Breuning, 1942

= Elaidius =

Genus of beetles

Elaidius biplagiatus is a species of beetle in the family Cerambycidae, and the only species in the genus Elaidius. It was described by Breuning in 1942.
