= Microleroides =

Scientific classification
- Kingdom: Animalia
- Phylum: Arthropoda
- Class: Insecta
- Order: Coleoptera
- Suborder: Polyphaga
- Infraorder: Cucujiformia
- Family: Cerambycidae
- Genus: Microleroides
- Species: M. chinensis

Binomial name
- Microleroides chinensis Breuning, 1956

Genus of beetles

Microleroides chinensis is a species of beetle in the family Cerambycidae, and the only species in the genus Microleroides. It was described by Breuning in 1956.
