= Somatolita =

Scientific classification
- Domain: Eukaryota
- Kingdom: Animalia
- Phylum: Arthropoda
- Class: Insecta
- Order: Coleoptera
- Suborder: Polyphaga
- Infraorder: Cucujiformia
- Family: Cerambycidae
- Genus: Somatolita
- Species: S. neavei

Binomial name
- Somatolita neavei Aurivillius, 1914

Genus of beetles

Somatolita neavei is a species of beetle in the family Cerambycidae, and the only species in the genus Somatolita. It was described by Per Olof Christopher Aurivillius in 1914.
