= Enispiella =

Scientific classification
- Kingdom: Animalia
- Phylum: Arthropoda
- Class: Insecta
- Order: Coleoptera
- Suborder: Polyphaga
- Infraorder: Cucujiformia
- Family: Cerambycidae
- Genus: Enispiella
- Species: E. grisella

Binomial name
- Enispiella grisella Breuning, 1938

Genus of beetles

Enispiella grisella is a species of beetle in the family Cerambycidae, and the only species in the genus Enispiella. It was described by Breuning in 1938.
