= Mimepilysta =

Scientific classification
- Kingdom: Animalia
- Phylum: Arthropoda
- Class: Insecta
- Order: Coleoptera
- Suborder: Polyphaga
- Infraorder: Cucujiformia
- Family: Cerambycidae
- Genus: Mimepilysta
- Species: M. compacta

Binomial name
- Mimepilysta compacta (Breuning, 1939)

Genus of beetles

Mimepilysta compacta is a species of beetle in the family Cerambycidae, and the only species in the genus Mimepilysta. It was described by Stephan von Breuning in 1939.
