= Pseudapomecyna =

Scientific classification
- Kingdom: Animalia
- Phylum: Arthropoda
- Class: Insecta
- Order: Coleoptera
- Suborder: Polyphaga
- Infraorder: Cucujiformia
- Family: Cerambycidae
- Genus: Pseudapomecyna
- Species: P. klugii

Binomial name
- Pseudapomecyna klugii (Thomson, 1868)

Genus of beetles

Pseudapomecyna klugii is a species of beetle in the family Cerambycidae, and the only species in the genus Pseudapomecyna. It was described by Thomson in 1868.
