= Epaphra =

Scientific classification
- Kingdom: Animalia
- Phylum: Arthropoda
- Class: Insecta
- Order: Coleoptera
- Suborder: Polyphaga
- Infraorder: Cucujiformia
- Family: Cerambycidae
- Genus: Epaphra
- Species: E. valga

Binomial name
- Epaphra valga Newman, 1842

Genus of beetles

Epaphra valga is a species of beetle in the family Cerambycidae, and the only species in the genus Epaphra. It was described by Newman in 1842.
