= Mimoxenoleoides =

Scientific classification
- Kingdom: Animalia
- Phylum: Arthropoda
- Class: Insecta
- Order: Coleoptera
- Suborder: Polyphaga
- Infraorder: Cucujiformia
- Family: Cerambycidae
- Genus: Mimoxenoleoides
- Species: M. fasciculosa

Binomial name
- Mimoxenoleoides fasciculosa Breuning, 1963

Genus of beetles

Mimoxenoleoides fasciculosa is a species of beetle in the family Cerambycidae, and the only species in the genus Mimoxenoleoides. It was described by Breuning in 1963.
