= Niphosaperda =

Scientific classification
- Kingdom: Animalia
- Phylum: Arthropoda
- Class: Insecta
- Order: Coleoptera
- Suborder: Polyphaga
- Infraorder: Cucujiformia
- Family: Cerambycidae
- Genus: Niphosaperda
- Species: N. rondoni

Binomial name
- Niphosaperda rondoni Breuning, 1962

Genus of beetles

Niphosaperda rondoni is a species of beetle in the family Cerambycidae, and the only species in the genus Niphosaperda. It was described by Breuning in 1962.
