= Falsoropicoides =

Scientific classification
- Kingdom: Animalia
- Phylum: Arthropoda
- Class: Insecta
- Order: Coleoptera
- Suborder: Polyphaga
- Infraorder: Cucujiformia
- Family: Cerambycidae
- Genus: Falsoropicoides
- Species: F. laosensis

Binomial name
- Falsoropicoides laosensis Breuning, 1964

Genus of beetles

Falsoropicoides laosensis is a species of beetle in the family Cerambycidae, and the only species in the genus Falsoropicoides. It was described by Breuning in 1964.
