= Cauca contestata =

Scientific classification
- Kingdom: Animalia
- Phylum: Arthropoda
- Class: Insecta
- Order: Coleoptera
- Suborder: Polyphaga
- Infraorder: Cucujiformia
- Family: Cerambycidae
- Subfamily: Lamiinae
- Tribe: Apomecynini
- Genus: Cauca; Lane, 1970
- Species: C. contestata

Binomial name
- Cauca contestata Lane, 1970

Genus of beetles

Cauca contestata is a species of longhorned beetle in the family Cerambycidae.
