= Falsomoechotypoides =

Scientific classification
- Kingdom: Animalia
- Phylum: Arthropoda
- Class: Insecta
- Order: Coleoptera
- Suborder: Polyphaga
- Infraorder: Cucujiformia
- Family: Cerambycidae
- Genus: Falsomoechotypoides
- Species: F. excavatipennis

Binomial name
- Falsomoechotypoides excavatipennis Breuning, 1959

Genus of beetles

Falsomoechotypoides excavatipennis is a species of beetle in the family Cerambycidae, and the only species in the genus Falsomoechotypoides. It was described by Breuning in 1959.
