= Laosepilysta =

Scientific classification
- Kingdom: Animalia
- Phylum: Arthropoda
- Class: Insecta
- Order: Coleoptera
- Suborder: Polyphaga
- Infraorder: Cucujiformia
- Family: Cerambycidae
- Genus: Laosepilysta
- Species: L. flavolineata

Binomial name
- Laosepilysta flavolineata Breuning, 1964

Genus of beetles

Laosepilysta flavolineata is a species of beetle in the family Cerambycidae, and the only species in the genus Laosepilysta. It was described by Breuning in 1964.
