= Spineuteleuta =

Scientific classification
- Kingdom: Animalia
- Phylum: Arthropoda
- Class: Insecta
- Order: Coleoptera
- Suborder: Polyphaga
- Infraorder: Cucujiformia
- Family: Cerambycidae
- Genus: Spineuteleuta
- Species: S. celebensis

Binomial name
- Spineuteleuta celebensis Breuning, 1961

Genus of beetles

Spineuteleuta celebensis is a species of beetle in the family Cerambycidae, and the only species in the genus Spineuteleuta. It was described by Breuning in 1961.
