= Eremophanoides =

Scientific classification
- Kingdom: Animalia
- Phylum: Arthropoda
- Class: Insecta
- Order: Coleoptera
- Suborder: Polyphaga
- Infraorder: Cucujiformia
- Family: Cerambycidae
- Genus: Eremophanoides; Breuning, 1978
- Species: E. tanganjicae

Binomial name
- Eremophanoides tanganjicae Breuning, 1978

Genus of beetles

Eremophanoides tanganjicae is a species of beetle in the family Cerambycidae, and the only species in the genus Eremophanoides. It was described by Stephan von Breuning in 1978. It is known from the Uluguru Mountains, Tanzania.

Eremophanoides tanganjicae measure 15 mm (0.59 in) in length.
