= Leptophaula =

Scientific classification
- Kingdom: Animalia
- Phylum: Arthropoda
- Class: Insecta
- Order: Coleoptera
- Suborder: Polyphaga
- Infraorder: Cucujiformia
- Family: Cerambycidae
- Genus: Leptophaula
- Species: L. femoralis

Binomial name
- Leptophaula femoralis Breuning 1940

Genus of beetles

Leptophaula femoralis is a species of beetle in the family Cerambycidae, and the only species in the genus Leptophaula. It was described by Breuning in 1940.
