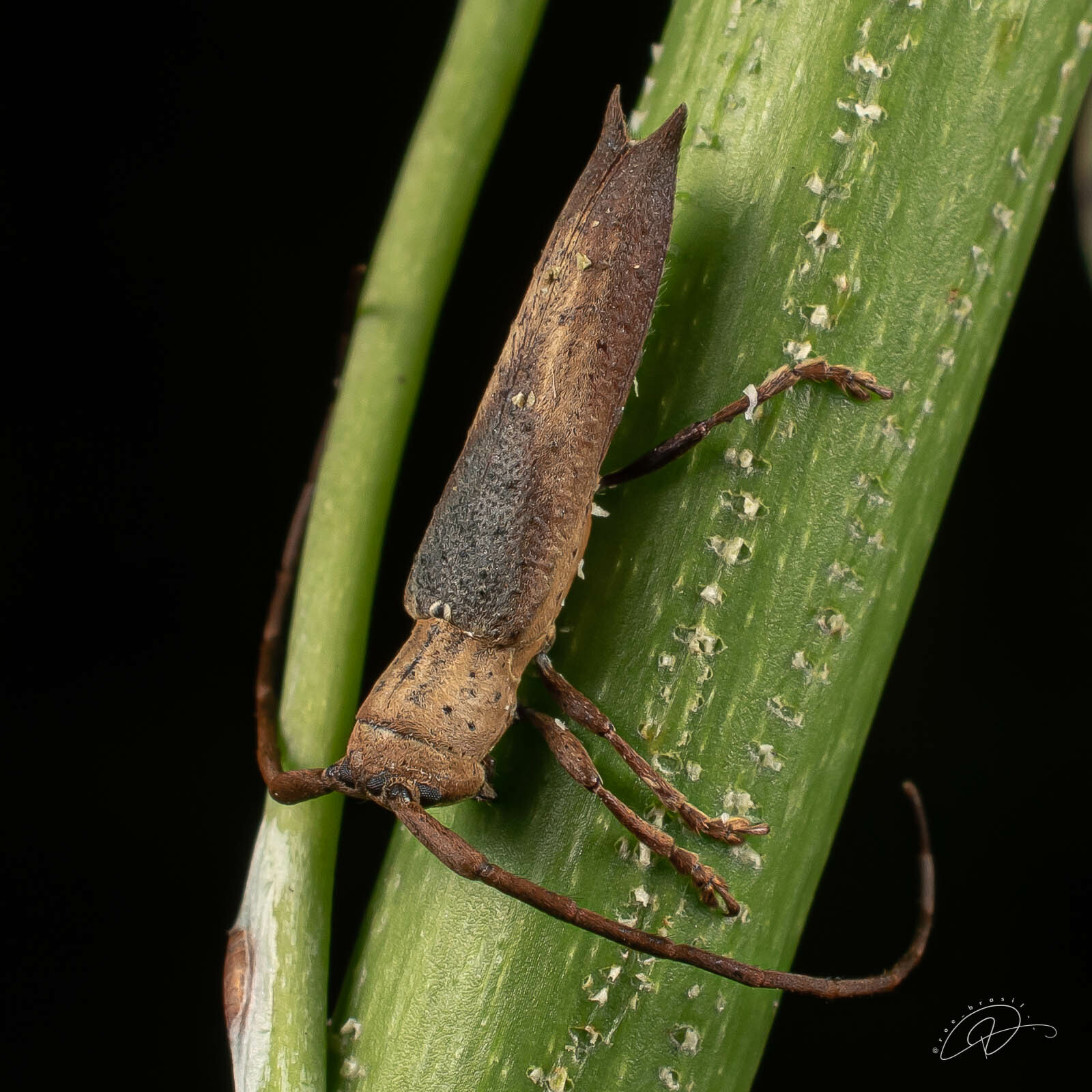

Scientific classification
- Kingdom: Animalia
- Phylum: Arthropoda
- Class: Insecta
- Order: Coleoptera
- Suborder: Polyphaga
- Infraorder: Cucujiformia
- Family: Cerambycidae
- Genus: Pseudepectasis
- Species: P. bispinosa

Binomial name
- Pseudepectasis bispinosa Breuning, 1940

= Pseudepectasis =

Pseudepectasis bispinosa

Genus of beetles

Pseudepectasis is a genus of beetles in the family Cerambycidae. It is monotypic, being represented by the single species Pseudepectasis bispinosa.
