= Eosybra =

Scientific classification
- Kingdom: Animalia
- Phylum: Arthropoda
- Class: Insecta
- Order: Coleoptera
- Suborder: Polyphaga
- Infraorder: Cucujiformia
- Family: Cerambycidae
- Genus: Eosybra
- Species: E. bipunctata

Binomial name
- Eosybra bipunctata Breuning, 1942

Genus of beetles

Eosybra bipunctata is a species of beetle in the family Cerambycidae, and the only species in the genus Eosybra. It was described by Breuning in 1942.
