= Cristoopsis =

Scientific classification
- Kingdom: Animalia
- Phylum: Arthropoda
- Class: Insecta
- Order: Coleoptera
- Suborder: Polyphaga
- Infraorder: Cucujiformia
- Family: Cerambycidae
- Genus: Cristoopsis
- Species: C. poggea

Binomial name
- Cristoopsis poggea Dillon & Dillon, 1952

Genus of beetles

Cristoopsis poggea is a species of beetle in the family Cerambycidae, and the only species in the genus Cristoopsis. It was described by Dillon and Dillon in 1952.
