= Parichthyodes =

Scientific classification
- Kingdom: Animalia
- Phylum: Arthropoda
- Class: Insecta
- Order: Coleoptera
- Suborder: Polyphaga
- Infraorder: Cucujiformia
- Family: Cerambycidae
- Genus: Parichthyodes
- Species: P. samoana

Binomial name
- Parichthyodes samoana Breuning, 1959

Genus of beetles

Parichthyodes samoana is a species of beetle in the family Cerambycidae, and the only species in the genus Parichthyodes. It was described by Breuning in 1959.
