= Pseudosybroides =

Scientific classification
- Kingdom: Animalia
- Phylum: Arthropoda
- Class: Insecta
- Order: Coleoptera
- Suborder: Polyphaga
- Infraorder: Cucujiformia
- Family: Cerambycidae
- Genus: Pseudosybroides
- Species: P. flavescens

Binomial name
- Pseudosybroides flavescens (Breuning, 1972)

Genus of beetles

Pseudosybroides flavescens is a species of beetle in the family Cerambycidae, and the only species in the genus Pseudosybroides. It was described by Breuning in 1972.
