= Cyrtinoopsis =

Scientific classification
- Kingdom: Animalia
- Phylum: Arthropoda
- Class: Insecta
- Order: Coleoptera
- Suborder: Polyphaga
- Infraorder: Cucujiformia
- Family: Cerambycidae
- Genus: Cyrtinoopsis
- Species: C. intensa

Binomial name
- Cyrtinoopsis intensa Dillon & Dillon, 1952

Genus of beetles

Cyrtinoopsis intensa is a species of beetle in the family Cerambycidae, and the only species in the genus Cyrtinoopsis. It was described by Dillon and Dillon in 1952.
