= Tricheunidia =

Scientific classification
- Kingdom: Animalia
- Phylum: Arthropoda
- Class: Insecta
- Order: Coleoptera
- Suborder: Polyphaga
- Infraorder: Cucujiformia
- Family: Cerambycidae
- Genus: Tricheunidia
- Species: T. fuscovariegata

Binomial name
- Tricheunidia fuscovariegata Breuning, 1940

Genus of beetles

Tricheunidia fuscovariegata is a species of beetle in the family Cerambycidae, and the only species in the genus Tricheunidia. It was described by Breuning in 1940.
