= Discolops =

Scientific classification
- Kingdom: Animalia
- Phylum: Arthropoda
- Class: Insecta
- Order: Coleoptera
- Suborder: Polyphaga
- Infraorder: Cucujiformia
- Family: Cerambycidae
- Genus: Discolops
- Species: D. strigicollis

Binomial name
- Discolops strigicollis Fairmaire, 1886

Genus of beetles

Discolops strigicollis is a species of beetle in the family Cerambycidae, and the only species in the genus Discolops. It was described by Fairmaire in 1886.
