= Pseudosybra =

Scientific classification
- Kingdom: Animalia
- Phylum: Arthropoda
- Class: Insecta
- Order: Coleoptera
- Suborder: Polyphaga
- Infraorder: Cucujiformia
- Family: Cerambycidae
- Genus: Pseudosybra
- Species: P. cristata

Binomial name
- Pseudosybra cristata (Breuning, 1939)

Genus of beetles

Pseudosybra cristata is a species of beetle in the family Cerambycidae, and the only species in the genus Pseudosybra. It was described by Breuning in 1939.
