= Zeargyrodes =

Scientific classification
- Kingdom: Animalia
- Phylum: Arthropoda
- Class: Insecta
- Order: Coleoptera
- Suborder: Polyphaga
- Infraorder: Cucujiformia
- Family: Cerambycidae
- Genus: Zeargyrodes
- Species: Z. fasciatus

Binomial name
- Zeargyrodes fasciatus Fisher, 1925

Genus of beetles

Zeargyrodes fasciatus is a species of beetle in the family Cerambycidae, and the only species in the genus Zeargyrodes. It was described by Fisher in 1925.
