= Pseudepilysta =

Scientific classification
- Kingdom: Animalia
- Phylum: Arthropoda
- Class: Insecta
- Order: Coleoptera
- Suborder: Polyphaga
- Infraorder: Cucujiformia
- Family: Cerambycidae
- Genus: Pseudepilysta
- Species: P. loebli

Binomial name
- Pseudepilysta loebli Hüdepohl, 1996

Genus of beetles

Pseudepilysta loebli is a species of beetle in the family Cerambycidae, and the only species in the genus Pseudepilysta. It was described by Hüdepohl in 1996.
