= Mimatybe =

Scientific classification
- Kingdom: Animalia
- Phylum: Arthropoda
- Class: Insecta
- Order: Coleoptera
- Suborder: Polyphaga
- Infraorder: Cucujiformia
- Family: Cerambycidae
- Genus: Mimatybe
- Species: M. pauliani

Binomial name
- Mimatybe pauliani Breuning, 1957

Genus of beetles

Mimatybe pauliani is a species of beetle in the family Cerambycidae, and the only species in the genus Mimatybe. It was described by Breuning in 1957.
