= Iproca =

Scientific classification
- Kingdom: Animalia
- Phylum: Arthropoda
- Class: Insecta
- Order: Coleoptera
- Suborder: Polyphaga
- Infraorder: Cucujiformia
- Family: Cerambycidae
- Genus: Iproca

Genus of beetles

Iproca is a genus of beetles in the family Cerambycidae, containing the following species:

- Iproca acuminata Gressitt, 1940
- Iproca aoyamaorum Hasegawa & Ohbayashi, 2006
- Iproca flavolineata Hayashi, 1971
- Iproca ishigakiana Breuning & Ohbayashi, 1966
- Iproca laosensis Breuning, 1968
- Iproca pedongensis Breuning, 1969
