= Mimofalsoropica =

Scientific classification
- Kingdom: Animalia
- Phylum: Arthropoda
- Class: Insecta
- Order: Coleoptera
- Suborder: Polyphaga
- Infraorder: Cucujiformia
- Family: Cerambycidae
- Genus: Mimofalsoropica
- Species: M. kaszabi

Binomial name
- Mimofalsoropica kaszabi Breuning, 1975

Genus of beetles

Mimofalsoropica kaszabi is a species of beetle in the family Cerambycidae, and the only species in the genus Mimofalsoropica. It was described by Breuning in 1975.
