= Undulatodoliops =

Scientific classification
- Kingdom: Animalia
- Phylum: Arthropoda
- Class: Insecta
- Order: Coleoptera
- Suborder: Polyphaga
- Infraorder: Cucujiformia
- Family: Cerambycidae
- Genus: Undulatodoliops
- Species: U. undulatofasciata

Binomial name
- Undulatodoliops undulatofasciata (Breuning, 1947)

Genus of beetles

Undulatodoliops undulatofasciata is a species of beetle in the family Cerambycidae, and the only species in the genus Undulatodoliops. It was described by Breuning in 1947.
