= Parasybrodiboma =

Scientific classification
- Kingdom: Animalia
- Phylum: Arthropoda
- Class: Insecta
- Order: Coleoptera
- Suborder: Polyphaga
- Infraorder: Cucujiformia
- Family: Cerambycidae
- Genus: Parasybrodiboma
- Species: P. sikkimensis

Binomial name
- Parasybrodiboma sikkimensis Breuning, 1969

Genus of beetles

Parasybrodiboma sikkimensis is a species of beetle in the family Cerambycidae, and the only species in the genus Parasybrodiboma. It was described by Breuning in 1969.
