= Mimotetrorea =

Scientific classification
- Kingdom: Animalia
- Phylum: Arthropoda
- Class: Insecta
- Order: Coleoptera
- Suborder: Polyphaga
- Infraorder: Cucujiformia
- Family: Cerambycidae
- Genus: Mimotetrorea
- Species: M. spinipennis

Binomial name
- Mimotetrorea spinipennis Breuning, 1973

Genus of beetles

Mimotetrorea spinipennis is a species of beetle in the family Cerambycidae, and the only species in the genus Mimotetrorea. It was described by Breuning in 1973.
