= Parathylia =

Scientific classification
- Kingdom: Animalia
- Phylum: Arthropoda
- Class: Insecta
- Order: Coleoptera
- Suborder: Polyphaga
- Infraorder: Cucujiformia
- Family: Cerambycidae
- Genus: Parathylia
- Species: P. diversicornis

Binomial name
- Parathylia diversicornis Breuning, 1958

Genus of beetles

Parathylia diversicornis is a species of beetle in the family Cerambycidae, and the only species in the genus Parathylia. It was described by Breuning in 1958.
