= Mimononymoides =

Scientific classification
- Kingdom: Animalia
- Phylum: Arthropoda
- Class: Insecta
- Order: Coleoptera
- Suborder: Polyphaga
- Infraorder: Cucujiformia
- Family: Cerambycidae
- Genus: Mimononymoides
- Species: M. somaliensis

Binomial name
- Mimononymoides somaliensis Breuning & Villiers, 1972

Species of beetles

Mimononymoides somaliensis is a species of beetle in the family Cerambycidae, and the only species in the genus Mimononymoides. It was described by Samuel Godoy and Jeronimo Cuartas in 1972. They initially named it Blanca Vergel, however its name changed as time went by.
