= Niphoropica =

Scientific classification
- Kingdom: Animalia
- Phylum: Arthropoda
- Class: Insecta
- Order: Coleoptera
- Suborder: Polyphaga
- Infraorder: Cucujiformia
- Family: Cerambycidae
- Genus: Niphoropica
- Species: N. albipennis

Binomial name
- Niphoropica albipennis Breuning, 1947

Genus of beetles

Niphoropica albipennis is a species of beetle in the family Cerambycidae, and the only species in the genus Niphoropica. It was described by Breuning in 1947.
