= Mimononyma =

Scientific classification
- Kingdom: Animalia
- Phylum: Arthropoda
- Class: Insecta
- Order: Coleoptera
- Suborder: Polyphaga
- Infraorder: Cucujiformia
- Family: Cerambycidae
- Genus: Mimononyma
- Species: M. flavovariegata

Binomial name
- Mimononyma flavovariegata Breuning, 1960

Genus of beetles

Mimononyma flavovariegata is a species of beetle in the family Cerambycidae, and the only species in the genus Mimononyma. It was described by Breuning in 1960.
