= Clavisybra =

Scientific classification
- Kingdom: Animalia
- Phylum: Arthropoda
- Class: Insecta
- Order: Coleoptera
- Suborder: Polyphaga
- Infraorder: Cucujiformia
- Family: Cerambycidae
- Genus: Clavisybra
- Species: C. strandiella

Binomial name
- Clavisybra strandiella Breuning 1943

Genus of beetles

Clavisybra strandiella is a species of beetle in the family Cerambycidae, and the only species in the genus Clavisybra. It was described by Breuning in 1943.
