= Coomanum =

Scientific classification
- Kingdom: Animalia
- Phylum: Arthropoda
- Class: Insecta
- Order: Coleoptera
- Suborder: Polyphaga
- Infraorder: Cucujiformia
- Family: Cerambycidae
- Genus: Coomanum
- Species: C. singulare

Binomial name
- Coomanum singulare Pic, 1927

Genus of beetles

Coomanum singulare is a species of beetle in the family Cerambycidae, and the only species in the genus Coomanum. It was described by Pic in 1927.
