= Pseudozorilispe =

Scientific classification
- Kingdom: Animalia
- Phylum: Arthropoda
- Class: Insecta
- Order: Coleoptera
- Suborder: Polyphaga
- Infraorder: Cucujiformia
- Family: Cerambycidae
- Genus: Pseudozorilispe
- Species: P. nitida

Binomial name
- Pseudozorilispe nitida (Breuning, 1940)

Genus of beetles

Pseudozorilispe nitida is a species of beetle in the family Cerambycidae, and the only species in the genus Pseudozorilispe. It was described by Breuning in 1940.
