= Falsozorispiella =

Scientific classification
- Kingdom: Animalia
- Phylum: Arthropoda
- Class: Insecta
- Order: Coleoptera
- Suborder: Polyphaga
- Infraorder: Cucujiformia
- Family: Cerambycidae
- Genus: Falsozorispiella
- Species: F. albosignata

Binomial name
- Falsozorispiella albosignata (Pic, 1945)

Genus of beetles

Falsozorispiella albosignata is a species of beetle in the family Cerambycidae, and the only species in the genus Falsozorispiella. It was described by Pic in 1945.
