= Zorilispiella =

Scientific classification
- Kingdom: Animalia
- Phylum: Arthropoda
- Class: Insecta
- Order: Coleoptera
- Suborder: Polyphaga
- Infraorder: Cucujiformia
- Family: Cerambycidae
- Genus: Zorilispiella
- Species: Z. rufipennis

Binomial name
- Zorilispiella rufipennis (Pic, 1926)

Genus of beetles

Zorilispiella rufipennis is a species of beetle in the family Cerambycidae, and the only species in the genus Zorilispiella. It was described by Maurice Pic in 1926.
