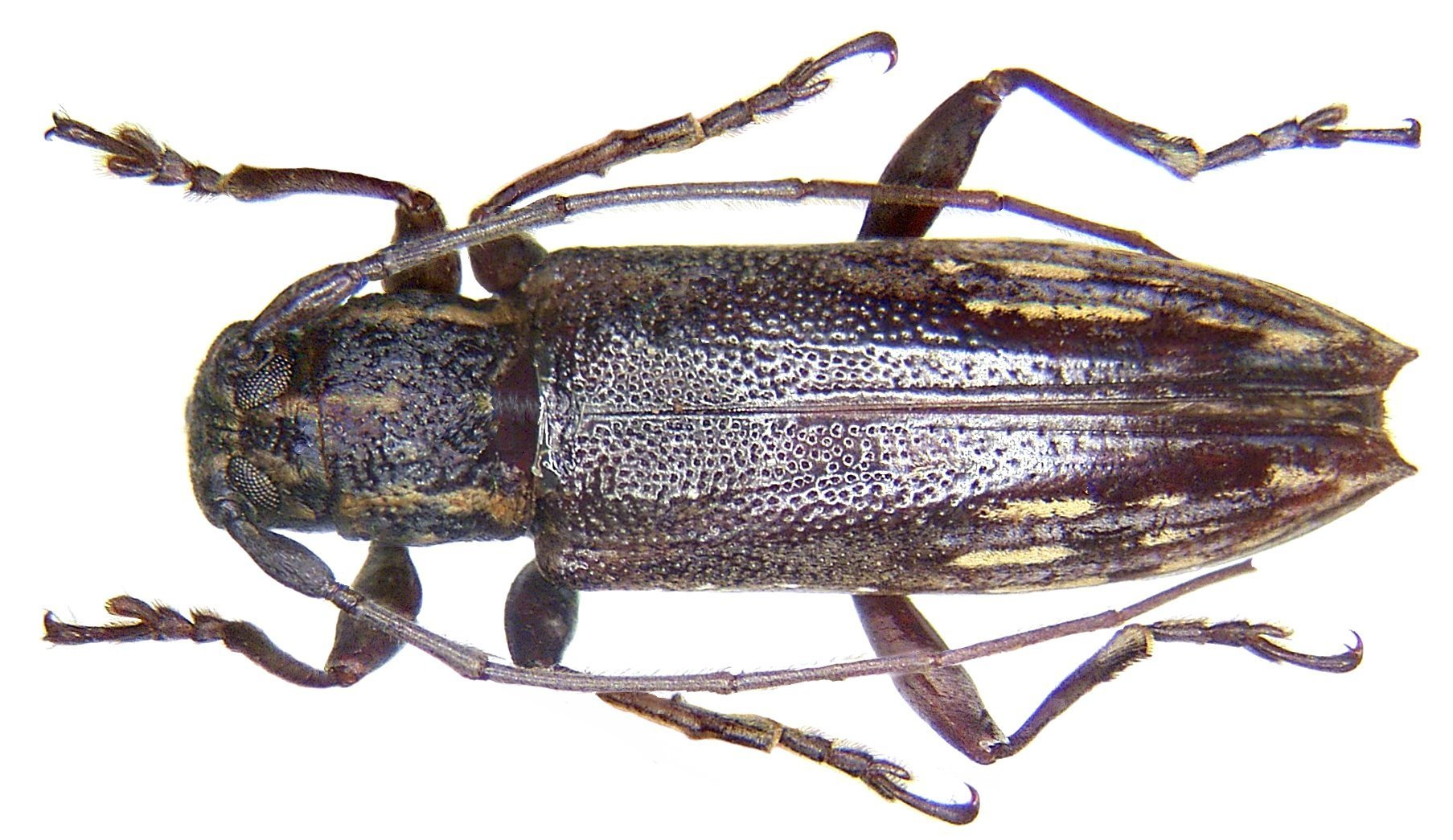
- Mimosybra surigaonis

Scientific classification
- Kingdom: Animalia
- Phylum: Arthropoda
- Class: Insecta
- Order: Coleoptera
- Suborder: Polyphaga
- Infraorder: Cucujiformia
- Family: Cerambycidae
- Subfamily: Lamiinae
- Tribe: Apomecynini
- Genus: Mimosybra; Breuning, 1939

Type species
- Orinoeme surigaonis Heller, 1924

= Mimosybra =

Genus of beetles

Mimosybra is a genus of beetles in the family Cerambycidae, containing the following species:

- Mimosybra alternans Breuning, 1973
- Mimosybra baloghi Breuning, 1975
- Mimosybra basigranosa Breuning, 1939
- Mimosybra bimaculata Breuning, 1973
- Mimosybra bipunctata Breuning, 1951
- Mimosybra carinipennis Breuning, 1940
- Mimosybra continentalis Breuning, 1965
- Mimosybra discreta (Pascoe, 1865)
- Mimosybra fergussoni Breuning, 1970
- Mimosybra flavomaculata Breuning, 1964
- Mimosybra gebeensis Breuning, 1961
- Mimosybra kaszabi Breuning, 1975
- Mimosybra laevicollis Breuning, 1939
- Mimosybra latefasciata Breuning, 1963
- Mimosybra mediomaculata Breuning, 1939
- Mimosybra negrosensis Breuning, 1970
- Mimosybra paraspinipennis Breuning, 1977
- Mimosybra postlineata Hüdepohl, 1995
- Mimosybra salomonum Breuning, 1939
- Mimosybra samarensis Breuning, 1970
- Mimosybra schultzei (Breuning, 1966)
- Mimosybra similis Breuning, 1975
- Mimosybra spinipennis Breuning, 1975
- Mimosybra surigaonis (Heller, 1924)
- Mimosybra triguttata (Aurivillius, 1927)
- Mimosybra trimaculata Breuning, 1953
- Mimosybra uniformis Breuning, 1939
