= Orinoeme =

Scientific classification
- Kingdom: Animalia
- Phylum: Arthropoda
- Class: Insecta
- Order: Coleoptera
- Suborder: Polyphaga
- Infraorder: Cucujiformia
- Family: Cerambycidae
- Subfamily: Lamiinae
- Tribe: Apomecynini
- Genus: Orinoeme; Pascoe, 1867

Genus of beetles

Orinoeme is a genus of beetles in the family Cerambycidae, containing the following species:

- Orinoeme acutipennis Pascoe, 1867
- Orinoeme biplagiata (Breuning, 1939)
- Orinoeme centurio (Pascoe, 1866)
- Orinoeme chalybeata Pascoe, 1867
- Orinoeme ciliata (Breuning, 1939)
- Orinoeme dunni (Breuning, 1976)
- Orinoeme indistincta (Breuning, 1939)
- Orinoeme kaszabi (Breuning, 1969)
- Orinoeme lineatopunctata (Breuning, 1959)
- Orinoeme lineigera Pascoe, 1867
- Orinoeme lineigeroides (Breuning, 1939)
- Orinoeme loriai (Breuning, 1943)
- Orinoeme maculicollis Aurivillius, 1916
- Orinoeme maxima Heller, 1914
- Orinoeme nigripes (Breuning, 1975)
- Orinoeme obliquata (Breuning, 1939)
- Orinoeme papuana (Breuning, 1939)
- Orinoeme parterufotibialis (Breuning, 1970)
- Orinoeme proxima (Breuning, 1939)
- Orinoeme punctata (Montrouzier, 1855)
- Orinoeme puncticollis Pascoe, 1867
- Orinoeme rosselli (Breuning, 1970)
- Orinoeme rotundipennis (Breuning, 1939)
- Orinoeme rubricollis MacLeay, 1886
- Orinoeme rufipes (Breuning, 1975)
- Orinoeme rufitarsis Pascoe, 1867
- Orinoeme stictica (Breuning, 1948)
- Orinoeme striata Aurivillius, 1916
- Orinoeme sulciceps Gestro, 1876
- Orinoeme surigaonis Heller, 1923
- Orinoeme szekessyi (Breuning, 1953)
- Orinoeme ternatensis (Breuning, 1969)
- Orinoeme tricolor (Breuning, 1959)
- Orinoeme unicoloripennis (Breuning, 1959)
- Orinoeme websteri (Breuning, 1970)
- Orinoeme xanthosticta Gestro, 1876
