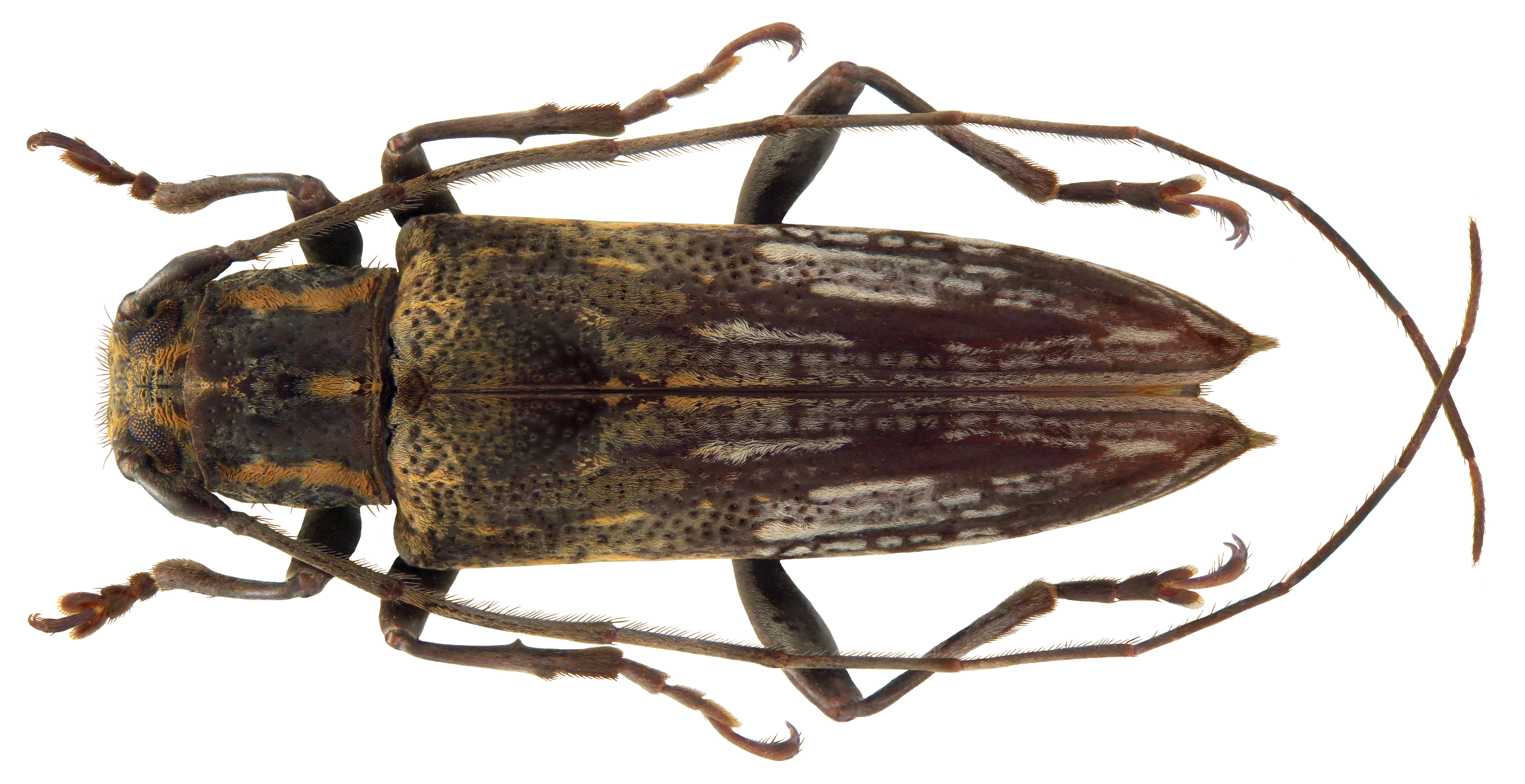

Scientific classification
- Domain: Eukaryota
- Kingdom: Animalia
- Phylum: Arthropoda
- Class: Insecta
- Order: Coleoptera
- Suborder: Polyphaga
- Infraorder: Cucujiformia
- Family: Cerambycidae
- Genus: Mimosybra
- Species: M. postlineata

Binomial name
- Mimosybra postlineata Hüdepohl, 1995

= Mimosybra postlineata =

Species of beetle

Mimosybra postlineata is a species of beetle in the family Cerambycidae. It was described by Hüdepohl in 1995.
