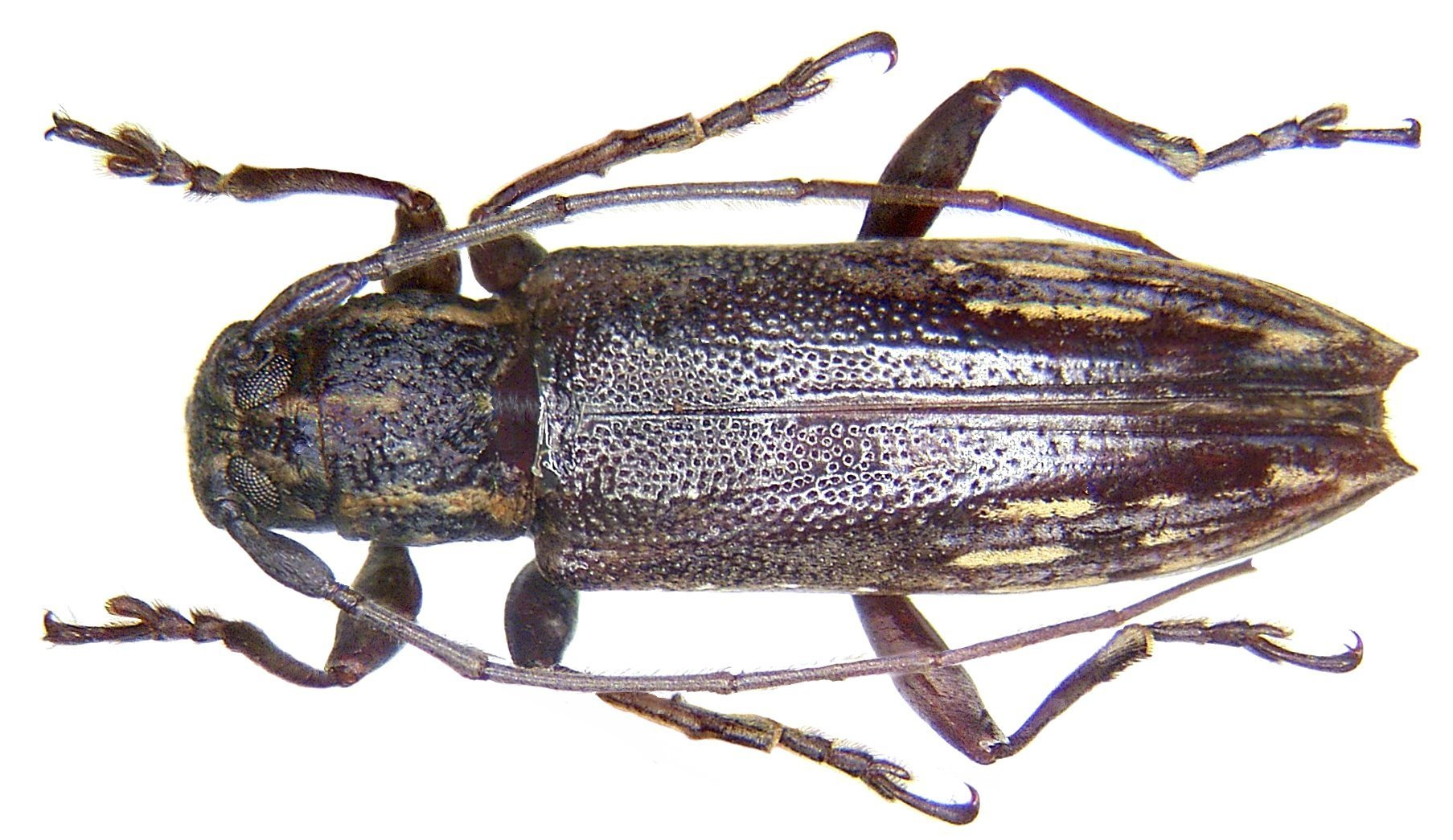

Scientific classification
- Domain: Eukaryota
- Kingdom: Animalia
- Phylum: Arthropoda
- Class: Insecta
- Order: Coleoptera
- Suborder: Polyphaga
- Infraorder: Cucujiformia
- Family: Cerambycidae
- Genus: Mimosybra
- Species: M. surigaonis

Binomial name
- Mimosybra surigaonis (Heller, 1924)

= Mimosybra surigaonis =

Species of beetle

Mimosybra surigaonis is a species of beetle in the family Cerambycidae. It was described by Heller in 1924.
