= Mimosybra latefasciata =

Scientific classification
- Kingdom: Animalia
- Phylum: Arthropoda
- Class: Insecta
- Order: Coleoptera
- Suborder: Polyphaga
- Infraorder: Cucujiformia
- Family: Cerambycidae
- Genus: Mimosybra
- Species: M. latefasciata

Binomial name
- Mimosybra latefasciata Breuning, 1963

Species of beetle

Mimosybra latefasciata is a species of beetle in the family Cerambycidae. It was described by Breuning in 1963.
