= Orinoeme maxima =

Scientific classification
- Kingdom: Animalia
- Phylum: Arthropoda
- Class: Insecta
- Order: Coleoptera
- Suborder: Polyphaga
- Infraorder: Cucujiformia
- Family: Cerambycidae
- Genus: Orinoeme
- Species: O. maxima

Binomial name
- Orinoeme maxima Heller, 1914

Species of beetle

Orinoeme maxima is a species of beetle in the family Cerambycidae. It was described by Heller in 1914.
