= Mimosybra gebeensis =

Scientific classification
- Kingdom: Animalia
- Phylum: Arthropoda
- Clade: Pancrustacea
- Class: Insecta
- Order: Coleoptera
- Suborder: Polyphaga
- Infraorder: Cucujiformia
- Family: Cerambycidae
- Genus: Mimosybra
- Species: M. gebeensis

Binomial name
- Mimosybra gebeensis Breuning, 1961

Species of beetle

Mimosybra gebeensis is a species of beetle in the family Cerambycidae. It was described by Breuning in 1961.
