= Orinoeme lineigera =

Scientific classification
- Kingdom: Animalia
- Phylum: Arthropoda
- Class: Insecta
- Order: Coleoptera
- Suborder: Polyphaga
- Infraorder: Cucujiformia
- Family: Cerambycidae
- Genus: Orinoeme
- Species: O. lineigera

Binomial name
- Orinoeme lineigera Pascoe, 1867

Species of beetle

Orinoeme lineigera is a species of beetle in the family Cerambycidae. It was described by Pascoe in 1867.
