= Orinoeme rufipes =

Scientific classification
- Kingdom: Animalia
- Phylum: Arthropoda
- Class: Insecta
- Order: Coleoptera
- Suborder: Polyphaga
- Infraorder: Cucujiformia
- Family: Cerambycidae
- Genus: Orinoeme
- Species: O. rufipes

Binomial name
- Orinoeme rufipes (Breuning, 1975)

Species of beetle

Orinoeme rufipes is a species of beetle in the family Cerambycidae. It was described by Breuning in 1975.
