= Orinoeme rosselli =

Scientific classification
- Kingdom: Animalia
- Phylum: Arthropoda
- Class: Insecta
- Order: Coleoptera
- Suborder: Polyphaga
- Infraorder: Cucujiformia
- Family: Cerambycidae
- Genus: Orinoeme
- Species: O. rosselli

Binomial name
- Orinoeme rosselli (Breuning, 1970)

Species of beetle

Orinoeme rosselli is a species of beetle in the family Cerambycidae. It was described by Breuning in 1970.
