= Orinoeme papuana =

Scientific classification
- Kingdom: Animalia
- Phylum: Arthropoda
- Class: Insecta
- Order: Coleoptera
- Suborder: Polyphaga
- Infraorder: Cucujiformia
- Family: Cerambycidae
- Genus: Orinoeme
- Species: O. papuana

Binomial name
- Orinoeme papuana (Breuning, 1939)

Species of beetle

Orinoeme papuana is a species of beetle in the family Cerambycidae. It was described by Breuning in 1939.
