= Mimosybra bipunctata =

Scientific classification
- Kingdom: Animalia
- Phylum: Arthropoda
- Class: Insecta
- Order: Coleoptera
- Suborder: Polyphaga
- Infraorder: Cucujiformia
- Family: Cerambycidae
- Genus: Mimosybra
- Species: M. bipunctata

Binomial name
- Mimosybra bipunctata Breuning, 1951

Species of beetle

Mimosybra bipunctata is a species of beetle in the family Cerambycidae. It was described by Breuning in 1951.
