= Orinoeme punctata =

Scientific classification
- Kingdom: Animalia
- Phylum: Arthropoda
- Class: Insecta
- Order: Coleoptera
- Suborder: Polyphaga
- Infraorder: Cucujiformia
- Family: Cerambycidae
- Genus: Orinoeme
- Species: O. punctata

Binomial name
- Orinoeme punctata (Montrouzier, 1855)

Species of beetle

Orinoeme punctata is a species of beetle in the family Cerambycidae. It was described by Xavier Montrouzier in 1855.
