= Orinoeme xanthosticta =

Scientific classification
- Kingdom: Animalia
- Phylum: Arthropoda
- Clade: Pancrustacea
- Class: Insecta
- Order: Coleoptera
- Suborder: Polyphaga
- Infraorder: Cucujiformia
- Family: Cerambycidae
- Genus: Orinoeme
- Species: O. xanthosticta

Binomial name
- Orinoeme xanthosticta Gestro, 1876

Species of beetle

Orinoeme xanthosticta is a species of beetle in the family Cerambycidae. It was described by Gestro in 1876.
