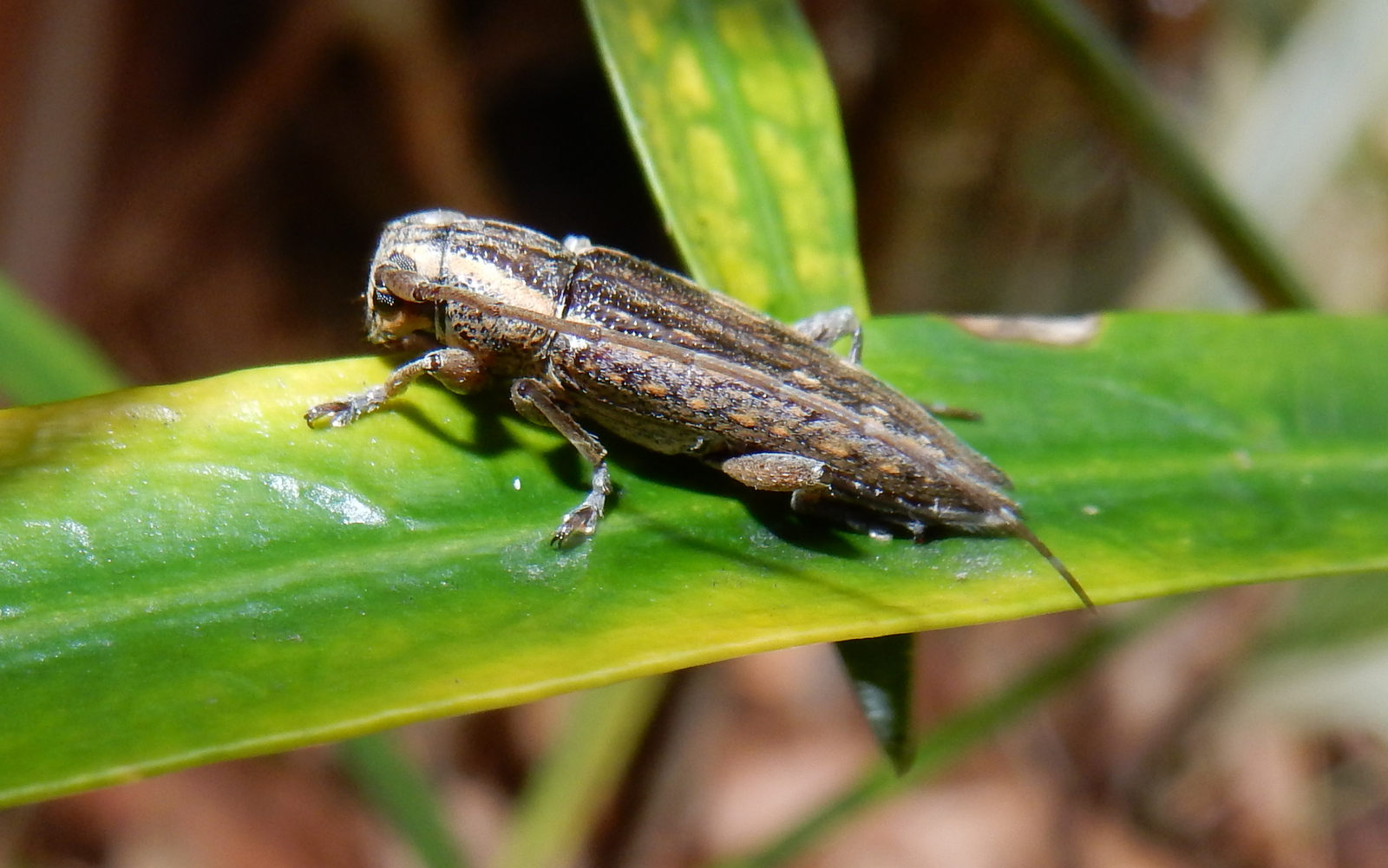

Scientific classification
- Kingdom: Animalia
- Phylum: Arthropoda
- Class: Insecta
- Order: Coleoptera
- Suborder: Polyphaga
- Infraorder: Cucujiformia
- Family: Cerambycidae
- Genus: Orinoeme
- Species: O. centurio

Binomial name
- Orinoeme centurio Pascoe 1861

= Orinoeme centurio =

Species of beetle

Orinoeme centurio is a species of beetle in the family Cerambycidae. It was described by Pascoe in 1866.
