= Orinoeme sulciceps =

Scientific classification
- Kingdom: Animalia
- Phylum: Arthropoda
- Class: Insecta
- Order: Coleoptera
- Suborder: Polyphaga
- Infraorder: Cucujiformia
- Family: Cerambycidae
- Genus: Orinoeme
- Species: O. sulciceps

Binomial name
- Orinoeme sulciceps Gestro, 1876

Species of beetle

Orinoeme sulciceps is a species of beetle in the family Cerambycidae. It was described by Gestro in 1876.
