= Orinoeme ternatensis =

Scientific classification
- Kingdom: Animalia
- Phylum: Arthropoda
- Class: Insecta
- Order: Coleoptera
- Suborder: Polyphaga
- Infraorder: Cucujiformia
- Family: Cerambycidae
- Genus: Orinoeme
- Species: O. ternatensis

Binomial name
- Orinoeme ternatensis (Breuning, 1969)

Species of beetle

Orinoeme ternatensis is a species of beetle in the family Cerambycidae. It was described by Breuning in 1969.
