= Mimosybra continentalis =

Scientific classification
- Kingdom: Animalia
- Phylum: Arthropoda
- Class: Insecta
- Order: Coleoptera
- Suborder: Polyphaga
- Infraorder: Cucujiformia
- Family: Cerambycidae
- Genus: Mimosybra
- Species: M. continentalis

Binomial name
- Mimosybra continentalis Breuning, 1965

Species of beetle

Mimosybra continentalis is a species of beetle in the family Cerambycidae. It was described by Breuning in 1965.
