= Orinoeme lineatopunctata =

Scientific classification
- Kingdom: Animalia
- Phylum: Arthropoda
- Class: Insecta
- Order: Coleoptera
- Suborder: Polyphaga
- Infraorder: Cucujiformia
- Family: Cerambycidae
- Genus: Orinoeme
- Species: O. lineatopunctata

Binomial name
- Orinoeme lineatopunctata (Breuning, 1959)

Synonyms
- Ichthyodes (Orinoeme) lineatopunctata Breuning, 1959

Species of beetle

Orinoeme lineatopunctata is a species of beetle in the family Cerambycidae. It was described by Stephan von Breuning in 1959. It is known from Astrolabe Bay, Papua New Guinea.

Orinoeme lineatopunctata measure 14 mm (0.55 in) in length.
