= Orinoeme biplagiata =

Scientific classification
- Kingdom: Animalia
- Phylum: Arthropoda
- Class: Insecta
- Order: Coleoptera
- Suborder: Polyphaga
- Infraorder: Cucujiformia
- Family: Cerambycidae
- Genus: Orinoeme
- Species: O. biplagiata

Binomial name
- Orinoeme biplagiata (Breuning, 1939)

Species of beetle

Orinoeme biplagiata is a species of beetle in the family Cerambycidae. It was described by Breuning in 1939.
