= Orinoeme rubricollis =

Scientific classification
- Kingdom: Animalia
- Phylum: Arthropoda
- Class: Insecta
- Order: Coleoptera
- Suborder: Polyphaga
- Infraorder: Cucujiformia
- Family: Cerambycidae
- Genus: Orinoeme
- Species: O. rubricollis

Binomial name
- Orinoeme rubricollis W. J. Macleay, 1886

Species of beetle

Orinoeme rubricollis is a species of beetle in the family Cerambycidae. It was described by William John Macleay in 1886.
