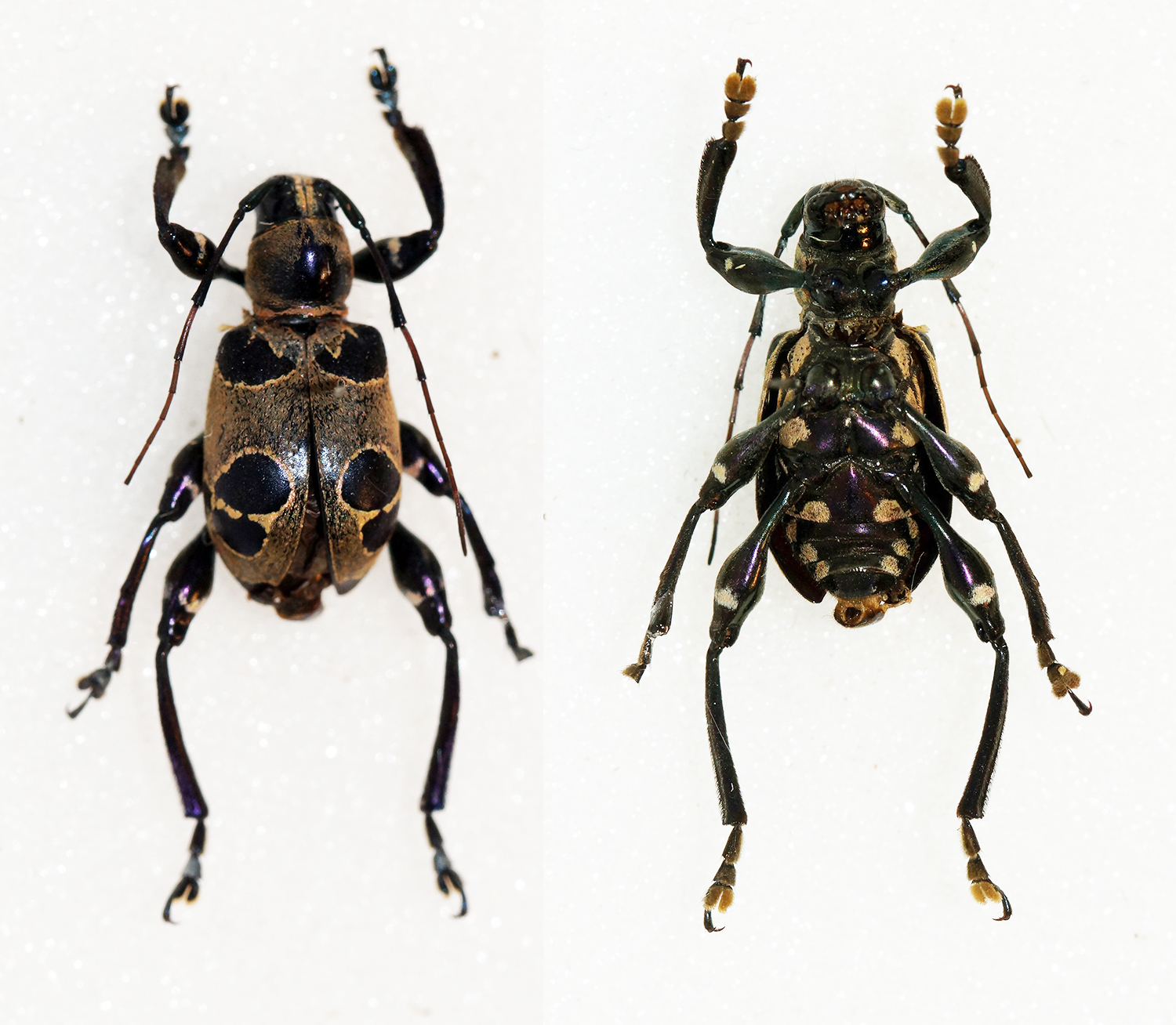

Scientific classification
- Kingdom: Animalia
- Phylum: Arthropoda
- Class: Insecta
- Order: Coleoptera
- Suborder: Polyphaga
- Infraorder: Cucujiformia
- Family: Cerambycidae
- Genus: Doliops
- Species: D. octomaculata

Binomial name
- Doliops octomaculata Breuning, 1928

= Doliops octomaculata =

Species of beetle

Doliops octomaculata is a species of beetle in the family Cerambycidae. It was described by Breuning in 1928.
