= Doliops gertrudis =

Scientific classification
- Kingdom: Animalia
- Phylum: Arthropoda
- Class: Insecta
- Order: Coleoptera
- Suborder: Polyphaga
- Infraorder: Cucujiformia
- Family: Cerambycidae
- Genus: Doliops
- Species: D. gertrudis

Binomial name
- Doliops gertrudis Hüdepohl, 1990

Species of beetle

Doliops gertrudis is a species of beetle in the family Cerambycidae, described by Karl-Ernst Hüdepohl in 1990.
