= Doliops frosti =

Scientific classification
- Kingdom: Animalia
- Phylum: Arthropoda
- Class: Insecta
- Order: Coleoptera
- Suborder: Polyphaga
- Infraorder: Cucujiformia
- Family: Cerambycidae
- Genus: Doliops
- Species: D. frosti

Binomial name
- Doliops frosti Schultze, 1923

Species of beetle

Doliops frosti is a species of beetle in the family Cerambycidae. It was described by Schultze in 1923.
