= Doliops animula =

Scientific classification
- Domain: Eukaryota
- Kingdom: Animalia
- Phylum: Arthropoda
- Class: Insecta
- Order: Coleoptera
- Suborder: Polyphaga
- Infraorder: Cucujiformia
- Family: Cerambycidae
- Genus: Doliops
- Species: D. animula

Binomial name
- Doliops animula Kriesche, 1940

Species of beetle

Doliops animula is a species of beetle in the family Cerambycidae. It was described by Kriesche in 1940.
