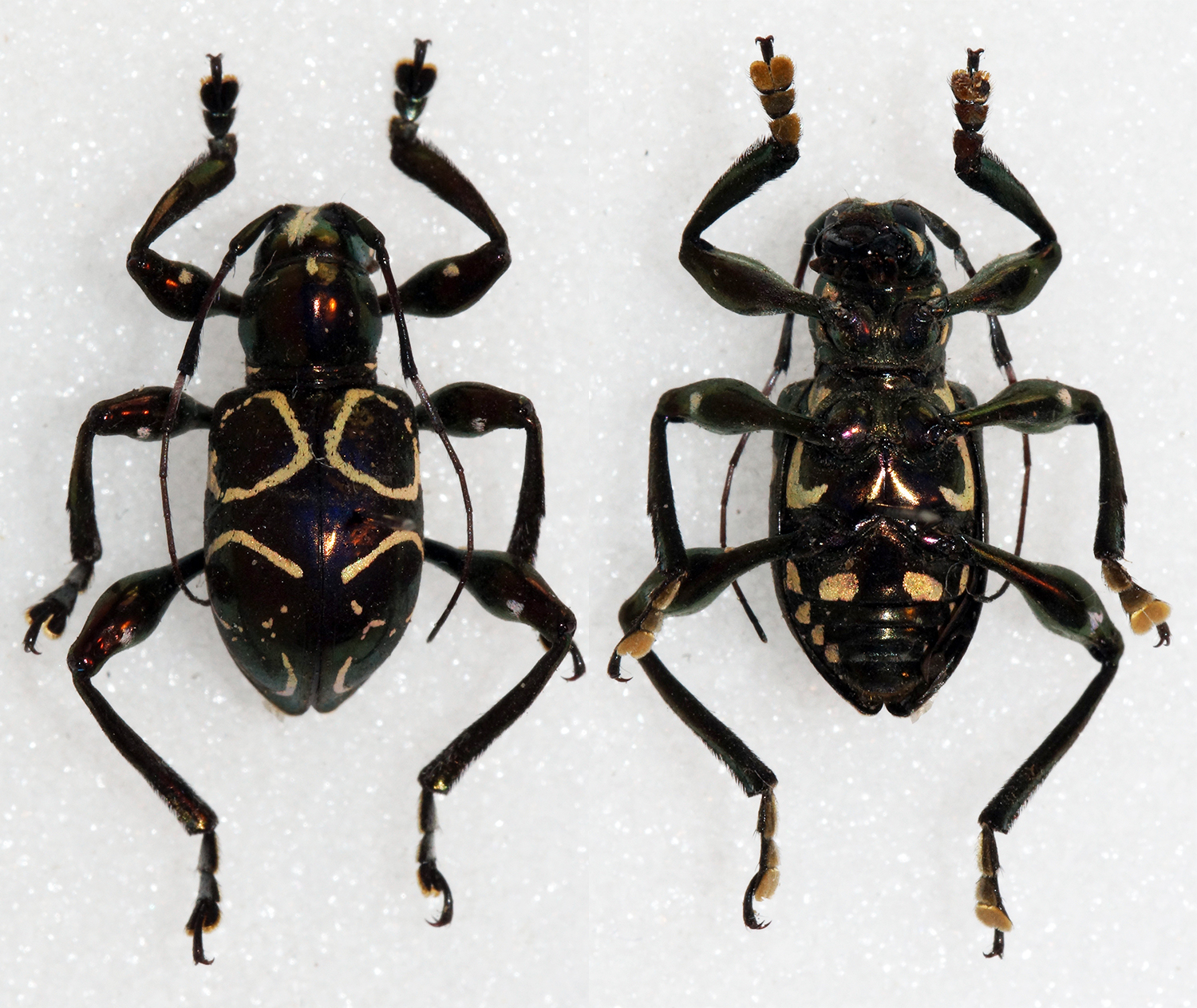

Scientific classification
- Domain: Eukaryota
- Kingdom: Animalia
- Phylum: Arthropoda
- Class: Insecta
- Order: Coleoptera
- Suborder: Polyphaga
- Infraorder: Cucujiformia
- Family: Cerambycidae
- Genus: Doliops
- Species: D. ligata

Binomial name
- Doliops ligata Scwarz, 1929

= Doliops ligata =

Species of beetle

Doliops ligata is a species of beetle in the family Cerambycidae. It was described by Scwarz in 1929.
