= Doliops metallica =

Scientific classification
- Kingdom: Animalia
- Phylum: Arthropoda
- Clade: Pancrustacea
- Class: Insecta
- Order: Coleoptera
- Suborder: Polyphaga
- Infraorder: Cucujiformia
- Family: Cerambycidae
- Genus: Doliops
- Species: D. metallica

Binomial name
- Doliops metallica Breuning, 1938

Species of beetle

Doliops metallica is a species of beetle in the family Cerambycidae. It was described by Breuning in 1938.
