= Doliops similis =

Scientific classification
- Domain: Eukaryota
- Kingdom: Animalia
- Phylum: Arthropoda
- Class: Insecta
- Order: Coleoptera
- Suborder: Polyphaga
- Infraorder: Cucujiformia
- Family: Cerambycidae
- Genus: Doliops
- Species: D. similis

Binomial name
- Doliops similis Miwa & Mitono, 1933

Species of beetle

Doliops similis is a species of beetle in the family Cerambycidae. It was described by Miwa and Mitono in 1933.
