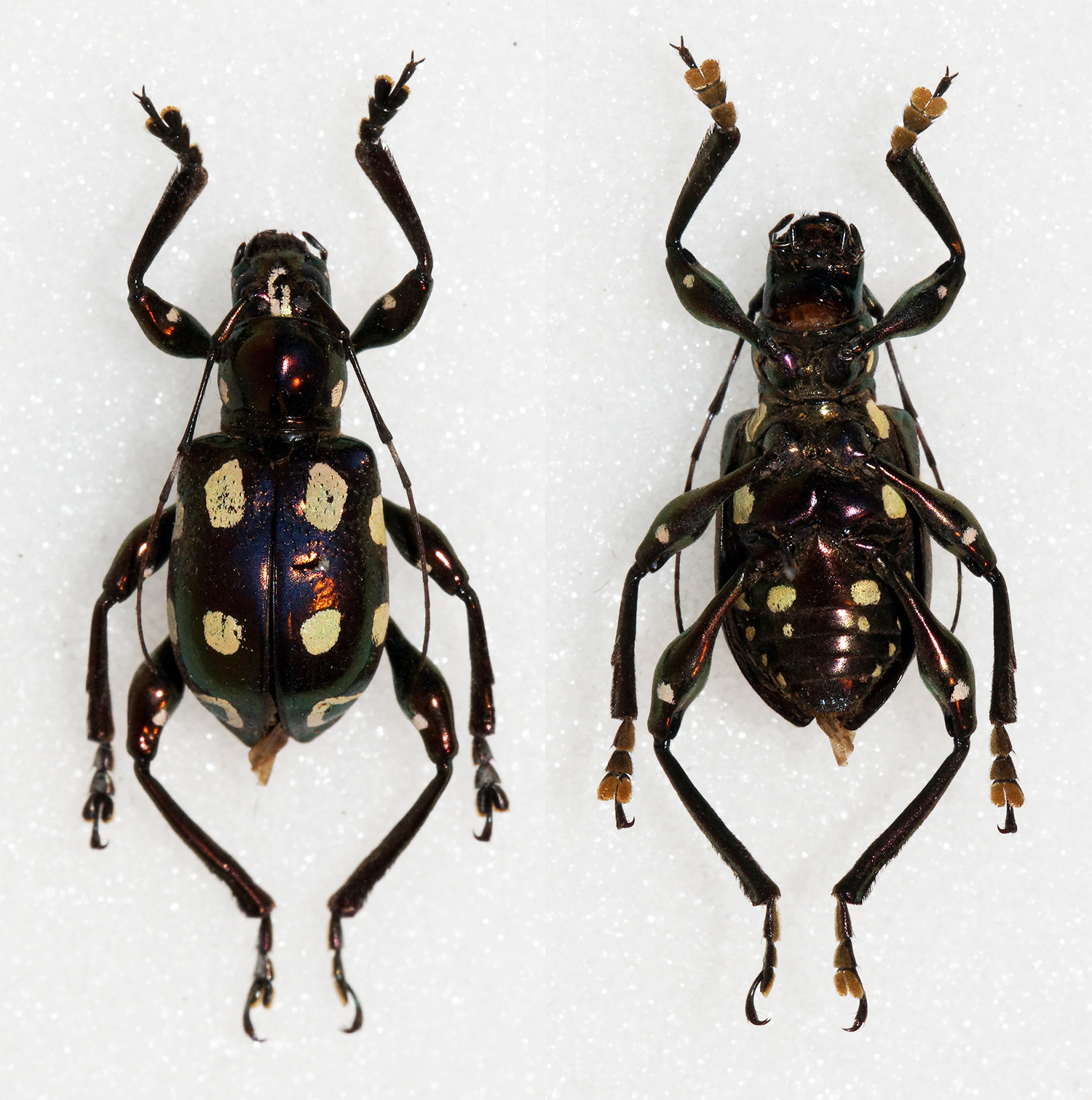

Scientific classification
- Kingdom: Animalia
- Phylum: Arthropoda
- Clade: Pancrustacea
- Class: Insecta
- Order: Coleoptera
- Suborder: Polyphaga
- Infraorder: Cucujiformia
- Family: Cerambycidae
- Genus: Doliops
- Species: D. shavrini

Binomial name
- Doliops shavrini Barševskis, 2013

= Doliops shavrini =

Species of beetle

Doliops shavrini is a species of beetle in the family Cerambycidae. It was described by Barševskis in 2013.
