= Doliops siargaoensis =

Scientific classification
- Kingdom: Animalia
- Phylum: Arthropoda
- Class: Insecta
- Order: Coleoptera
- Suborder: Polyphaga
- Infraorder: Cucujiformia
- Family: Cerambycidae
- Genus: Doliops
- Species: D. siargaoensis

Binomial name
- Doliops siargaoensis Schultze, 1919

Species of beetle

Doliops siargaoensis is a species of beetle in the family Cerambycidae. It was described by Schultze in 1919.
