= Doliops imitator =

Scientific classification
- Kingdom: Animalia
- Phylum: Arthropoda
- Class: Insecta
- Order: Coleoptera
- Suborder: Polyphaga
- Infraorder: Cucujiformia
- Family: Cerambycidae
- Genus: Doliops
- Species: D. imitator

Binomial name
- Doliops imitator Schultze, 1918

Species of beetle

Doliops imitator is a species of beetle in the family Cerambycidae. It was described by Schultze in 1918.
