= Doliops transverselineata =

Scientific classification
- Kingdom: Animalia
- Phylum: Arthropoda
- Class: Insecta
- Order: Coleoptera
- Suborder: Polyphaga
- Infraorder: Cucujiformia
- Family: Cerambycidae
- Genus: Doliops
- Species: D. transverselineata

Binomial name
- Doliops transverselineata Breuning, 1947

Species of beetle

Doliops transverselineata is a species of beetle in the family Cerambycidae. It was described by Breuning in 1947.
