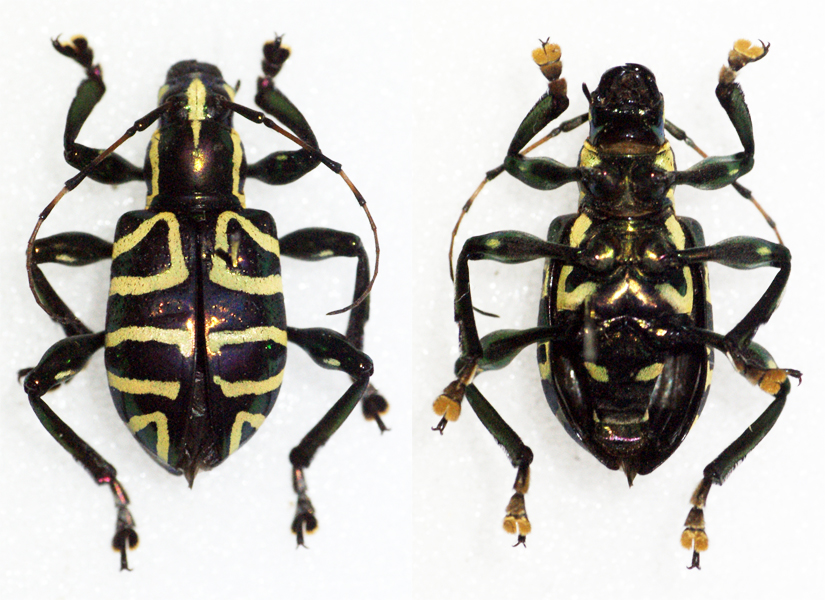
- Doliops geometrica

Scientific classification
- Domain: Eukaryota
- Kingdom: Animalia
- Phylum: Arthropoda
- Class: Insecta
- Order: Coleoptera
- Suborder: Polyphaga
- Infraorder: Cucujiformia
- Family: Cerambycidae
- Tribe: Apomecynini
- Genus: Doliops

= Doliops =

Genus of beetles

Doliops is a genus of beetles in the family Cerambycidae, containing the following species:

- Doliops anichtchenkoi Barševskis, 2013
- Doliops animula Kriesche, 1940
- Doliops bakeri Heller, 1924
- Doliops basilana Heller, 1923
- Doliops bitriangularis Breuning, 1947
- Doliops conspersa Aurivillius, 1927
- Doliops curculionides Waterhouse, 1841
- Doliops du Barševskis, 2021
- Doliops duodecimpunctata Heller, 1923
- Doliops edithae Vives, 2009
- Doliops emmanueli Vives, 2009
- Doliops frosti Schultze, 1923
- Doliops geometrica Waterhouse, 1842
- Doliops gertrudis Hüdepohl, 1990
- Doliops gutowskii Barševskis, 2013
- Doliops helleri Vives, 2009
- Doliops imitator Schultze, 1918
- Doliops ismaeli Vives, 2005
- Doliops johnvictori Vives, 2009
- Doliops ligata Scwarz, 1929
- Doliops metallica Breuning, 1938
- Doliops multifasciata Schultze, 1922
- Doliops octomaculata Breuning, 1928
- Doliops pachyrrhynchoides Heller, 1916
- Doliops savenkovi Barševskis, 2013
- Doliops schultzei Barševskis & Jäger, 2014
- Doliops shavrini Barševskis, 2013
- Doliops siargaoensis Schultze, 1919
- Doliops similis Miwa & Mitono, 1933
- Doliops sklodowskii Barševskis, 2013
- Doliops stradinsi Barševskis, 2013
- Doliops transverselineata Breuning, 1947
- Doliops valainisi Barševskis, 2013
- Doliops villalobosi Heller, 1926
- Doliops viridisignata Breuning, 1947
- Doliops vivesi Barševskis, 2013
