= Doliops savenkovi =

Scientific classification
- Domain: Eukaryota
- Kingdom: Animalia
- Phylum: Arthropoda
- Class: Insecta
- Order: Coleoptera
- Suborder: Polyphaga
- Infraorder: Cucujiformia
- Family: Cerambycidae
- Genus: Doliops
- Species: D. savenkovi

Binomial name
- Doliops savenkovi Barševskis, 2013

Species of beetle

Doliops savenkovi is a species of beetle in the family Cerambycidae. It was described by Barševskis in 2013.
