= Doliops viridisignata =

Scientific classification
- Kingdom: Animalia
- Phylum: Arthropoda
- Class: Insecta
- Order: Coleoptera
- Suborder: Polyphaga
- Infraorder: Cucujiformia
- Family: Cerambycidae
- Genus: Doliops
- Species: D. viridisignata

Binomial name
- Doliops viridisignata Breuning, 1947

Species of beetle

Doliops viridisignata is a species of beetle in the family Cerambycidae. It was described by Breuning in 1947.
