= Bisaltes buquetii =

Scientific classification
- Domain: Eukaryota
- Kingdom: Animalia
- Phylum: Arthropoda
- Class: Insecta
- Order: Coleoptera
- Suborder: Polyphaga
- Infraorder: Cucujiformia
- Family: Cerambycidae
- Genus: Bisaltes
- Species: B. buquetii

Binomial name
- Bisaltes buquetii Thomson, 1868

Species of beetle

Bisaltes buquetii is a species of beetle in the family Cerambycidae. It was described by Thomson in 1868.
