= Bisaltes (beetle) =

Scientific classification
- Kingdom: Animalia
- Phylum: Arthropoda
- Class: Insecta
- Order: Coleoptera
- Suborder: Polyphaga
- Infraorder: Cucujiformia
- Family: Cerambycidae
- Tribe: Apomecynini
- Genus: Bisaltes; Thomson, 1868

Genus of beetles

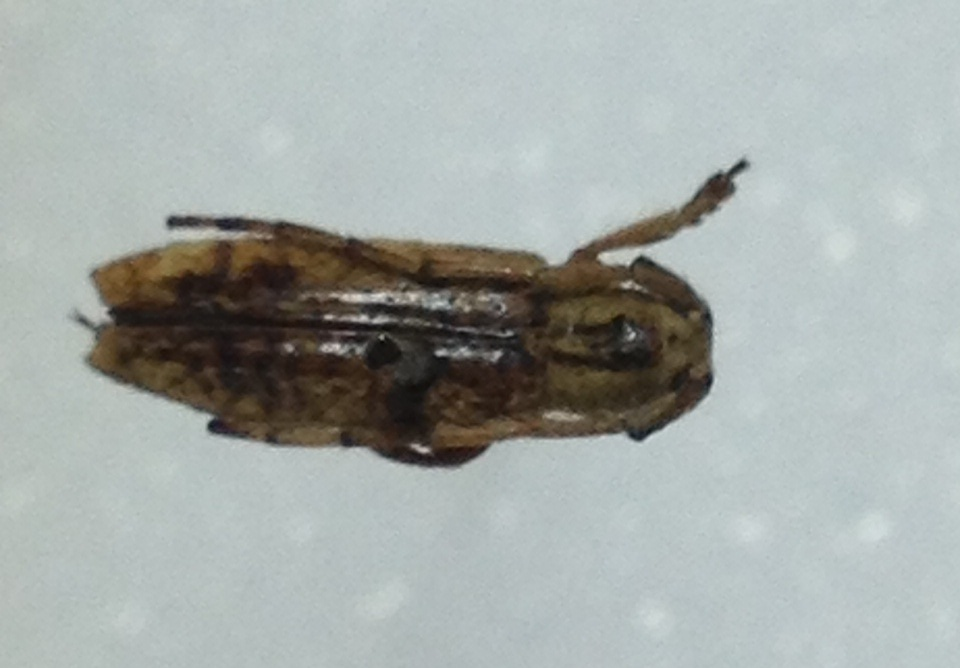

Bisaltes is a genus of beetles in the family Cerambycidae, containing the following species:

- Bisaltes adustus (Burmeister, 1865)
- Bisaltes argentiniensis Breuning, 1971
- Bisaltes bilineellus Breuning, 1939
- Bisaltes bimaculatus Aurivillius, 1904
- Bisaltes brevicornis Breuning, 1939
- Bisaltes buquetii Thomson, 1868
- Bisaltes chilensis Breuning, 1939
- Bisaltes columbianus Breuning, 1971
- Bisaltes elongatus Breuning, 1939
- Bisaltes flaviceps Breuning, 1940
- Bisaltes fuchsi Breuning, 1971
- Bisaltes fuscoapicalis Breuning, 1950
- Bisaltes fuscodiscalis Breuning, 1943
- Bisaltes fuscomarmoratus Breuning, 1966
- Bisaltes montevidensis (Thomson, 1868)
- Bisaltes monticola Tippmann, 1960
- Bisaltes obliquatus Breuning, 1940
- Bisaltes petilus Galileo & Martins, 2009
- Bisaltes picticornis Galileo & Martins, 2003
- Bisaltes pictus Breuning, 1940
- Bisaltes poecilus (Aurivillius, 1900)
- Bisaltes ptericoptoides Breuning, 1942
- Bisaltes pulvereus (Bates, 1866)
- Bisaltes roseiceps Breuning, 1939
- Bisaltes sautierei Chalumeau & Touroult, 2004
- Bisaltes spegazzinii Bruch, 1911
- Bisaltes stramentosus Breuning, 1939
- Bisaltes strandi Breuning, 1940
- Bisaltes subreticulatus Aurivillius, 1920
- Bisaltes taua Galileo & Martins, 2003
- Bisaltes triangularis Breuning, 1940
- Bisaltes unicolor Galileo & Martins, 2003
- Bisaltes uniformis Breuning, 1939
- Bisaltes venezuelensis Breuning, 1943
