= Bisaltes unicolor =

Scientific classification
- Domain: Eukaryota
- Kingdom: Animalia
- Phylum: Arthropoda
- Class: Insecta
- Order: Coleoptera
- Suborder: Polyphaga
- Infraorder: Cucujiformia
- Family: Cerambycidae
- Genus: Bisaltes
- Species: B. unicolor

Binomial name
- Bisaltes unicolor Galileo & Martins, 2003

Species of beetle

Bisaltes unicolor is a species of beetle in the family Cerambycidae. It was described by Galileo and Martins in 2003. It is known from Ecuador; the type locality is in Pichincha.
