= Bisaltes poecilus =

Scientific classification
- Domain: Eukaryota
- Kingdom: Animalia
- Phylum: Arthropoda
- Class: Insecta
- Order: Coleoptera
- Suborder: Polyphaga
- Infraorder: Cucujiformia
- Family: Cerambycidae
- Genus: Bisaltes
- Species: B. poecilus

Binomial name
- Bisaltes poecilus (Aurivillius, 1900)

Species of beetle

Bisaltes poecilus is a species of beetle in the family Cerambycidae. It was described by Per Olof Christopher Aurivillius in 1900.
