= Bisaltes montevidensis =

Scientific classification
- Domain: Eukaryota
- Kingdom: Animalia
- Phylum: Arthropoda
- Class: Insecta
- Order: Coleoptera
- Suborder: Polyphaga
- Infraorder: Cucujiformia
- Family: Cerambycidae
- Genus: Bisaltes
- Species: B. montevidensis

Binomial name
- Bisaltes montevidensis (Thomson, 1868)

Species of beetle

Bisaltes montevidensis is a species of beetle in the family Cerambycidae. It was described by James Thomson in 1868. It is named after the city of Montevideo, Uruguay.
