= Bisaltes spegazzinii =

Scientific classification
- Domain: Eukaryota
- Kingdom: Animalia
- Phylum: Arthropoda
- Class: Insecta
- Order: Coleoptera
- Suborder: Polyphaga
- Infraorder: Cucujiformia
- Family: Cerambycidae
- Genus: Bisaltes
- Species: B. spegazzinii

Binomial name
- Bisaltes spegazzinii Bruch, 1911

Species of beetle

Bisaltes spegazzinii is a species of beetle in the family Cerambycidae. It was described by Bruch in 1911.
