= Bisaltes pulvereus =

Scientific classification
- Domain: Eukaryota
- Kingdom: Animalia
- Phylum: Arthropoda
- Class: Insecta
- Order: Coleoptera
- Suborder: Polyphaga
- Infraorder: Cucujiformia
- Family: Cerambycidae
- Genus: Bisaltes
- Species: B. pulvereus

Binomial name
- Bisaltes pulvereus (Bates, 1866)

Species of beetle

Bisaltes pulvereus is a species of beetle in the family Cerambycidae. It was described by Bates in 1866.
