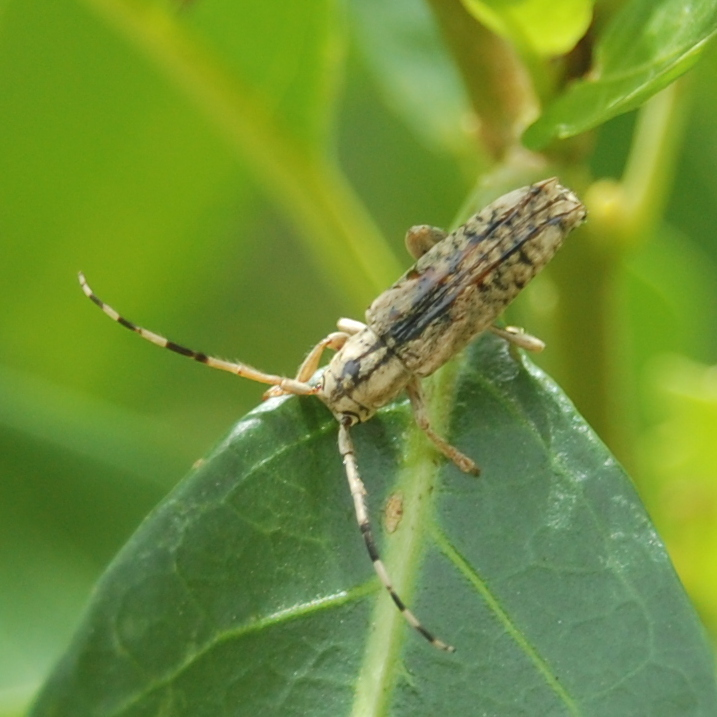

Scientific classification
- Kingdom: Animalia
- Phylum: Arthropoda
- Clade: Pancrustacea
- Class: Insecta
- Order: Coleoptera
- Suborder: Polyphaga
- Infraorder: Cucujiformia
- Family: Cerambycidae
- Genus: Bisaltes
- Species: B. subreticulatus

Binomial name
- Bisaltes subreticulatus Aurivillius, 1920

= Bisaltes subreticulatus =

Species of beetle

Bisaltes subreticulatus is a species of beetle in the family Cerambycidae. It was described by Per Olof Christopher Aurivillius in 1920.
