= Bisaltes adustus =

Scientific classification
- Kingdom: Animalia
- Phylum: Arthropoda
- Class: Insecta
- Order: Coleoptera
- Suborder: Polyphaga
- Infraorder: Cucujiformia
- Family: Cerambycidae
- Genus: Bisaltes
- Species: B. adustus

Binomial name
- Bisaltes adustus (Burmeister, 1865)

Species of beetle

Bisaltes adustus is a species of beetle in the family Cerambycidae. It was described by Hermann Burmeister in 1865.
