= Bisaltes obliquatus =

Scientific classification
- Kingdom: Animalia
- Phylum: Arthropoda
- Class: Insecta
- Order: Coleoptera
- Suborder: Polyphaga
- Infraorder: Cucujiformia
- Family: Cerambycidae
- Genus: Bisaltes
- Species: B. obliquatus

Binomial name
- Bisaltes obliquatus Breuning, 1940

Species of beetle

Bisaltes obliquatus is a species of beetle in the family Cerambycidae. It was described by Breuning in 1940.
