= Bisaltes sautierei =

Scientific classification
- Domain: Eukaryota
- Kingdom: Animalia
- Phylum: Arthropoda
- Class: Insecta
- Order: Coleoptera
- Suborder: Polyphaga
- Infraorder: Cucujiformia
- Family: Cerambycidae
- Genus: Bisaltes
- Species: B. sautierei

Binomial name
- Bisaltes sautierei Chalumeau & Touroult, 2004

Species of beetle

Bisaltes sautierei is a species of beetle in the family Cerambycidae. It was described by Chalumeau and Touroult in 2004.
