= Bisaltes venezuelensis =

Scientific classification
- Kingdom: Animalia
- Phylum: Arthropoda
- Class: Insecta
- Order: Coleoptera
- Suborder: Polyphaga
- Infraorder: Cucujiformia
- Family: Cerambycidae
- Genus: Bisaltes
- Species: B. venezuelensis

Binomial name
- Bisaltes venezuelensis Breuning, 1943

Species of beetle

Bisaltes venezuelensis is a species of beetle in the family Cerambycidae. It was described by Breuning in 1943.
