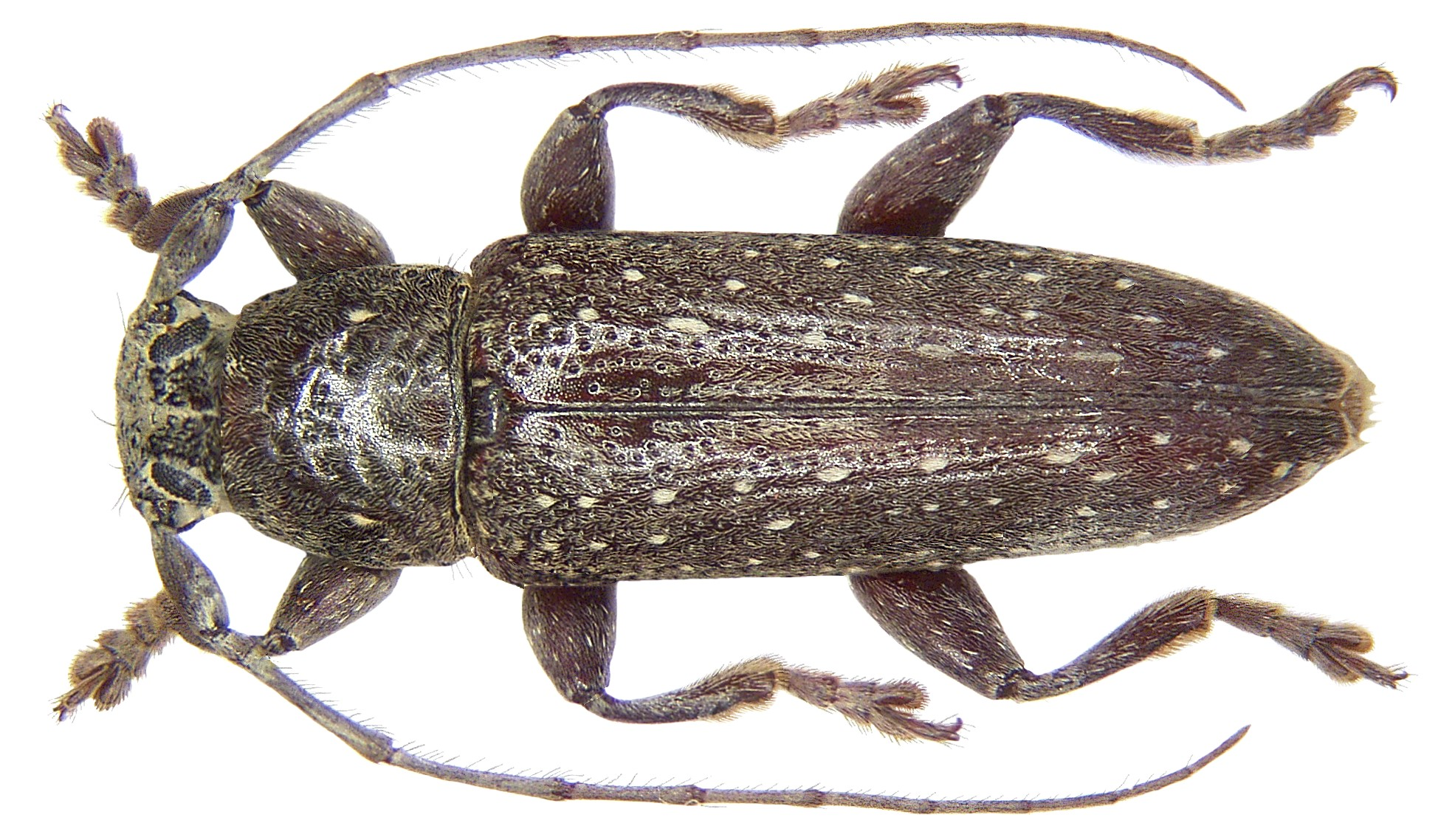

Scientific classification
- Kingdom: Animalia
- Phylum: Arthropoda
- Class: Insecta
- Order: Coleoptera
- Suborder: Polyphaga
- Infraorder: Cucujiformia
- Family: Cerambycidae
- Genus: Ichthyodes
- Species: I. affinis

Binomial name
- Ichthyodes affinis Breuning, 1939

= Ichthyodes affinis =

Species of beetle

Ichthyodes affinis is a species of beetle in the family Cerambycidae. It was described by Breuning in 1939.
