= Ichthyodes szekessyi =

Scientific classification
- Kingdom: Animalia
- Phylum: Arthropoda
- Class: Insecta
- Order: Coleoptera
- Suborder: Polyphaga
- Infraorder: Cucujiformia
- Family: Cerambycidae
- Genus: Ichthyodes
- Species: I. szekessyi

Binomial name
- Ichthyodes szekessyi (Breuning, 1953)

Species of beetle

Ichthyodes szekessyi is a beetle species from the family Cerambycidae. The scientific name of this species was first published in 1953 by Breuning.
