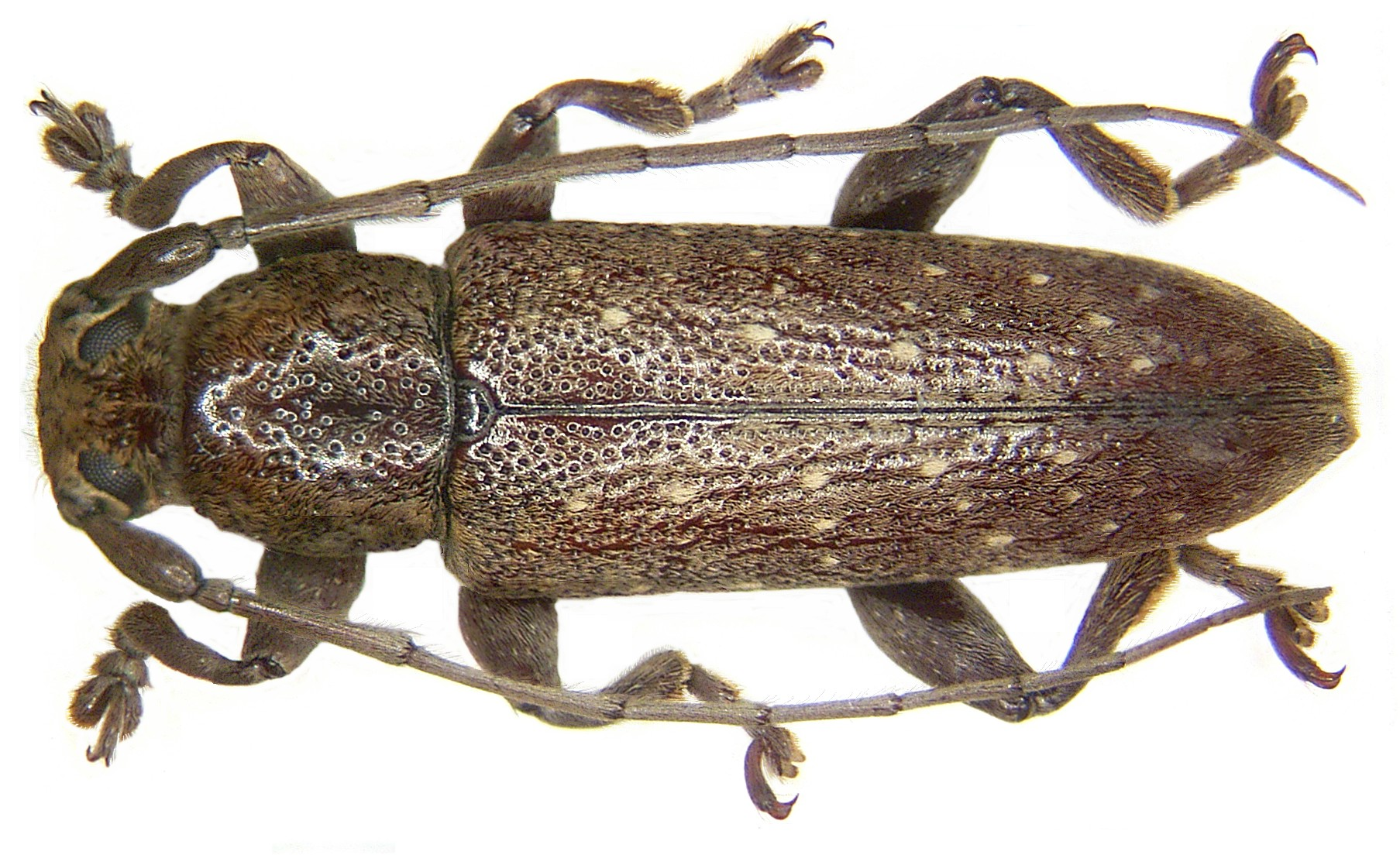

Scientific classification
- Kingdom: Animalia
- Phylum: Arthropoda
- Class: Insecta
- Order: Coleoptera
- Suborder: Polyphaga
- Infraorder: Cucujiformia
- Family: Cerambycidae
- Genus: Ichthyodes
- Species: I. floccosa

Binomial name
- Ichthyodes floccosa (Pascoe, 1867)

= Ichthyodes floccosa =

Species of beetle

Ichthyodes floccosa is a species of beetle in the family Cerambycidae. It was described by Pascoe in 1867.
