= Ichthyodes leucostictica =

Scientific classification
- Kingdom: Animalia
- Phylum: Arthropoda
- Class: Insecta
- Order: Coleoptera
- Suborder: Polyphaga
- Infraorder: Cucujiformia
- Family: Cerambycidae
- Genus: Ichthyodes
- Species: I. leucostictica

Binomial name
- Ichthyodes leucostictica Breuning, 1942

Species of beetle

Ichthyodes leucostictica is a species of beetle in the family Cerambycidae. It was described by Breuning in 1942.
