= Ichthyodes truncata =

Scientific classification
- Kingdom: Animalia
- Phylum: Arthropoda
- Class: Insecta
- Order: Coleoptera
- Suborder: Polyphaga
- Infraorder: Cucujiformia
- Family: Cerambycidae
- Genus: Ichthyodes
- Species: I. truncata

Binomial name
- Ichthyodes truncata (Aurivillius, 1917)

Species of beetle

Ichthyodes truncata is a species of beetle in the family Cerambycidae. It was described by Per Olof Christopher Aurivillius in 1917.
