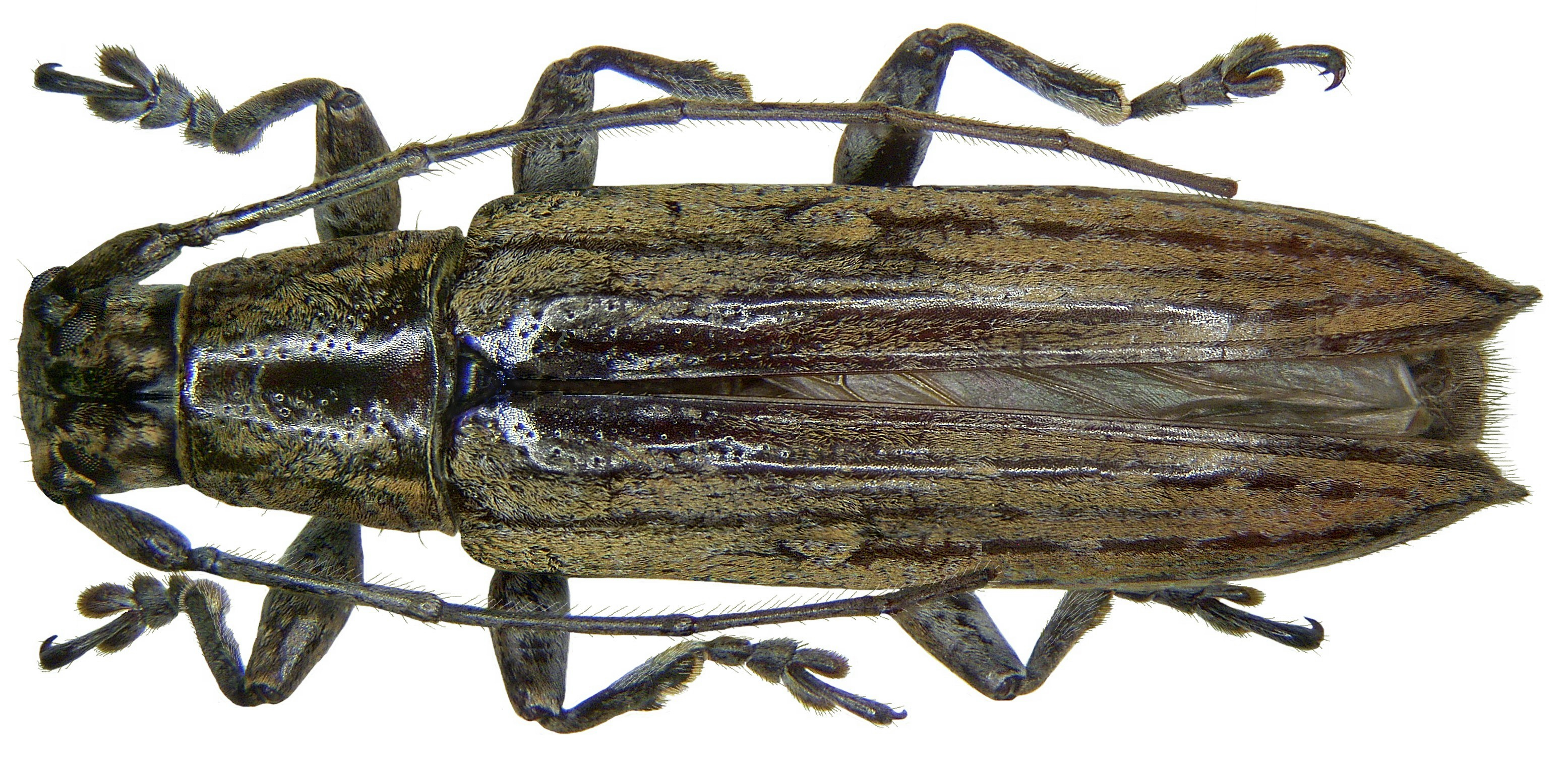
- Ichthyodes biguttula

Scientific classification
- Kingdom: Animalia
- Phylum: Arthropoda
- Class: Insecta
- Order: Coleoptera
- Suborder: Polyphaga
- Infraorder: Cucujiformia
- Family: Cerambycidae
- Subfamily: Lamiinae
- Tribe: Apomecynini
- Genus: Ichthyodes; Newman, 1842

= Ichthyodes =

Genus of beetles

Ichthyodes is a genus of beetles in the family Cerambycidae, containing the following species:

- Ichthyodes affinis Breuning, 1939
- Ichthyodes albovittata Breuning, 1940
- Ichthyodes biguttula Newman, 1842
- Ichthyodes bisignifera (Pascoe, 1867)
- Ichthyodes fergussoni Breuning, 1970
- Ichthyodes floccifera Breuning, 1939
- Ichthyodes floccosa (Pascoe, 1867)
- Ichthyodes jackmani Hüdepohl, 1989
- Ichthyodes kaszabiana Breuning, 1975
- Ichthyodes leucostictica Breuning, 1942
- Ichthyodes longicornis Breuning, 1939
- Ichthyodes neopommeriana Breuning, 1940
- Ichthyodes ochreoguttata Breuning, 1942
- Ichthyodes pseudosybroides Breuning, 1942
- Ichthyodes spinipennis Breuning, 1939
- Ichthyodes sybroides (Pascoe, 1867)
- Ichthyodes szekessyi (Breuning, 1953)
- Ichthyodes trobriandensis Breuning, 1947
- Ichthyodes truncata (Aurivillius, 1917)
