= Ichthyodes jackmani =

Scientific classification
- Kingdom: Animalia
- Phylum: Arthropoda
- Clade: Pancrustacea
- Class: Insecta
- Order: Coleoptera
- Suborder: Polyphaga
- Infraorder: Cucujiformia
- Family: Cerambycidae
- Genus: Ichthyodes
- Species: I. jackmani

Binomial name
- Ichthyodes jackmani Hüdepohl, 1989

Species of beetle

Ichthyodes jackmani is a species of beetle in the family Cerambycidae. It was described by Hüdepohl in 1989.
