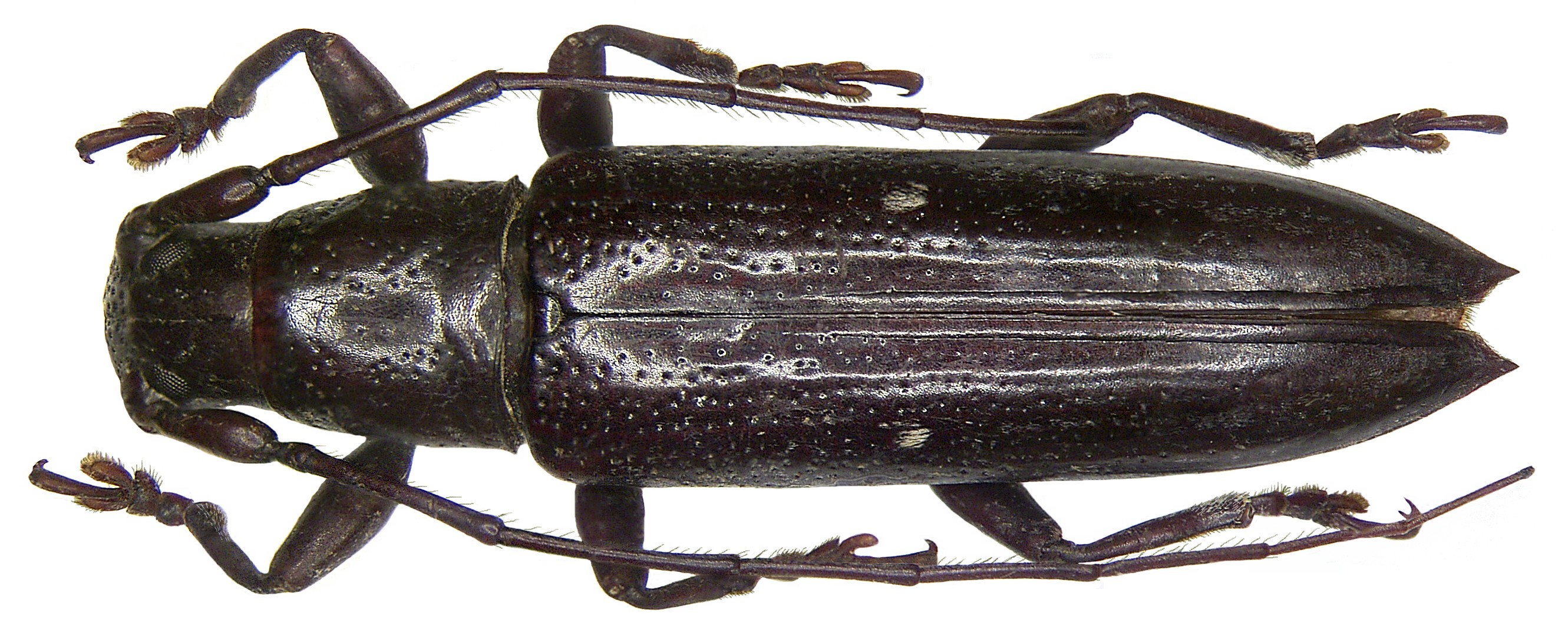

Scientific classification
- Kingdom: Animalia
- Phylum: Arthropoda
- Class: Insecta
- Order: Coleoptera
- Suborder: Polyphaga
- Infraorder: Cucujiformia
- Family: Cerambycidae
- Genus: Ichthyodes
- Species: I. biguttula

Binomial name
- Ichthyodes biguttula Newman, 1842

= Ichthyodes biguttula =

Species of beetle

Ichthyodes biguttula is a species of beetle in the family Cerambycidae. It was described by Newman in 1842.
