= Ichthyodes kaszabiana =

Scientific classification
- Kingdom: Animalia
- Phylum: Arthropoda
- Class: Insecta
- Order: Coleoptera
- Suborder: Polyphaga
- Infraorder: Cucujiformia
- Family: Cerambycidae
- Genus: Ichthyodes
- Species: I. kaszabiana

Binomial name
- Ichthyodes kaszabiana Breuning, 1975

Species of beetle

Ichthyodes kaszabiana is a species of beetle in the family Cerambycidae. It was described by Breuning in 1975.
