= Falsepilysta ochraceomaculata =

Scientific classification
- Domain: Eukaryota
- Kingdom: Animalia
- Phylum: Arthropoda
- Class: Insecta
- Order: Coleoptera
- Suborder: Polyphaga
- Infraorder: Cucujiformia
- Family: Cerambycidae
- Genus: Falsepilysta
- Species: F. ochraceomaculata

Binomial name
- Falsepilysta ochraceomaculata (Schwarzer, 1931)

Synonyms
- Plocia ochraceomaculata Schwarzer, 1931; Falsepilysta vitticollis Breuning, 1940; Mimoplocia affinis Breuning & Villiers, 1983

Species of beetle

Falsepilysta ochraceomaculata is a species of beetle in the family Cerambycidae. It was described by Schwarzer in 1931.
