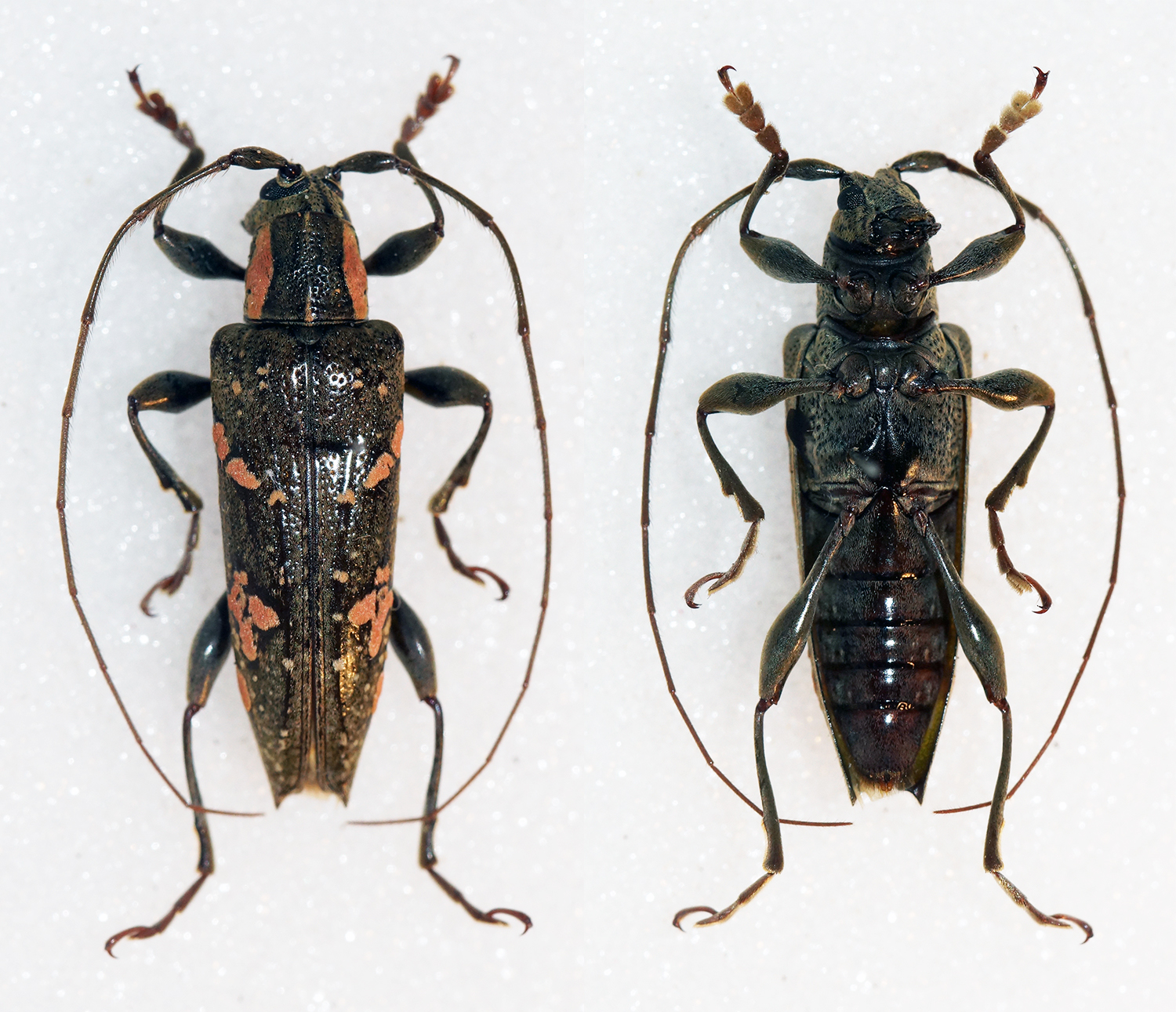

Scientific classification
- Domain: Eukaryota
- Kingdom: Animalia
- Phylum: Arthropoda
- Class: Insecta
- Order: Coleoptera
- Suborder: Polyphaga
- Infraorder: Cucujiformia
- Family: Cerambycidae
- Genus: Falsepilysta
- Species: F. olivacea

Binomial name
- Falsepilysta olivacea (Schwarzer, 1931)

= Falsepilysta olivacea =

Species of beetle

Falsepilysta olivacea is a species of beetle in the family Cerambycidae. It was described by Schwarzer in 1931.
