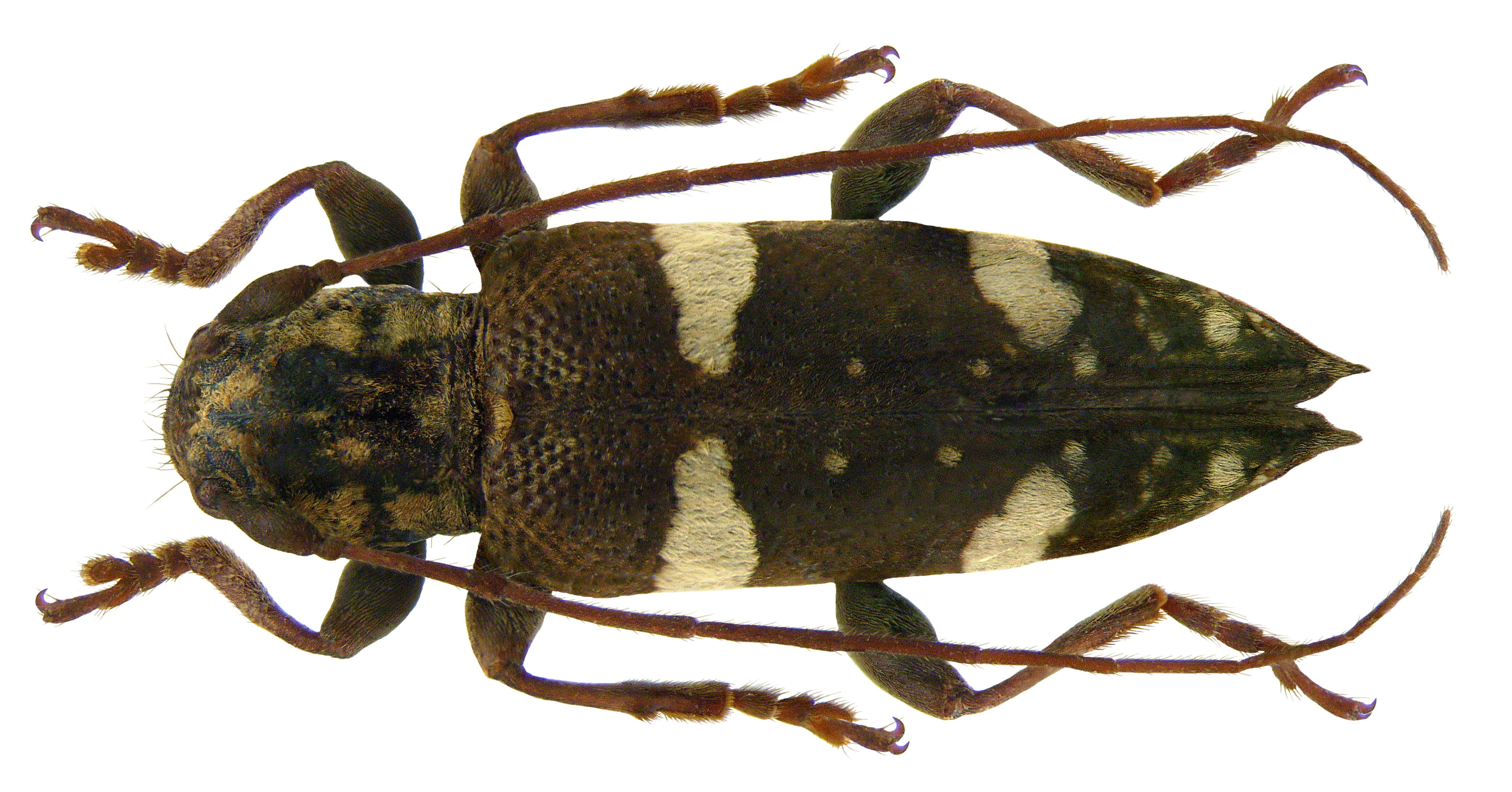

Scientific classification
- Domain: Eukaryota
- Kingdom: Animalia
- Phylum: Arthropoda
- Class: Insecta
- Order: Coleoptera
- Suborder: Polyphaga
- Infraorder: Cucujiformia
- Family: Cerambycidae
- Genus: Falsepilysta
- Species: F. bifasciata

Binomial name
- Falsepilysta bifasciata (Aurivillius, 1923)

= Falsepilysta bifasciata =

Species of beetle

Falsepilysta bifasciata is a species of beetle in the family Cerambycidae. It was described by Per Olof Christopher Aurivillius in 1923.
