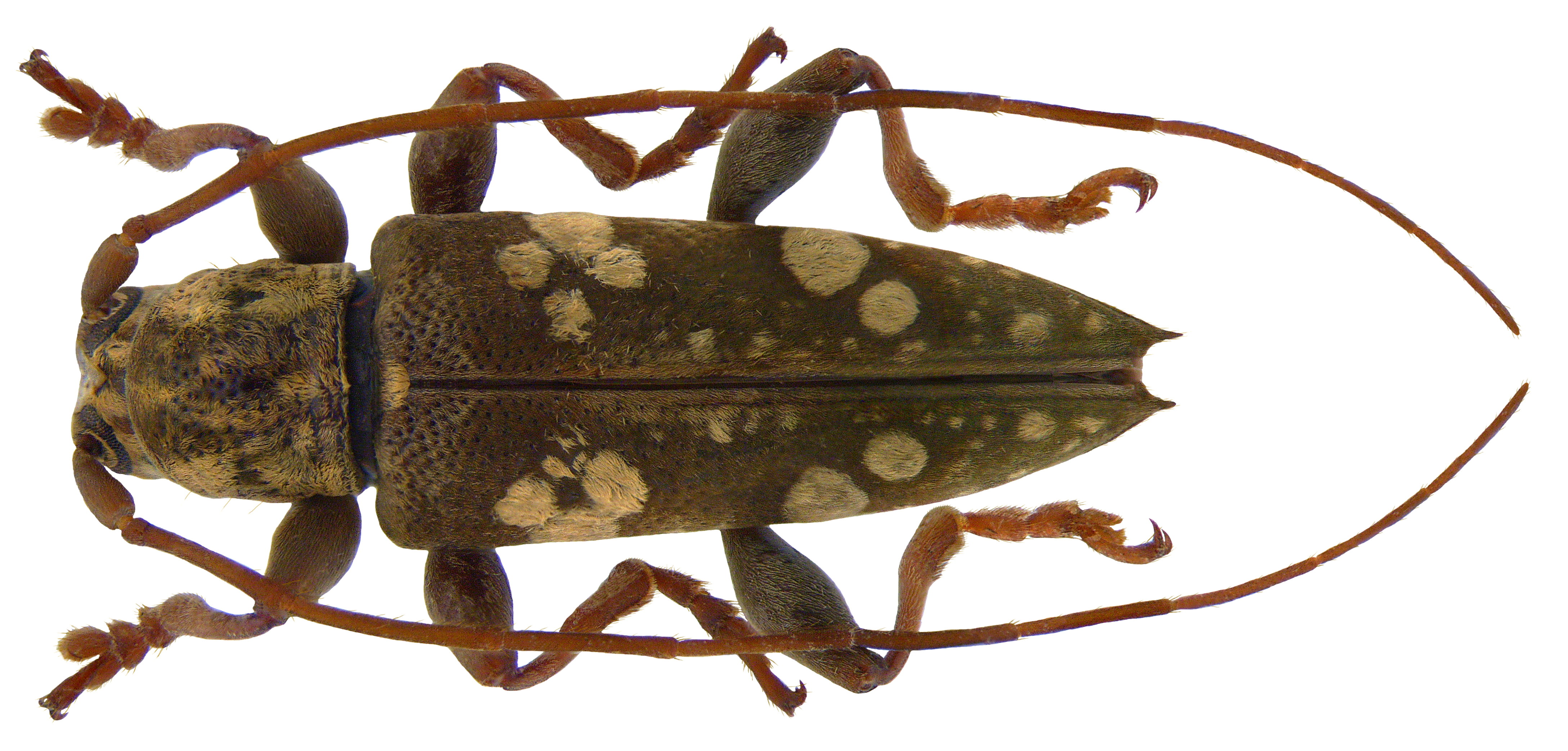
- Falsepilysta roseolata

Scientific classification
- Domain: Eukaryota
- Kingdom: Animalia
- Phylum: Arthropoda
- Class: Insecta
- Order: Coleoptera
- Suborder: Polyphaga
- Infraorder: Cucujiformia
- Family: Cerambycidae
- Tribe: Apomecynini
- Genus: Falsepilysta; Breuning, 1939

Type species
- Epilysta guttata Aurivillius, 1924

= Falsepilysta =

Genus of beetles

Falsepilysta is a genus of beetles in the family Cerambycidae, containing the following species:

- Falsepilysta albostictica Breuning, 1939
- Falsepilysta bifasciata (Aurivillius, 1923)
- Falsepilysta guttata (Aurivillius, 1924)
- Falsepilysta laterimaculata (Heller, 1924)
- Falsepilysta ochraceomaculata (Schwarzer, 1931)
- Falsepilysta olivacea (Schwarzer, 1931)
- Falsepilysta rosselli Breuning, 1982
