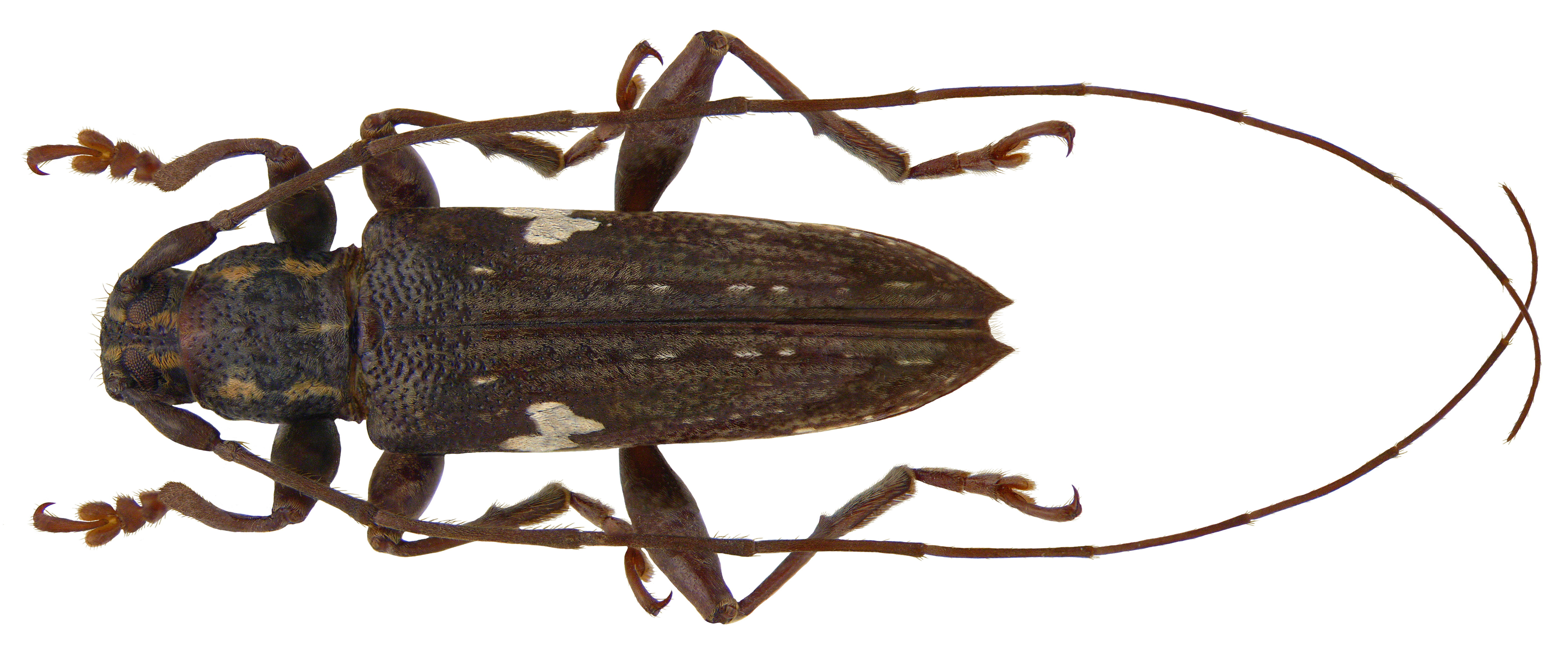

Scientific classification
- Domain: Eukaryota
- Kingdom: Animalia
- Phylum: Arthropoda
- Class: Insecta
- Order: Coleoptera
- Suborder: Polyphaga
- Infraorder: Cucujiformia
- Family: Cerambycidae
- Genus: Falsepilysta
- Species: F. laterimaculata

Binomial name
- Falsepilysta laterimaculata (Heller, 1924)

= Falsepilysta laterimaculata =

Species of beetle

Falsepilysta laterimaculata is a species of beetle in the family Cerambycidae. It was described by Heller in 1924.
