= Amphicnaeia pusilla =

Scientific classification
- Domain: Eukaryota
- Kingdom: Animalia
- Phylum: Arthropoda
- Class: Insecta
- Order: Coleoptera
- Suborder: Polyphaga
- Infraorder: Cucujiformia
- Family: Cerambycidae
- Genus: Amphicnaeia
- Species: A. pusilla

Binomial name
- Amphicnaeia pusilla Bates, 1866

Species of beetle

Amphicnaeia pusilla is a species of beetle in the family Cerambycidae. It was described by Bates in 1866.
