= Amphicnaeia flavescens =

Scientific classification
- Domain: Eukaryota
- Kingdom: Animalia
- Phylum: Arthropoda
- Class: Insecta
- Order: Coleoptera
- Suborder: Polyphaga
- Infraorder: Cucujiformia
- Family: Cerambycidae
- Genus: Amphicnaeia
- Species: A. flavescens

Binomial name
- Amphicnaeia flavescens Martins & Galileo, 1999

Species of beetle

Amphicnaeia flavescens is a species of beetle in the family Cerambycidae. It was described by Martins and Galileo in 1999.
