= Amphicnaeia lineata =

Scientific classification
- Kingdom: Animalia
- Phylum: Arthropoda
- Clade: Pancrustacea
- Class: Insecta
- Order: Coleoptera
- Suborder: Polyphaga
- Infraorder: Cucujiformia
- Family: Cerambycidae
- Genus: Amphicnaeia
- Species: A. lineata

Binomial name
- Amphicnaeia lineata Bates, 1866

Species of beetle

Amphicnaeia lineata is a species of beetle in the family Cerambycidae. It was described by Bates in 1866. It is found in Panama, French Guiana, Brazil (Amazonas, Pará, Rondônia, Minas Gerais, Rio de Janeiro, São Paulo, Paraná, Santa Catarina, Rio Grande do Sul), Peru, Paraguay and Bolivia (Cochabamba).
