= Amphicnaeia apicalis =

Scientific classification
- Domain: Eukaryota
- Kingdom: Animalia
- Phylum: Arthropoda
- Class: Insecta
- Order: Coleoptera
- Suborder: Polyphaga
- Infraorder: Cucujiformia
- Family: Cerambycidae
- Genus: Amphicnaeia
- Species: A. apicalis

Binomial name
- Amphicnaeia apicalis Melzer, 1933

Species of beetle

Amphicnaeia apicalis is a species of beetle in the family Cerambycidae. It was described by Melzer in 1933.
