= Amphicnaeia interrupta =

Scientific classification
- Kingdom: Animalia
- Phylum: Arthropoda
- Clade: Pancrustacea
- Class: Insecta
- Order: Coleoptera
- Suborder: Polyphaga
- Infraorder: Cucujiformia
- Family: Cerambycidae
- Genus: Amphicnaeia
- Species: A. interrupta

Binomial name
- Amphicnaeia interrupta Galileo & Martins, 2003

Species of beetle

Amphicnaeia interrupta is a species of beetle in the family Cerambycidae, first described in 2003.
