= Amphicnaeia pretiosa =

Scientific classification
- Domain: Eukaryota
- Kingdom: Animalia
- Phylum: Arthropoda
- Class: Insecta
- Order: Coleoptera
- Suborder: Polyphaga
- Infraorder: Cucujiformia
- Family: Cerambycidae
- Genus: Amphicnaeia
- Species: A. pretiosa

Binomial name
- Amphicnaeia pretiosa Galileo & Martins, 2001

Species of beetle

Amphicnaeia pretiosa is a species of beetle in the family Cerambycidae. It was described by Galileo and Martins in 2001.
