= Amphicnaeia =

Scientific classification
- Domain: Eukaryota
- Kingdom: Animalia
- Phylum: Arthropoda
- Class: Insecta
- Order: Coleoptera
- Suborder: Polyphaga
- Infraorder: Cucujiformia
- Family: Cerambycidae
- Tribe: Apomecynini
- Genus: Amphicnaeia; Bates, 1866

Synonyms
- Aesylacris Thomson 1868

Genus of beetles

Amphicnaeia is a genus of beetles in the family Cerambycidae, containing the following species:

- Amphicnaeia albovittata Breuning, 1971
- Amphicnaeia amicusbira Galileo, 2015
- Amphicnaeia antennata Galileo & Martins, 2001
- Amphicnaeia apicalis Melzer, 1933
- Amphicnaeia armata Galileo & Martins, 2001
- Amphicnaeia bezarki Wappes, Santos-Silva & Galileo, 2019
- Amphicnaeia birai Galileo, 2015
- Amphicnaeia bivittata Melzer, 1933
- Amphicnaeia brevivittis Bates, 1872
- Amphicnaeia crustulata Bates, 1872
- Amphicnaeia distincta Bezark, Santos-Silva & Devesa, 2020
- Amphicnaeia flavescens Martins & Galileo, 1999
- Amphicnaeia flavofemorata Breuning, 1940
- Amphicnaeia flavolineata Breuning, 1943
- Amphicnaeia flavovittata Breuning, 1940
- Amphicnaeia distincta Wappes, Santos-Silva & Galileo, 2019
- Amphicnaeia gouverneuri Vitali, 2021
- Amphicnaeia interrupta Galileo & Martins, 2003
- Amphicnaeia lepida Melzer, 1933
- Amphicnaeia lineata Bates, 1866
- Amphicnaeia lineolata Galileo & Martins, 2011
- Amphicnaeia lyctoides Bates, 1866
- Amphicnaeia martinsi Galileo, 2015
- Amphicnaeia nigra Galileo & Martins, 2001
- Amphicnaeia odettae Bezark, Santos-Silva & Devesa, 2020
- Amphicnaeia panamensis Wappes, Santos-Silva & Galileo, 2019
- Amphicnaeia piriana Martins & Galileo, 2001
- Amphicnaeia pretiosa Galileo & Martins, 2001
- Amphicnaeia pusilla Bates, 1866
- Amphicnaeia quadrifasciata Nascimento & Santos-Silva, 2018
- Amphicnaeia quinquevittata Bates, 1885
- Amphicnaeia rileyi Wappes, Santos-Silva & Galileo, 2019
- Amphicnaeia sexnotata Melzer, 1933
- Amphicnaeia strandi Breuning, 1942
- Amphicnaeia tate Galileo & Martins, 2001
- Amphicnaeia trivitticollis Breuning, 1961
- Amphicnaeia ubirajarai Galileo, 2015
- Amphicnaeia villosula (Thomson, 1868)
- Amphicnaeia vitticollis Breuning, 1940
- Amphicnaeia zonata Martins & Galileo, 2001
