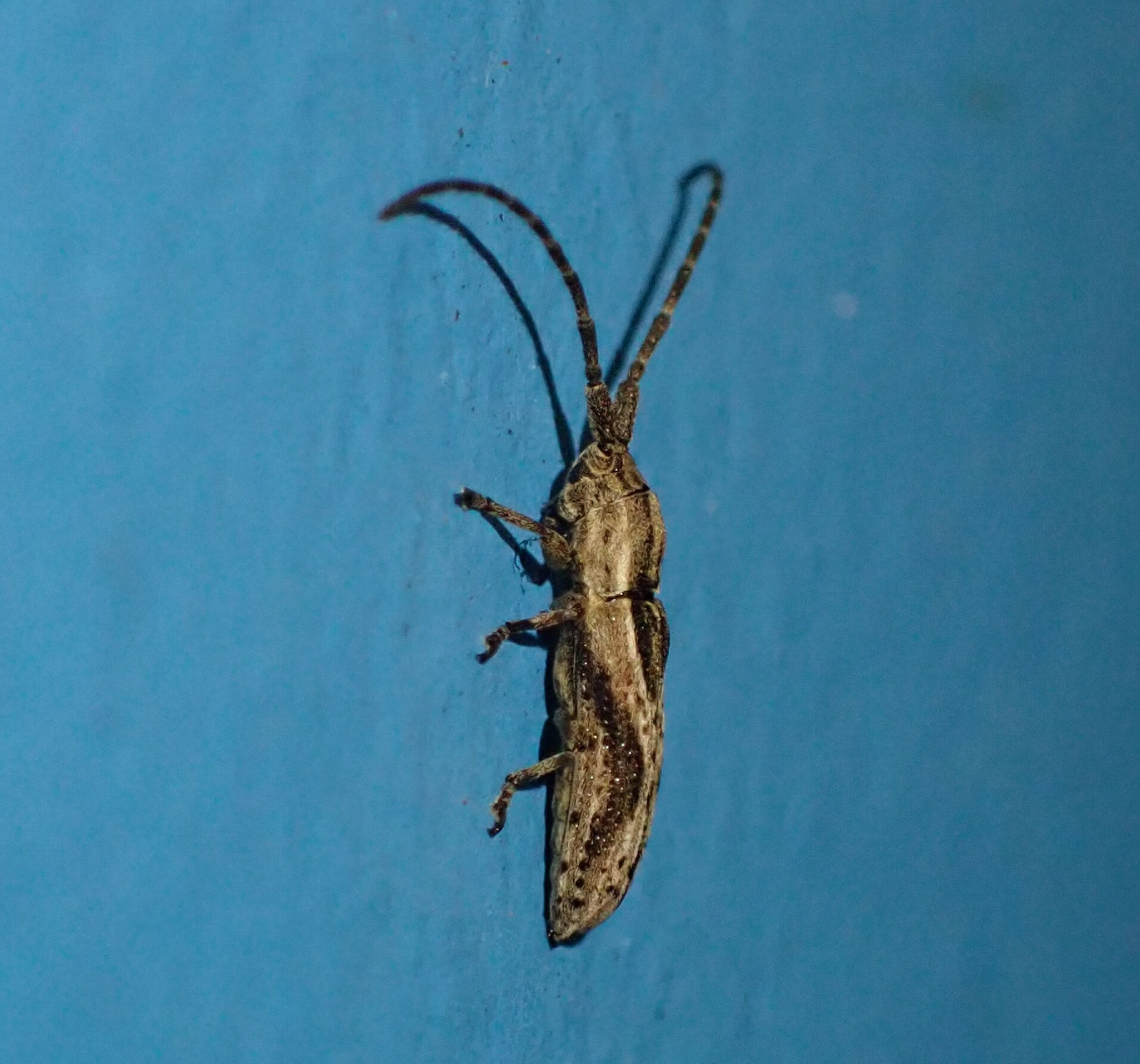

Scientific classification
- Domain: Eukaryota
- Kingdom: Animalia
- Phylum: Arthropoda
- Class: Insecta
- Order: Coleoptera
- Suborder: Polyphaga
- Infraorder: Cucujiformia
- Family: Cerambycidae
- Genus: Bebelis
- Species: B. lignosa

Binomial name
- Bebelis lignosa Thomson, 1864

= Bebelis lignosa =

Species of beetle

Bebelis lignosa is a species of beetle in the family Cerambycidae that was first described by Thomson in 1864. Bebelis lignosa is found in South America and Central America. They have a brown pattern on their back.
