= Bebelis maculata =

Scientific classification
- Domain: Eukaryota
- Kingdom: Animalia
- Phylum: Arthropoda
- Class: Insecta
- Order: Coleoptera
- Suborder: Polyphaga
- Infraorder: Cucujiformia
- Family: Cerambycidae
- Genus: Bebelis
- Species: B. maculata

Binomial name
- Bebelis maculata Martins & Galileo, 1999

Species of beetle

Bebelis maculata is a species of beetle in the family Cerambycidae. It was described by Martins and Galileo in 1999.
