= Bebelis mexicana =

Scientific classification
- Domain: Eukaryota
- Kingdom: Animalia
- Phylum: Arthropoda
- Class: Insecta
- Order: Coleoptera
- Suborder: Polyphaga
- Infraorder: Cucujiformia
- Family: Cerambycidae
- Genus: Bebelis
- Species: B. mexicana

Binomial name
- Bebelis mexicana (Bates, 1885)

Species of beetle

Bebelis mexicana is a species of beetle in the family Cerambycidae. It was described by Bates in 1885.
