= Bebelis =

Scientific classification
- Domain: Eukaryota
- Kingdom: Animalia
- Phylum: Arthropoda
- Class: Insecta
- Order: Coleoptera
- Suborder: Polyphaga
- Infraorder: Cucujiformia
- Family: Cerambycidae
- Tribe: Apomecynini
- Genus: Bebelis; Thomson, 1864

Genus of beetles

Bebelis is a genus of beetles in the family Cerambycidae, first described by James Thomson in 1864.

== Species ==
Bebelis contains the following species:

- Bebelis acuta Pascoe, 1875
- Bebelis aurulenta (Belon, 1903)
- Bebelis coenosa (Bates, 1866)
- Bebelis compta Galileo & Martins, 2006
- Bebelis cuprina (Belon, 1903)
- Bebelis divaricata (Fisher, 1947)
- Bebelis elongata (Lameere, 1893)
- Bebelis fasciata (Fisher, 1947)
- Bebelis furcula (Bates, 1880)
- Bebelis imitatrix Santos-Silva, 2022
- Bebelis leo Monne & Monne, 2009
- Bebelis lignea (Bates, 1866)
- Bebelis lignosa Thomson, 1864
- Bebelis longipennis (Bates, 1885)
- Bebelis maculata Martins & Galileo, 1999
- Bebelis mexicana (Bates, 1885)
- Bebelis modesta (Belon, 1903)
- Bebelis nearnsi Santos-Silva, 2022
- Bebelis obliquata Breuning, 1940
- Bebelis occulta (Bates, 1866)
- Bebelis parana Santos-Silva, 2022
- Bebelis parva (Fisher, 1938)
- Bebelis picta Pascoe, 1875
- Bebelis pseudolignosa Breuning, 1942
- Bebelis puncticollis (Fisher, 1947)
- Bebelis skillmani Santos-Silva, 2022
- Bebelis tagua Galileo & Martins, 2006
- Bebelis tinga Santos-Silva, 2022
- Bebelis wappesi Santos-Silva, 2022
- Bebelis zeteki (Fisher, 1947)
