= Bebelis aurulenta =

Scientific classification
- Domain: Eukaryota
- Kingdom: Animalia
- Phylum: Arthropoda
- Class: Insecta
- Order: Coleoptera
- Suborder: Polyphaga
- Infraorder: Cucujiformia
- Family: Cerambycidae
- Genus: Bebelis
- Species: B. aurulenta

Binomial name
- Bebelis aurulenta (Belon, 1903)

Species of beetle

Bebelis aurulenta is a species of beetle in the family Cerambycidae. It was described by Belon in 1903.
