= Bebelis fasciata =

Scientific classification
- Domain: Eukaryota
- Kingdom: Animalia
- Phylum: Arthropoda
- Class: Insecta
- Order: Coleoptera
- Suborder: Polyphaga
- Infraorder: Cucujiformia
- Family: Cerambycidae
- Genus: Bebelis
- Species: B. fasciata

Binomial name
- Bebelis fasciata (Fisher, 1947)

Species of beetle

Bebelis fasciata is a species of beetle in the family Cerambycidae. It was described by Fisher in 1947.
