= Bebelis picta =

Scientific classification
- Domain: Eukaryota
- Kingdom: Animalia
- Phylum: Arthropoda
- Class: Insecta
- Order: Coleoptera
- Suborder: Polyphaga
- Infraorder: Cucujiformia
- Family: Cerambycidae
- Genus: Bebelis
- Species: B. picta

Binomial name
- Bebelis picta Pascoe, 1875

Species of beetle

Bebelis picta is a species of beetle in the family Cerambycidae. It was described by Francis Polkinghorne Pascoe in 1875.
