= Bebelis leo =

Scientific classification
- Domain: Eukaryota
- Kingdom: Animalia
- Phylum: Arthropoda
- Class: Insecta
- Order: Coleoptera
- Suborder: Polyphaga
- Infraorder: Cucujiformia
- Family: Cerambycidae
- Genus: Bebelis
- Species: B. leo

Binomial name
- Bebelis leo Monne & Monne, 2009

Species of beetle

Bebelis leo is a species of beetle in the family Cerambycidae. It was described by Monne and Monne in 2009.
