= Bebelis tagua =

Scientific classification
- Domain: Eukaryota
- Kingdom: Animalia
- Phylum: Arthropoda
- Class: Insecta
- Order: Coleoptera
- Suborder: Polyphaga
- Infraorder: Cucujiformia
- Family: Cerambycidae
- Genus: Bebelis
- Species: B. tagua

Binomial name
- Bebelis tagua Galileo & Martins, 2006

Species of beetle

Bebelis tagua is a species of beetle in the family Cerambycidae. It was described by Galileo and Martins in 2006.
