= Bebelis elongata =

Scientific classification
- Domain: Eukaryota
- Kingdom: Animalia
- Phylum: Arthropoda
- Class: Insecta
- Order: Coleoptera
- Suborder: Polyphaga
- Infraorder: Cucujiformia
- Family: Cerambycidae
- Genus: Bebelis
- Species: B. elongata

Binomial name
- Bebelis elongata (Lameere, 1893)

Species of beetle

Bebelis elongata is a species of beetle in the family Cerambycidae. It was described by Lameere in 1893.
