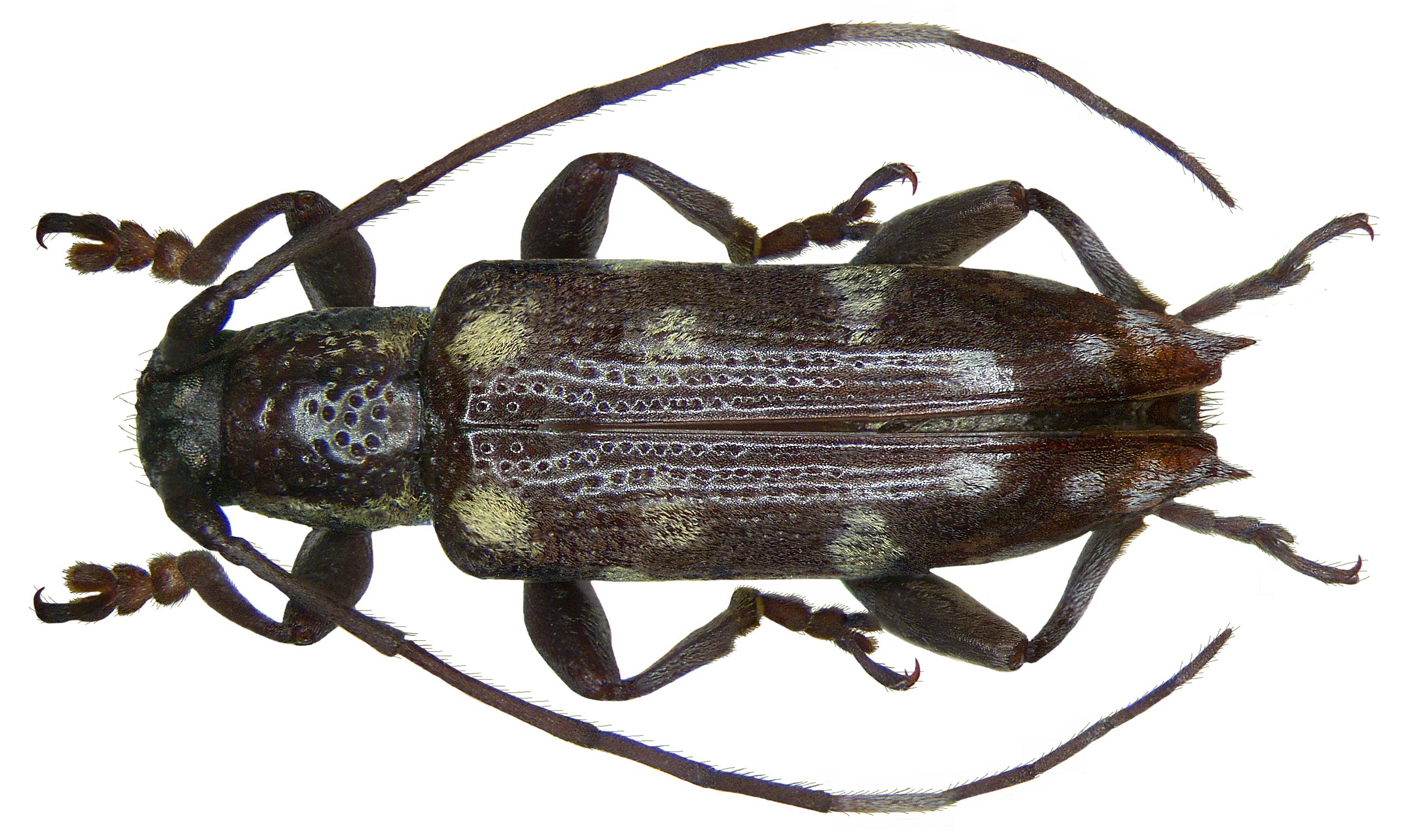
- Mimoplocia diverseguttata

Scientific classification
- Kingdom: Animalia
- Phylum: Arthropoda
- Class: Insecta
- Order: Coleoptera
- Suborder: Polyphaga
- Infraorder: Cucujiformia
- Family: Cerambycidae
- Tribe: Apomecynini
- Genus: Plocia; Newman, 1842

Synonyms
- Mimoplocia Breuning, 1939

= Plocia =

Genus of beetles

Plocia is a genus of beetle in the family Cerambycidae.

== Species ==
- Plocia diverseguttata (Heller, 1924)
- Plocia mixta Newman, 1842
- Plocia notata Newman, 1842
- Plocia splendens (Hüdepohl, 1995)
