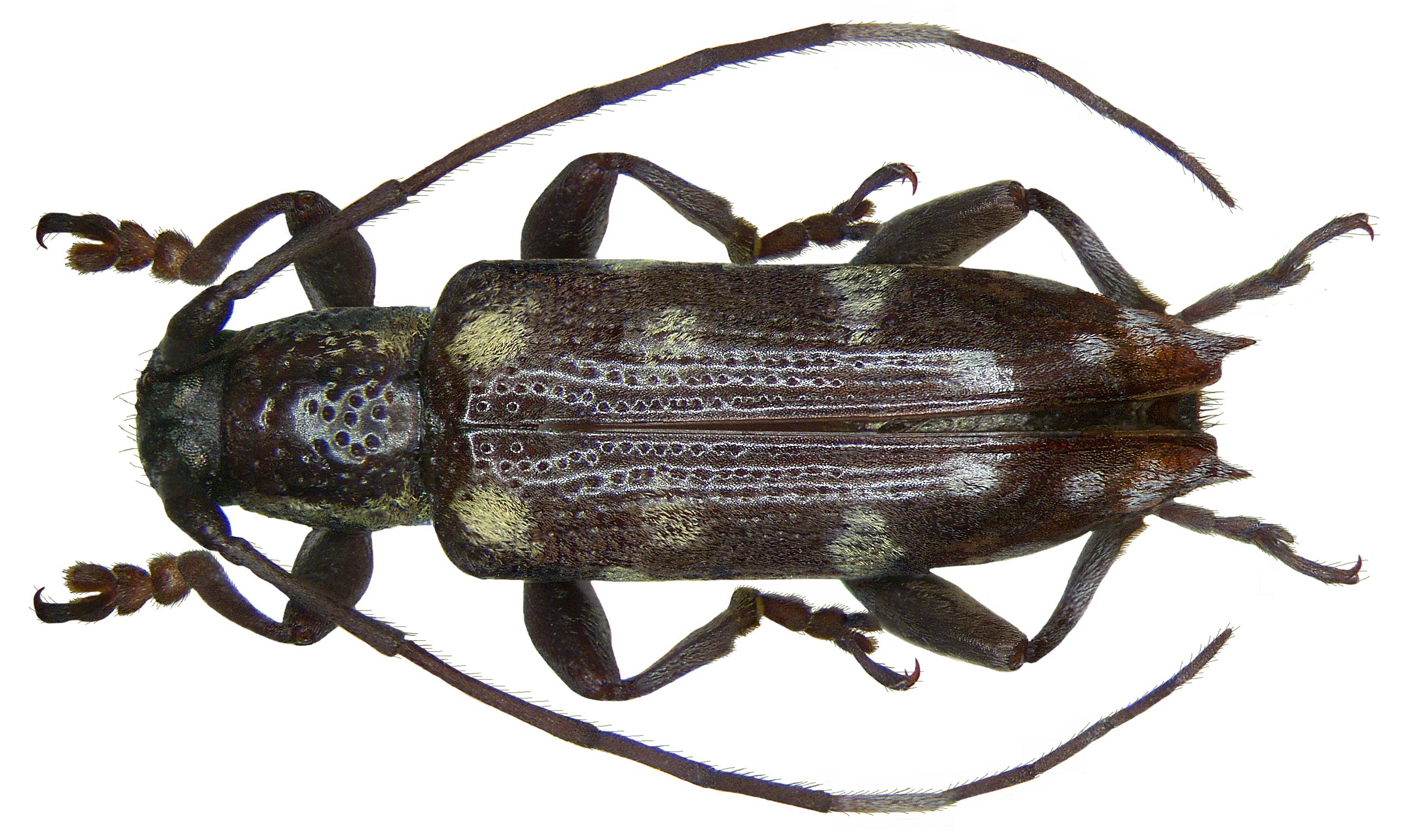

Scientific classification
- Kingdom: Animalia
- Phylum: Arthropoda
- Class: Insecta
- Order: Coleoptera
- Suborder: Polyphaga
- Infraorder: Cucujiformia
- Family: Cerambycidae
- Genus: Plocia
- Species: P. diverseguttata

Binomial name
- Plocia diverseguttata Heller, 1924

Synonyms
- Mimoplocia diverseguttata (Heller, 1924)

= Plocia diverseguttata =

Species of beetle

Plocia diverseguttata is a species of beetle in the family Cerambycidae. It was described by Heller in 1924.
