= Plociella sybroides =

Scientific classification
- Domain: Eukaryota
- Kingdom: Animalia
- Phylum: Arthropoda
- Class: Insecta
- Order: Coleoptera
- Suborder: Polyphaga
- Infraorder: Cucujiformia
- Family: Cerambycidae
- Genus: Plociella
- Species: P. sybroides

Binomial name
- Plociella sybroides (Schwarzer, 1931)

Synonyms
- Plocia sybroides Schwarzer, 1931; Sybroplocia sybroides (Schwarzer, 1931)

Species of beetles

Plociella sybroides is a species of beetle in the family Cerambycidae. It was described by Schwarzer in 1931.
