= Plocia splendens =

Scientific classification
- Kingdom: Animalia
- Phylum: Arthropoda
- Class: Insecta
- Order: Coleoptera
- Suborder: Polyphaga
- Infraorder: Cucujiformia
- Family: Cerambycidae
- Genus: Plocia
- Species: P. splendens

Binomial name
- Plocia splendens (Hüdepohl, 1995)

Synonyms
- Mimoplocia splendens Hüdepohl, 1995

Species of beetle

Plocia splendens is a species of beetle in the family Cerambycidae. It was described by Hüdepohl in 1995.
