= Plocia notata =

Scientific classification
- Domain: Eukaryota
- Kingdom: Animalia
- Phylum: Arthropoda
- Class: Insecta
- Order: Coleoptera
- Suborder: Polyphaga
- Infraorder: Cucujiformia
- Family: Cerambycidae
- Genus: Plocia
- Species: P. notata

Binomial name
- Plocia notata Newman, 1842

Synonyms
- Mimoplocia notata (Newman, 1842); Epaphra albicornis Heyrovský, 1935

Species of beetle

Plocia notata is a species of beetle in the family Cerambycidae. It was described by Newman in 1842.
