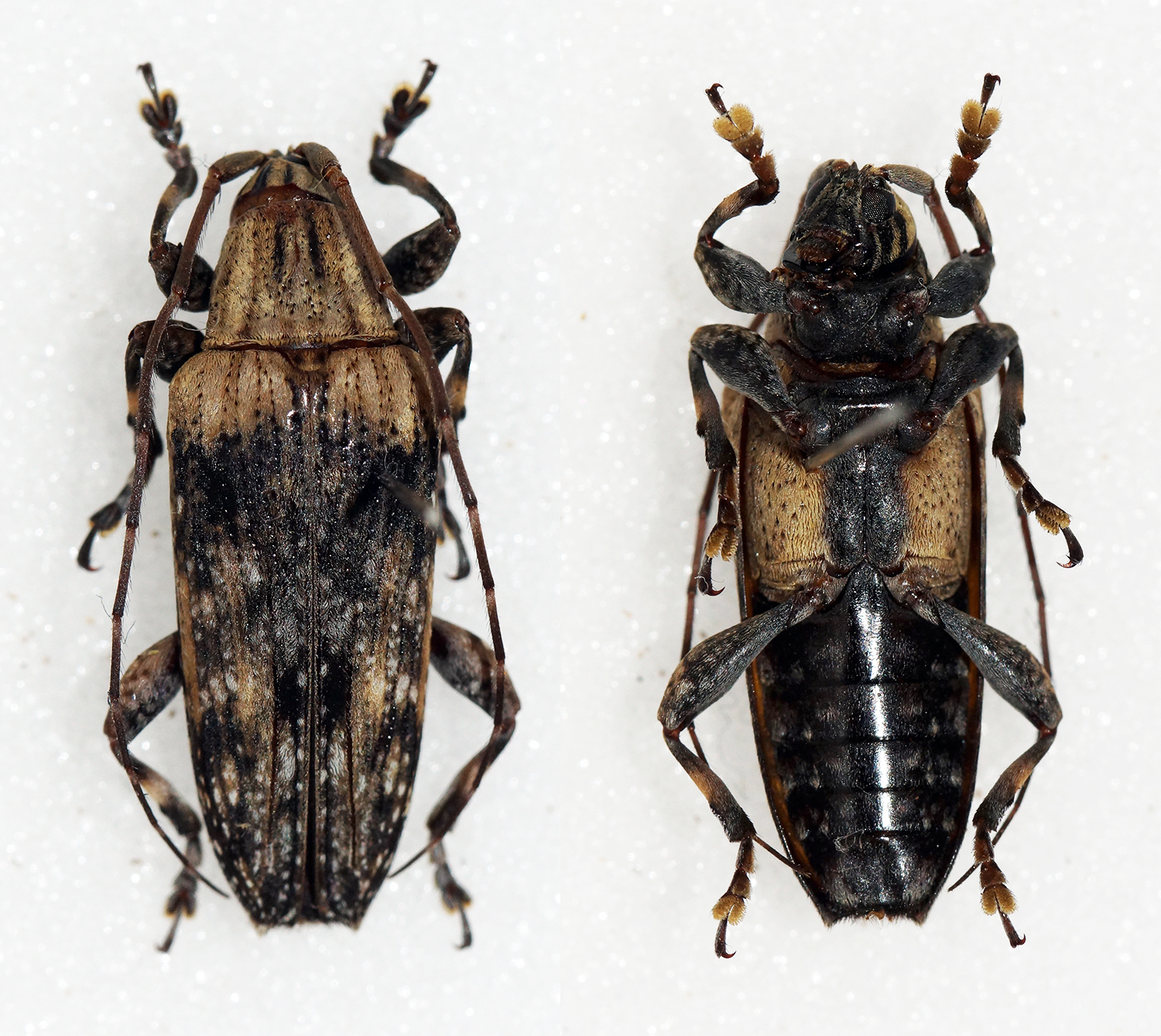

Scientific classification
- Kingdom: Animalia
- Phylum: Arthropoda
- Class: Insecta
- Order: Coleoptera
- Suborder: Polyphaga
- Infraorder: Cucujiformia
- Family: Cerambycidae
- Tribe: Apomecynini
- Genus: Plociella; Breuning, 1959

Synonyms
- Sybroplocia Breuning, 1959

= Plociella =

Genus of beetles

Plociella is a genus of beetles in the family Cerambycidae, containing the following species:

- Plociella mixta (Newman, 1842)
- Plociella sybroides (Schwarzer, 1931)
