= Plociella mixta =

Scientific classification
- Kingdom: Animalia
- Phylum: Arthropoda
- Class: Insecta
- Order: Coleoptera
- Suborder: Polyphaga
- Infraorder: Cucujiformia
- Family: Cerambycidae
- Genus: Plociella
- Species: P. mixta

Binomial name
- Plociella mixta (Newman, 1842)

Synonyms
- Plocia mixta Newman, 1842; Plocia conspersa Aurivillius, 1927; Plociella conspersa (Aurivillius, 1927)

Species of beetle

Plociella mixta is a species of beetle in the family Cerambycidae. It was described by Newman in 1842.
