= Ebaeides =

Scientific classification
- Domain: Eukaryota
- Kingdom: Animalia
- Phylum: Arthropoda
- Class: Insecta
- Order: Coleoptera
- Suborder: Polyphaga
- Infraorder: Cucujiformia
- Family: Cerambycidae
- Subfamily: Lamiinae
- Tribe: Apomecynini
- Genus: Ebaeides; Pascoe, 1864

Genus of beetles

Ebaeides is a genus of beetles in the family Cerambycidae, containing the following species:

- Ebaeides albopicta Fisher, 1925
- Ebaeides arcuosus Holzschuh, 1998
- Ebaeides basalis Fisher, 1925
- Ebaeides borneensis Fisher, 1925
- Ebaeides corporaali Breuning, 1951
- Ebaeides dohertyi Breuning, 1969
- Ebaeides exigua Pascoe
- Ebaeides fulva Fisher, 1925
- Ebaeides grouvellei (Belon, 1891)
- Ebaeides hirsuta Fisher, 1925
- Ebaeides monstrosa Pascoe, 1864
- Ebaeides montana Fisher, 1925
- Ebaeides palawanica Breuning & Jong, 1941
- Ebaeides palliata Pascoe, 1864
- Ebaeides perakensis Breuning, 1959
- Ebaeides pilosicornis Fisher, 1925
- Ebaeides rufula Pascoe, 1864
- Ebaeides samarensis Breuning, 1956
- Ebaeides strandiella Breuning, 1940
