= Ebaeides arcuosus =

Scientific classification
- Domain: Eukaryota
- Kingdom: Animalia
- Phylum: Arthropoda
- Class: Insecta
- Order: Coleoptera
- Suborder: Polyphaga
- Infraorder: Cucujiformia
- Family: Cerambycidae
- Genus: Ebaeides
- Species: E. arcuosus

Binomial name
- Ebaeides arcuosus Holzschuh, 1998

Species of beetle

Ebaeides arcuosus is a species of beetle in the family Cerambycidae. It was described by Holzschuh in 1998.
