= Ebaeides basalis =

Scientific classification
- Domain: Eukaryota
- Kingdom: Animalia
- Phylum: Arthropoda
- Class: Insecta
- Order: Coleoptera
- Suborder: Polyphaga
- Infraorder: Cucujiformia
- Family: Cerambycidae
- Genus: Ebaeides
- Species: E. basalis

Binomial name
- Ebaeides basalis Fisher, 1925

Species of beetle

Ebaeides basalis is a species of beetle in the family Cerambycidae. It was described by Fisher in 1925.
