= Ebaeides palawanica =

Scientific classification
- Kingdom: Animalia
- Phylum: Arthropoda
- Class: Insecta
- Order: Coleoptera
- Suborder: Polyphaga
- Infraorder: Cucujiformia
- Family: Cerambycidae
- Genus: Ebaeides
- Species: E. palawanica

Binomial name
- Ebaeides palawanica Breuning & Jong, 1941

Species of beetle

Ebaeides palawanica is a species of longhorn beetle in the tribe Apomecynini. It was described by Stephan von Breuning and Jong in 1941.
