= Ebaeides grouvellei =

Scientific classification
- Domain: Eukaryota
- Kingdom: Animalia
- Phylum: Arthropoda
- Class: Insecta
- Order: Coleoptera
- Suborder: Polyphaga
- Infraorder: Cucujiformia
- Family: Cerambycidae
- Genus: Ebaeides
- Species: E. grouvellei

Binomial name
- Ebaeides grouvellei (Belon, 1891)

Species of beetle

Ebaeides grouvellei is a species of beetle in the family Cerambycidae. It was described by Belon in 1891.
