= Ebaeides dohertyi =

Scientific classification
- Domain: Eukaryota
- Kingdom: Animalia
- Phylum: Arthropoda
- Class: Insecta
- Order: Coleoptera
- Suborder: Polyphaga
- Infraorder: Cucujiformia
- Family: Cerambycidae
- Genus: Ebaeides
- Species: E. dohertyi

Binomial name
- Ebaeides dohertyi Breuning, 1969

Species of beetle

Ebaeides dohertyi, is a species of beetle in the family Cerambycidae. It was described by Breuning in 1969.
