= Ebaeides corporaali =

Scientific classification
- Kingdom: Animalia
- Phylum: Arthropoda
- Class: Insecta
- Order: Coleoptera
- Suborder: Polyphaga
- Infraorder: Cucujiformia
- Family: Cerambycidae
- Genus: Ebaeides
- Species: E. corporaali

Binomial name
- Ebaeides corporaali Breuning, 1951

Species of beetle

Ebaeides corporaali is a species of beetle in the family Cerambycidae. It was described by Breuning in 1951.
