= Ebaeides perakensis =

Scientific classification
- Kingdom: Animalia
- Phylum: Arthropoda
- Class: Insecta
- Order: Coleoptera
- Suborder: Polyphaga
- Infraorder: Cucujiformia
- Family: Cerambycidae
- Genus: Ebaeides
- Species: E. perakensis

Binomial name
- Ebaeides perakensis Breuning, 1959

Species of beetle

Ebaeides perakensis is a species of beetle in the family Cerambycidae. It was described by Breuning in 1959.
