= Ebaeides rufula =

Scientific classification
- Domain: Eukaryota
- Kingdom: Animalia
- Phylum: Arthropoda
- Class: Insecta
- Order: Coleoptera
- Suborder: Polyphaga
- Infraorder: Cucujiformia
- Family: Cerambycidae
- Genus: Ebaeides
- Species: E. rufula

Binomial name
- Ebaeides rufula Pascoe, 1864

Species of beetle

Ebaeides rufula is a species of longhorn beetle in the tribe Apomecynini. It was described by Pascoe in 1864.
