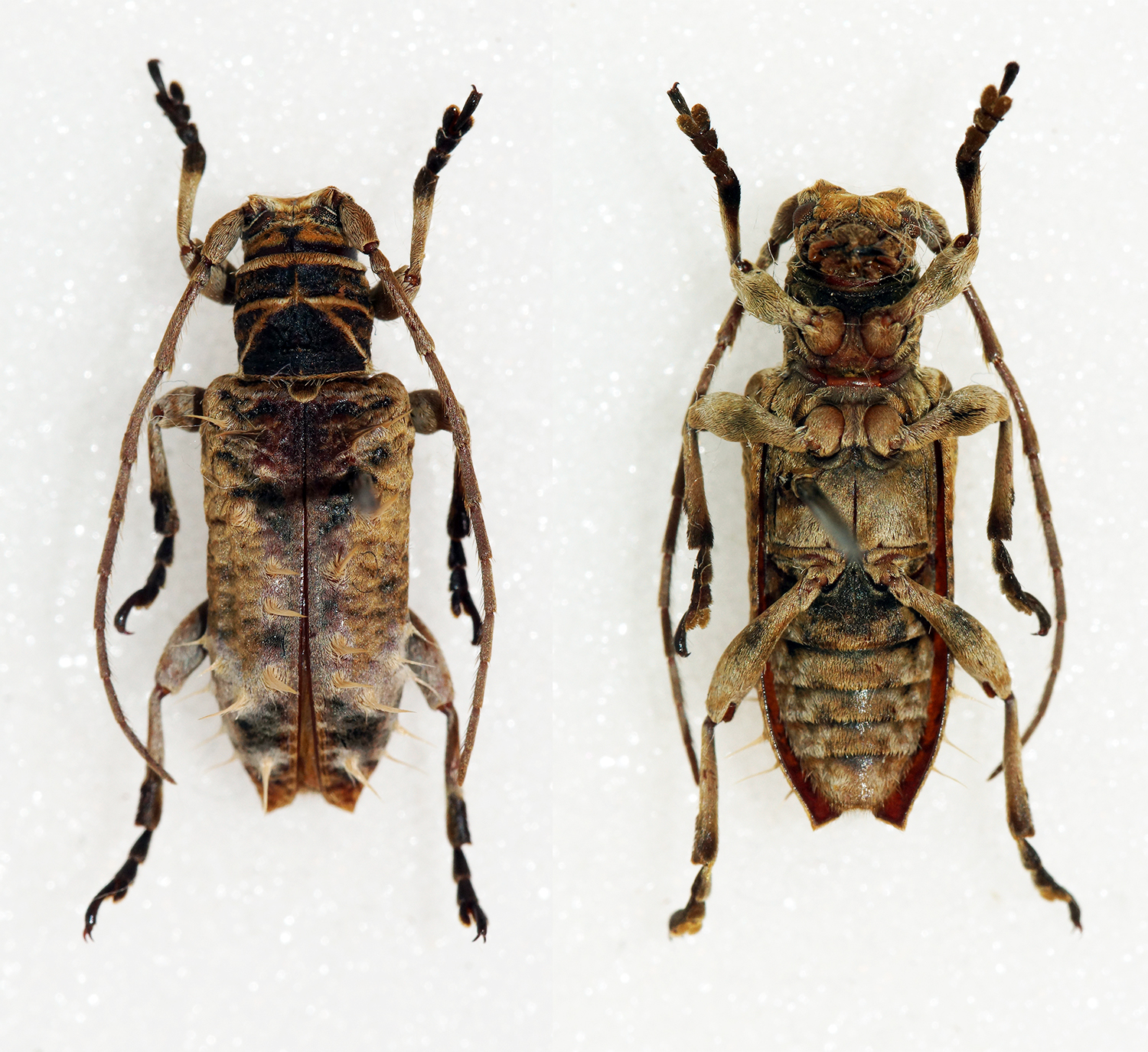

Scientific classification
- Kingdom: Animalia
- Phylum: Arthropoda
- Class: Insecta
- Order: Coleoptera
- Suborder: Polyphaga
- Infraorder: Cucujiformia
- Family: Cerambycidae
- Genus: Callomecyna
- Species: C. leehsuehae

Binomial name
- Callomecyna leehsuehae Yamasako & Chou, 2014

= Callomecyna leehsuehae =

Species of beetle

Callomecyna leehsuehae is a species of beetle in the family Cerambycidae. It was described by the entomologists Junsuke Yamasako and Wen-I Chou in 2014. The species is named after Lee Hsueh, who collected the holotype of the species. Males have a body length of 15 mm and a body thickness of 4.9 mm. The body is black and the elytra is reddish-brown with blackish spots, while the antennae are reddish-brown. Endemic to Taiwan, where it is known only from Mount Lalashan in Taoyuan County at an elevation of 1500 m.

== Taxonomy ==
Callomecyna leehsuehae was described by the entomologists Junsuke Yamasako and Wen-I Chou in 2014 on the basis of an adult male specimen collected from Mount Lalashan in Taoyuan County, Taiwan. The species is named after Lee Hsueh, who collected the holotype of the species.

== Description ==
Males have a body length of 15 mm and a body thickness of 4.9 mm. The body is black and the elytra is reddish-brown with blackish spots, while the antennae are reddish-brown. The species is characterized by a pair of distinct tubercles on its upper surface, light yellowish, fine hairs on the elytra, tufts of longer, bristle-like brownish hairs on the swollen areas near the base, and the sparse punctures on the basal half of the elytra, becoming nearly absent in the apical third.

== Distribution ==
Endemic to Taiwan, where it is known only from Mount Lalashan at an elevation of 1500 m.
