= Callomecyna superba =

Scientific classification
- Kingdom: Animalia
- Phylum: Arthropoda
- Class: Insecta
- Order: Coleoptera
- Suborder: Polyphaga
- Infraorder: Cucujiformia
- Family: Cerambycidae
- Genus: Callomecyna
- Species: C. superba

Binomial name
- Callomecyna superba Tippmann, 1965

Species of beetle

Callomecyna superba is a species of beetle in the family Cerambycidae. It was described by Tippmann in 1965.
