= Callomecyna =

Scientific classification
- Kingdom: Animalia
- Phylum: Arthropoda
- Class: Insecta
- Order: Coleoptera
- Suborder: Polyphaga
- Infraorder: Cucujiformia
- Family: Cerambycidae
- Tribe: Apomecynini
- Genus: Callomecyna

Genus of beetles

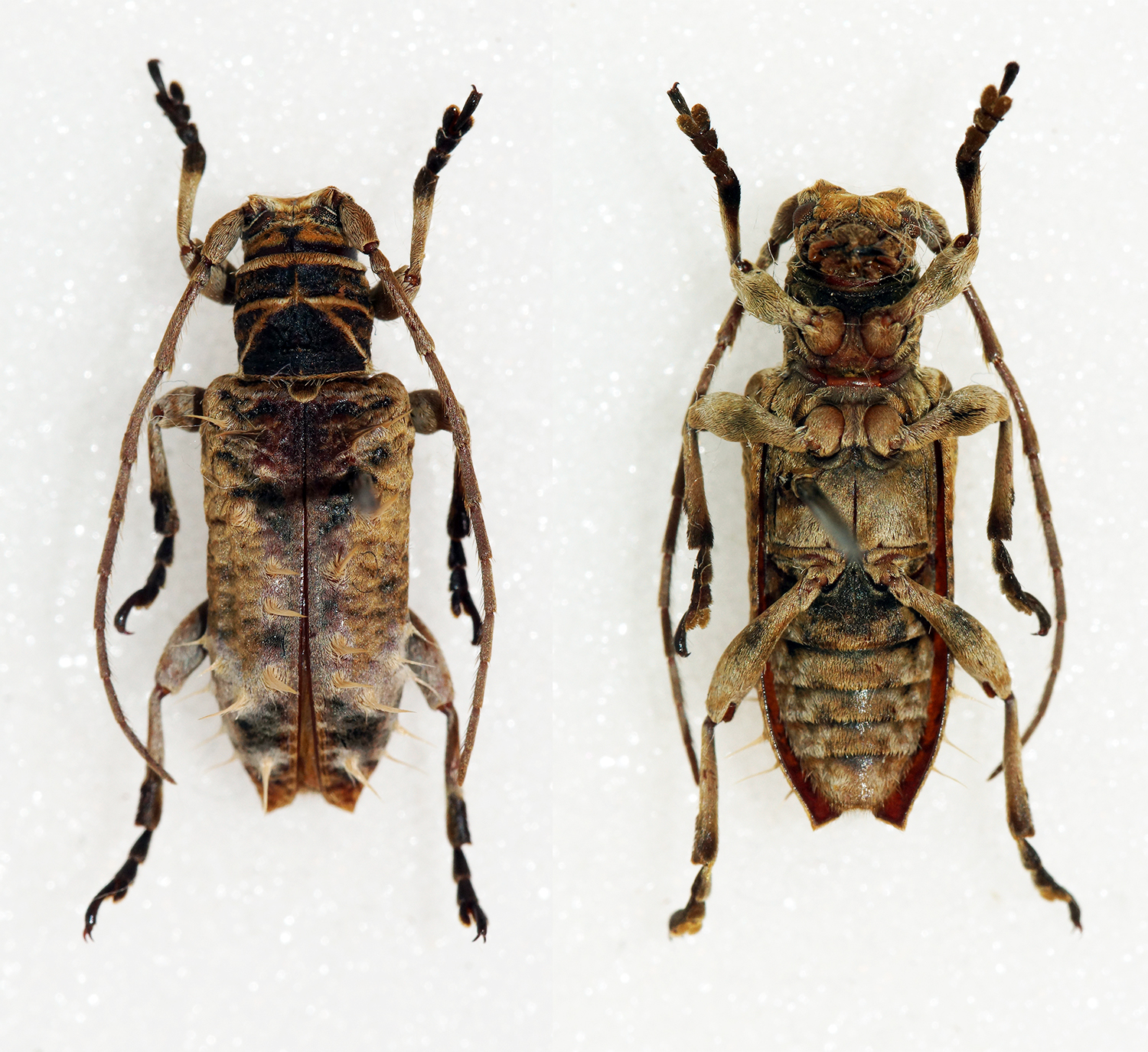
A male Callomecyna Leehsuehae specimen

Callomecyna is a genus of beetles in the family Cerambycidae, containing the following species:

- Callomecyna leehsuehae Yamasako & Chou, 2014
- Callomecyna superba Tippmann, 1965
- Callomecyna tigrinula Holzschuh, 1999
