= Xylariopsis fulvonotata =

Scientific classification
- Kingdom: Animalia
- Phylum: Arthropoda
- Class: Insecta
- Order: Coleoptera
- Suborder: Polyphaga
- Infraorder: Cucujiformia
- Family: Cerambycidae
- Genus: Xylariopsis
- Species: X. fulvonotata

Binomial name
- Xylariopsis fulvonotata (Pic, 1928)

Synonyms
- Falsosybra fulvonotata Pic, 1928

Species of beetle

Xylariopsis fulvonotata is a species of beetle in the family Cerambycidae. It was described by Maurice Pic in 1928. It is known from Vietnam.
