= Xylariopsis mimica =

Scientific classification
- Domain: Eukaryota
- Kingdom: Animalia
- Phylum: Arthropoda
- Class: Insecta
- Order: Coleoptera
- Suborder: Polyphaga
- Infraorder: Cucujiformia
- Family: Cerambycidae
- Genus: Xylariopsis
- Species: X. mimica

Binomial name
- Xylariopsis mimica Bates, 1884

Species of beetle

Xylariopsis mimica is a species of beetle in the family Cerambycidae. It was described by Bates in 1884. It is known from China, Russia, and Japan.
