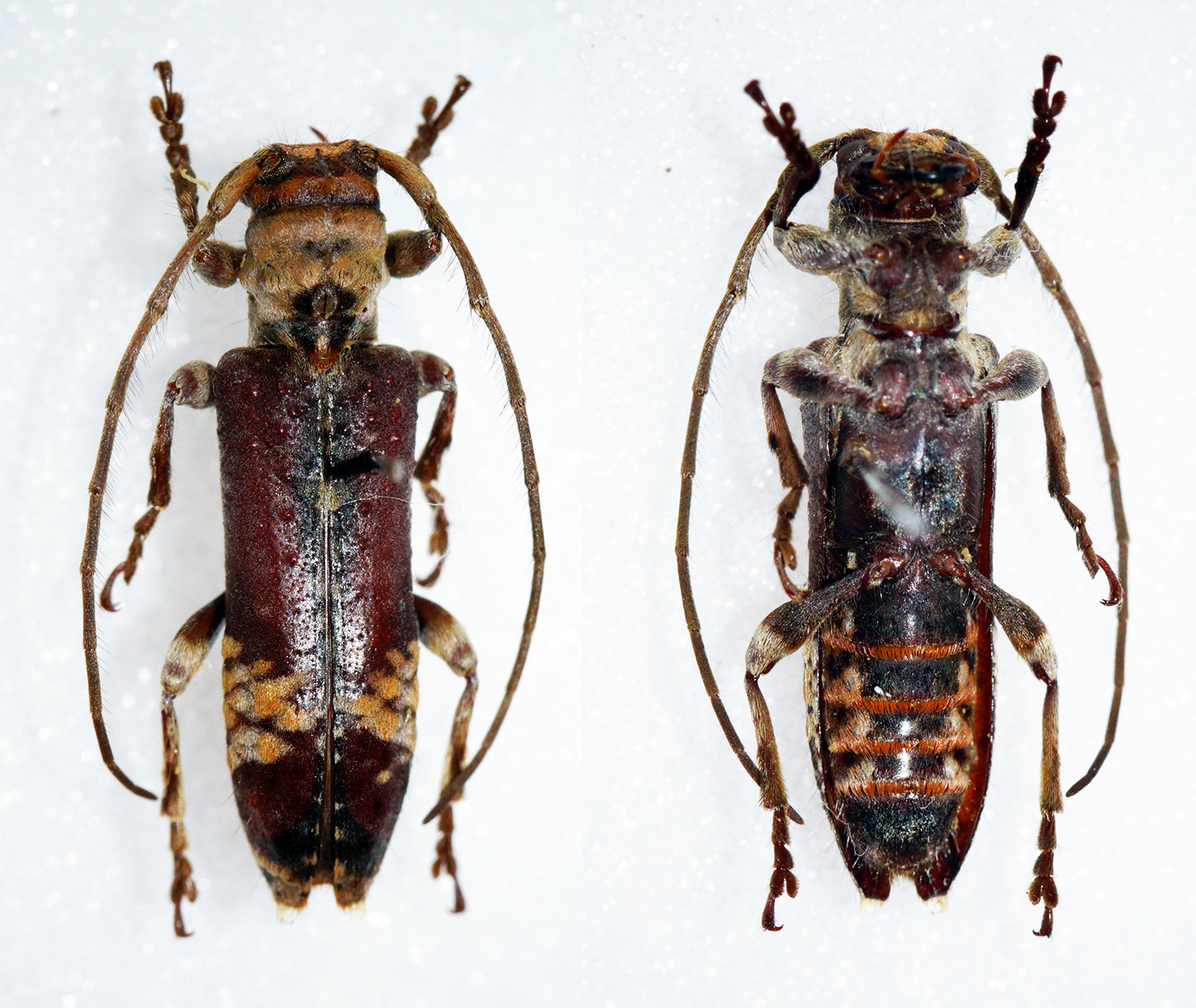

Scientific classification
- Kingdom: Animalia
- Phylum: Arthropoda
- Class: Insecta
- Order: Coleoptera
- Suborder: Polyphaga
- Infraorder: Cucujiformia
- Family: Cerambycidae
- Genus: Xylariopsis
- Species: X. iriei

Binomial name
- Xylariopsis iriei Hayashi, 1976

= Xylariopsis iriei =

Species of beetle

Xylariopsis iriei is a species of beetle in the family Cerambycidae. It was described by Hayashi in 1976. It is known from Japan.
