= Xylariopsis esakii =

Scientific classification
- Domain: Eukaryota
- Kingdom: Animalia
- Phylum: Arthropoda
- Class: Insecta
- Order: Coleoptera
- Suborder: Polyphaga
- Infraorder: Cucujiformia
- Family: Cerambycidae
- Genus: Xylariopsis
- Species: X. esakii

Binomial name
- Xylariopsis esakii Mitono, 1943

Species of beetle

Xylariopsis esakii is a species of beetle in the family Cerambycidae. It was described by Mitono in 1943. It is known from Taiwan.
