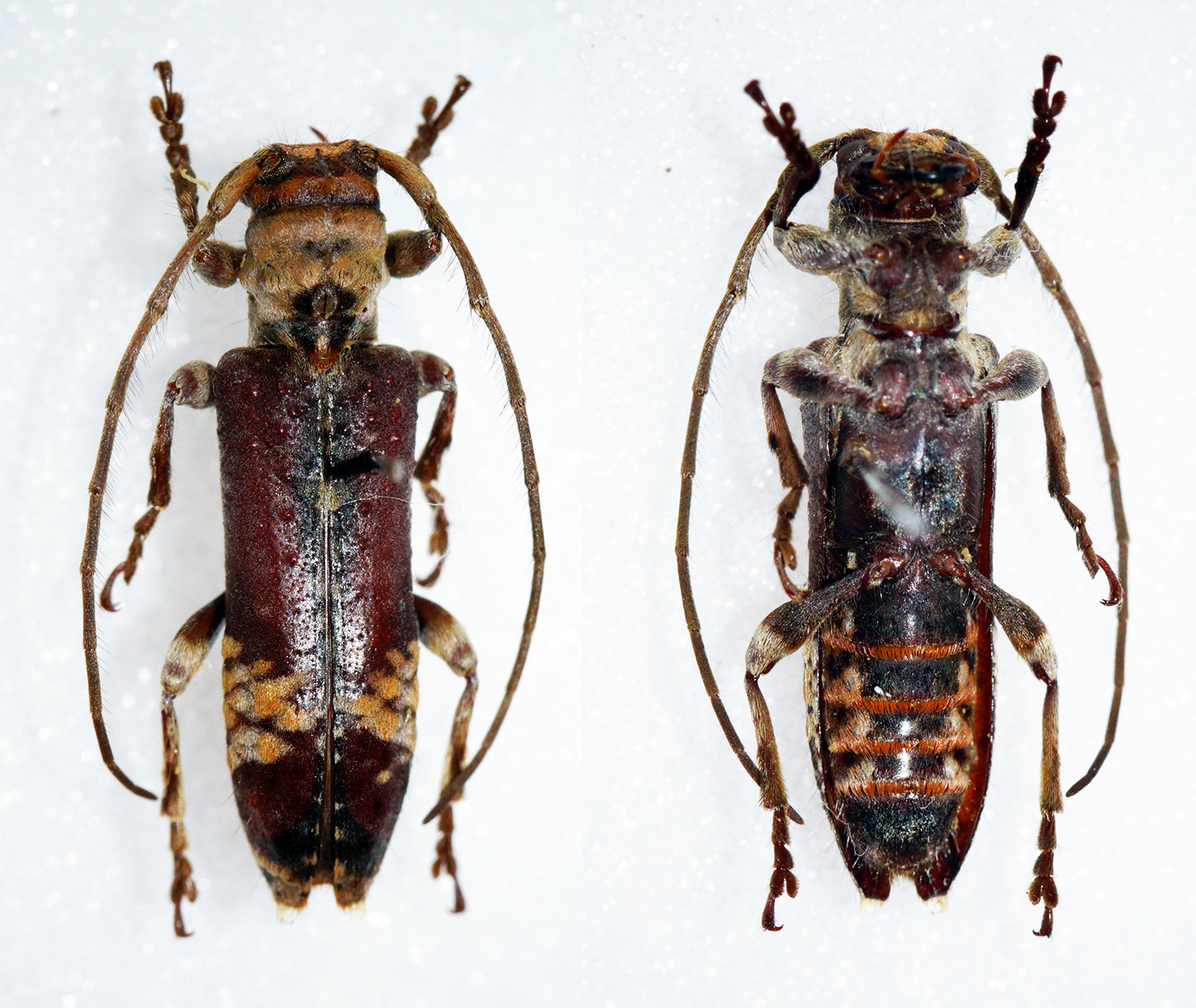
- Xylariopsis iriei

Scientific classification
- Domain: Eukaryota
- Kingdom: Animalia
- Phylum: Arthropoda
- Class: Insecta
- Order: Coleoptera
- Suborder: Polyphaga
- Infraorder: Cucujiformia
- Family: Cerambycidae
- Genus: Xylariopsis

= Xylariopsis =

Genus of beetles

Xylariopsis is a genus of beetles in the family Cerambycidae, containing the following species:

subgenus Falsosybra

- Xylariopsis fulvonotata (Pic, 1928)

subgenus Xylariopsis

- Xylariopsis esakii Mitono, 1943
- Xylariopsis iriei Hayashi, 1976
- Xylariopsis mimica Bates, 1884
