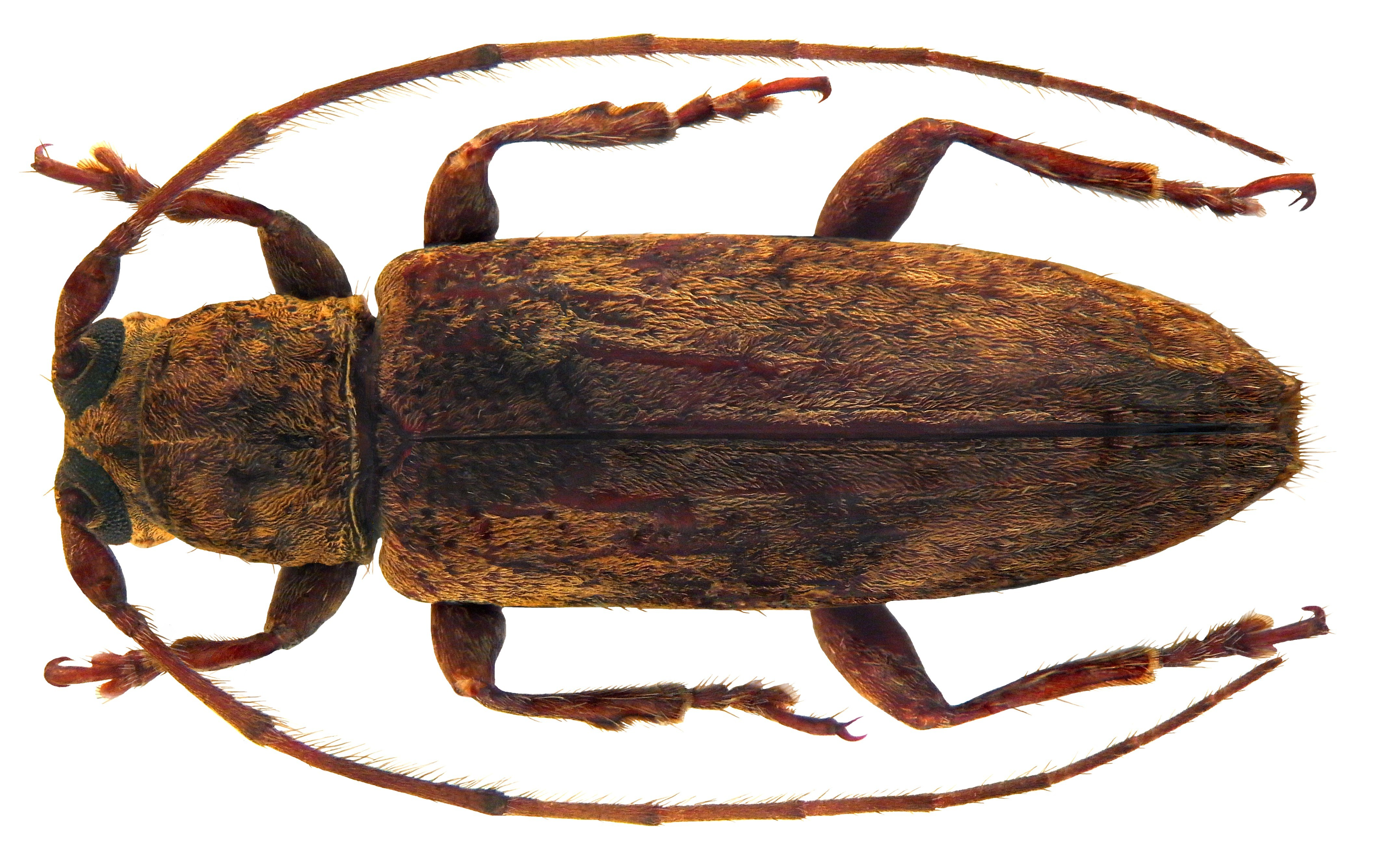

Scientific classification
- Kingdom: Animalia
- Phylum: Arthropoda
- Class: Insecta
- Order: Coleoptera
- Suborder: Polyphaga
- Infraorder: Cucujiformia
- Family: Cerambycidae
- Genus: Trichohestima
- Species: T. unicolor

Binomial name
- Trichohestima unicolor (Breuning, 1959)

Synonyms
- Parepilysta unicolor Breuning, 1959

= Trichohestima unicolor =

Species of beetle

Trichohestima unicolor is a species of beetle in the family Cerambycidae. It was described by Breuning in 1959.
