= Trichohestima biroi =

Scientific classification
- Kingdom: Animalia
- Phylum: Arthropoda
- Class: Insecta
- Order: Coleoptera
- Suborder: Polyphaga
- Infraorder: Cucujiformia
- Family: Cerambycidae
- Genus: Trichohestima
- Species: T. biroi

Binomial name
- Trichohestima biroi (Breuning, 1953)

Synonyms
- Sybra biroi Breuning, 1953; Sybra fuscomarmoratipennis Breuning, 1966

Species of beetle

Trichohestima biroi is a species of beetle in the family Cerambycidae. It was described by Breuning in 1953.
