= Trichohestima =

Scientific classification
- Kingdom: Animalia
- Phylum: Arthropoda
- Class: Insecta
- Order: Coleoptera
- Suborder: Polyphaga
- Infraorder: Cucujiformia
- Family: Cerambycidae
- Tribe: Apomecynini
- Genus: Trichohestima

Genus of beetles

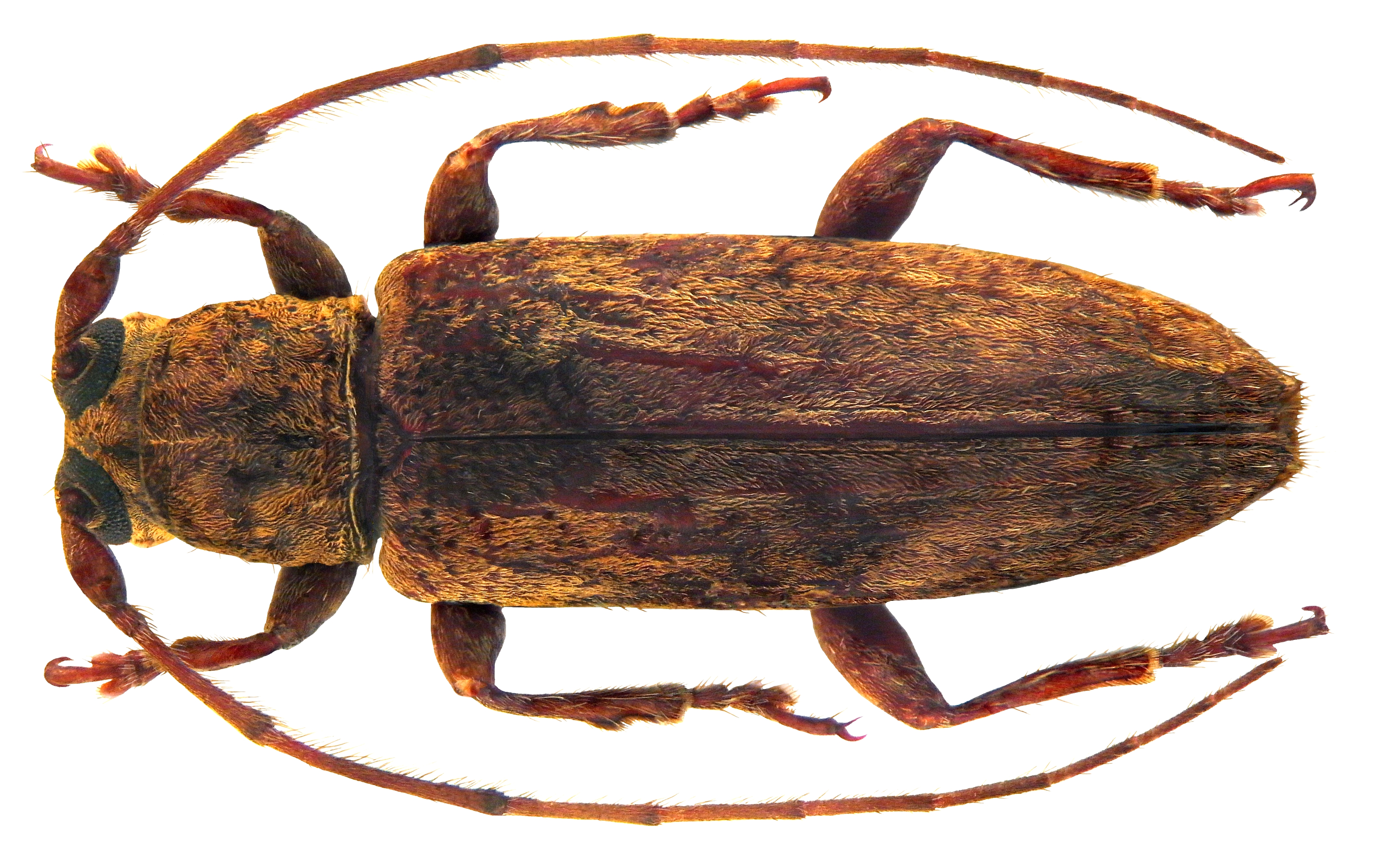
Trichohestima unicolor

Trichohestima is a genus of beetles in the family Cerambycidae, containing the following species:

- Trichohestima biroi (Breuning, 1953)
- Trichohestima setifera Breuning, 1943
- Trichohestima unicolor (Breuning, 1959)
