= Ptericoptus similis =

Scientific classification
- Kingdom: Animalia
- Phylum: Arthropoda
- Class: Insecta
- Order: Coleoptera
- Suborder: Polyphaga
- Infraorder: Cucujiformia
- Family: Cerambycidae
- Genus: Ptericoptus
- Species: P. similis

Binomial name
- Ptericoptus similis Breuning, 1939

Species of beetle

Ptericoptus similis is a species of beetle in the family Cerambycidae. It was described by Breuning in 1939, and is found in Colombia and Venezuela.
