= Ptericoptus intermedius =

Scientific classification
- Kingdom: Animalia
- Phylum: Arthropoda
- Class: Insecta
- Order: Coleoptera
- Suborder: Polyphaga
- Infraorder: Cucujiformia
- Family: Cerambycidae
- Genus: Ptericoptus
- Species: P. intermedius

Binomial name
- Ptericoptus intermedius Breuning, 1939

Species of beetle

Ptericoptus intermedius is a species of beetle from the family Cerambycidae. It was described by Breuning in 1939. It is known from Mexico.
