= Ptericoptus =

Scientific classification
- Kingdom: Animalia
- Phylum: Arthropoda
- Class: Insecta
- Order: Coleoptera
- Suborder: Polyphaga
- Infraorder: Cucujiformia
- Family: Cerambycidae
- Subfamily: Lamiinae
- Tribe: Apomecynini
- Genus: Ptericoptus; Lacordaire, 1830

Genus of beetles

Ptericoptus is a genus of beetles in the family Cerambycidae, containing the following species:

- Ptericoptus acuminatus (Fabricius, 1801)
- Ptericoptus avanyae Martins & Galileo, 2010
- Ptericoptus borealis Breuning, 1939
- Ptericoptus caudalis Bates, 1880
- Ptericoptus clavicornis (Fabricius, 1801)
- Ptericoptus columbianus Breuning, 1950
- Ptericoptus corumbaensis Galileo & Martins, 2003
- Ptericoptus dorsalis Audinet-Serville, 1835
- Ptericoptus fuscus Bates, 1885
- Ptericoptus griseolus Bates, 1880
- Ptericoptus intermedius Breuning, 1939
- Ptericoptus meridionalis Breuning, 1939
- Ptericoptus panamensis Bates, 1880
- Ptericoptus similis Breuning, 1939
- Ptericoptus sinuatus Breuning, 1939
