= Ptericoptus columbianus =

Scientific classification
- Kingdom: Animalia
- Phylum: Arthropoda
- Class: Insecta
- Order: Coleoptera
- Suborder: Polyphaga
- Infraorder: Cucujiformia
- Family: Cerambycidae
- Genus: Ptericoptus
- Species: P. columbianus

Binomial name
- Ptericoptus columbianus Breuning, 1950

Species of beetle

Ptericoptus columbianus is a species of beetle in the family Cerambycidae. It was described by Breuning in 1950. It is known from Colombia.
