= Ptericoptus panamensis =

Scientific classification
- Kingdom: Animalia
- Phylum: Arthropoda
- Class: Insecta
- Order: Coleoptera
- Suborder: Polyphaga
- Infraorder: Cucujiformia
- Family: Cerambycidae
- Genus: Ptericoptus
- Species: P. panamensis

Binomial name
- Ptericoptus panamensis Bates, 1880

Species of beetle

Ptericoptus panamensis is a species of beetle in the family Cerambycidae. It was described by Bates in 1880. It is known from Panama.
