= Ptericoptus meridionalis =

Scientific classification
- Kingdom: Animalia
- Phylum: Arthropoda
- Class: Insecta
- Order: Coleoptera
- Suborder: Polyphaga
- Infraorder: Cucujiformia
- Family: Cerambycidae
- Genus: Ptericoptus
- Species: P. meridionalis

Binomial name
- Ptericoptus meridionalis Breuning, 1939

Synonyms
- Ptericoptus hybridus meridionalis Breuning, 1939

Species of beetle

Ptericoptus meridionalis is a species of beetle in the family Cerambycidae. It was described by Breuning in 1939. It is known from Paraguay and Argentina.
