= Ptericoptus dorsalis =

Scientific classification
- Kingdom: Animalia
- Phylum: Arthropoda
- Class: Insecta
- Order: Coleoptera
- Suborder: Polyphaga
- Infraorder: Cucujiformia
- Family: Cerambycidae
- Genus: Ptericoptus
- Species: P. dorsalis

Binomial name
- Ptericoptus dorsalis Audinet-Serville, 1835

Species of beetle

Ptericoptus dorsalis is a species of beetle in the family Cerambycidae. It was described by Audinet-Serville in 1835. It is known from Brazil.
