= Ptericoptus avanyae =

Scientific classification
- Kingdom: Animalia
- Phylum: Arthropoda
- Class: Insecta
- Order: Coleoptera
- Suborder: Polyphaga
- Infraorder: Cucujiformia
- Family: Cerambycidae
- Genus: Ptericoptus
- Species: P. avanyae

Binomial name
- Ptericoptus avanyae Martins & Galileo, 2010

Species of beetle

Ptericoptus avanyae is a species of beetle in the family Cerambycidae. It was described by Martins and Galileo in 2010. It is known from Brazil.
