= Ptericoptus clavicornis =

Scientific classification
- Kingdom: Animalia
- Phylum: Arthropoda
- Class: Insecta
- Order: Coleoptera
- Suborder: Polyphaga
- Infraorder: Cucujiformia
- Family: Cerambycidae
- Genus: Ptericoptus
- Species: P. clavicornis

Binomial name
- Ptericoptus clavicornis (Fabricius, 1801)

Species of beetle

Ptericoptus clavicornis is a species of beetle in the family Cerambycidae. It was described by Johan Christian Fabricius in 1801. It is known from Guyana and French Guiana.
