= Ptericoptus sinuatus =

Scientific classification
- Kingdom: Animalia
- Phylum: Arthropoda
- Class: Insecta
- Order: Coleoptera
- Suborder: Polyphaga
- Infraorder: Cucujiformia
- Family: Cerambycidae
- Genus: Ptericoptus
- Species: P. sinuatus

Binomial name
- Ptericoptus sinuatus Breuning, 1939

Species of beetle

Ptericoptus sinuatus is a species of beetle in the family Cerambycidae. It was described by Breuning in 1939. It is known from Colombia and Peru.
