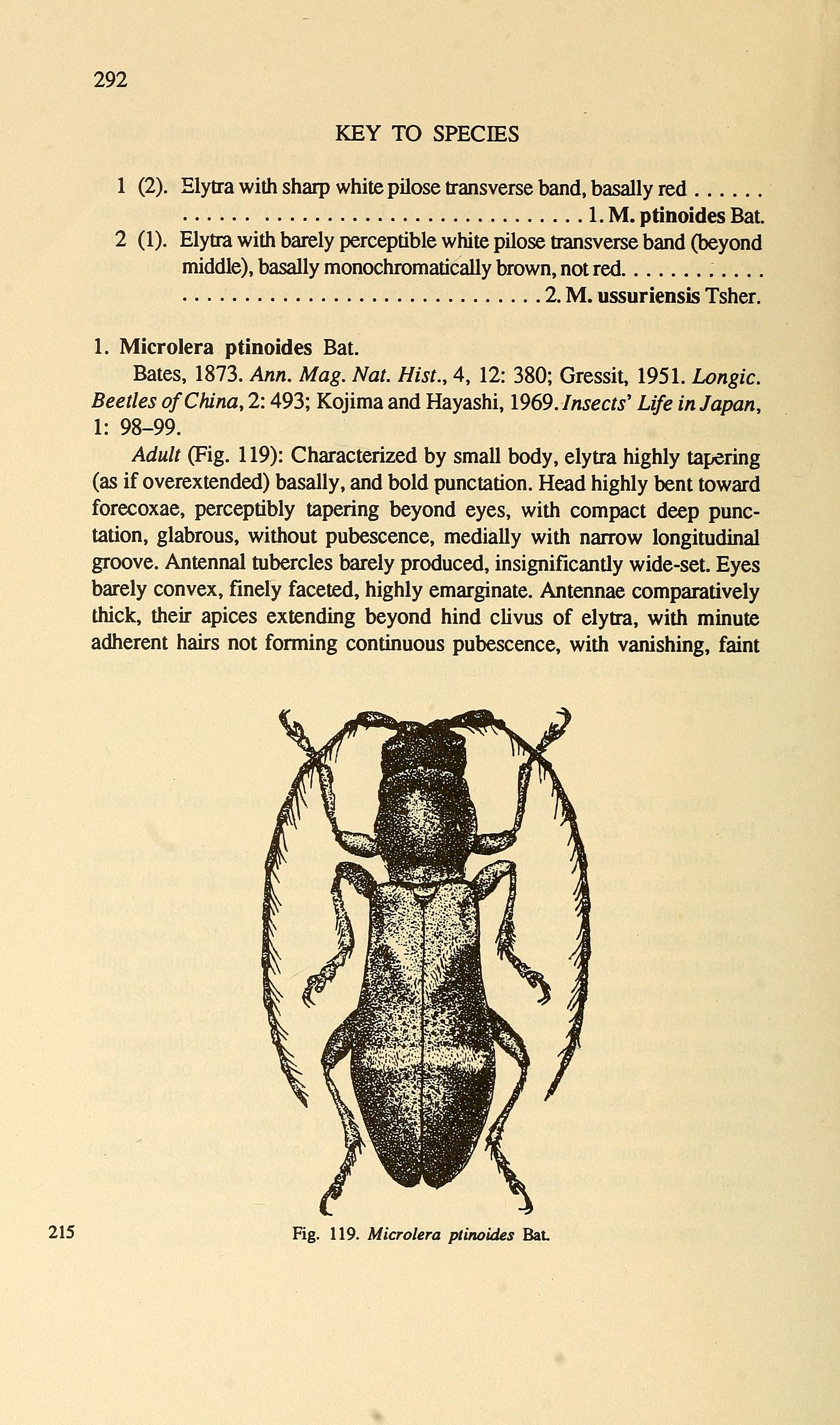

Scientific classification
- Kingdom: Animalia
- Phylum: Arthropoda
- Class: Insecta
- Order: Coleoptera
- Suborder: Polyphaga
- Infraorder: Cucujiformia
- Family: Cerambycidae
- Genus: Microlera
- Species: M. ptinoides

Binomial name
- Microlera ptinoides Bates, 1873

= Microlera ptinoides =

Species of beetle

Microlera ptinoides is a species of beetle in the family Cerambycidae. It was described by Henry Walter Bates in 1873.
