= Microlera =

Scientific classification
- Kingdom: Animalia
- Phylum: Arthropoda
- Clade: Pancrustacea
- Class: Insecta
- Order: Coleoptera
- Suborder: Polyphaga
- Infraorder: Cucujiformia
- Family: Cerambycidae
- Tribe: Apomecynini
- Genus: Microlera

Genus of beetles

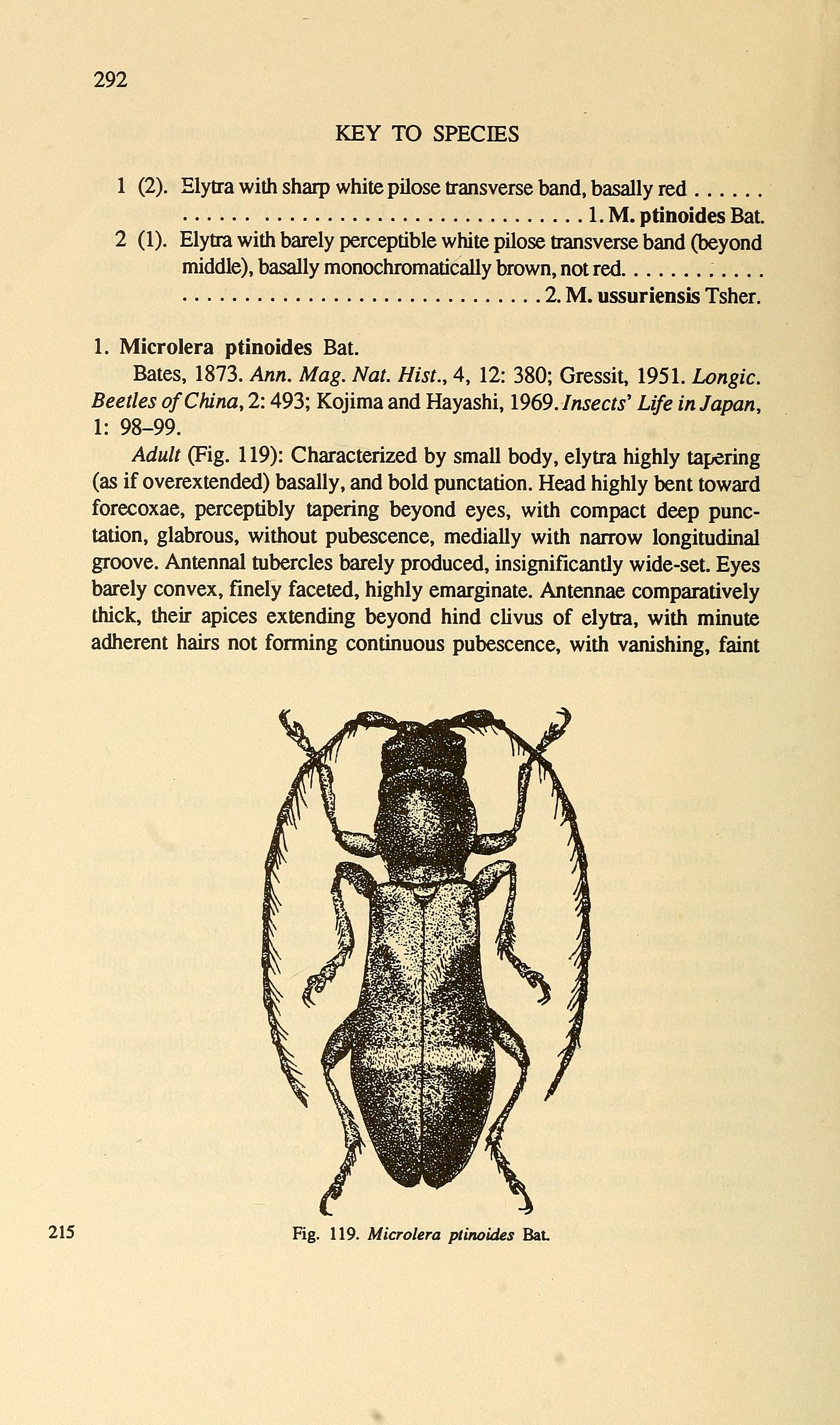

Microlera is a genus of beetles in the family Cerambycidae, containing the following species:

- Microlera kanoi Hayashi, 1971
- Microlera ptinoides Bates, 1873
- Microlera yayeyamensis Hayashi, 1968
