= Microlera yayeyamensis =

Scientific classification
- Kingdom: Animalia
- Phylum: Arthropoda
- Class: Insecta
- Order: Coleoptera
- Suborder: Polyphaga
- Infraorder: Cucujiformia
- Family: Cerambycidae
- Genus: Microlera
- Species: M. yayeyamensis

Binomial name
- Microlera yayeyamensis Hayashi, 1968

Species of beetle

Microlera yayeyamensis is a species of beetle in the family Cerambycidae. It was described by Hayashi in 1968. They are found on Okinawa Island.
