= Zorilispe acutipennis =

Scientific classification
- Domain: Eukaryota
- Kingdom: Animalia
- Phylum: Arthropoda
- Class: Insecta
- Order: Coleoptera
- Suborder: Polyphaga
- Infraorder: Cucujiformia
- Family: Cerambycidae
- Genus: Zorilispe
- Species: Z. acutipennis

Binomial name
- Zorilispe acutipennis Pascoe, 1865

Species of beetle

Zorilispe acutipennis is a species of beetle in the family Cerambycidae. It was described by Pascoe in 1865. It is known from the Celebes Islands.
