= Zorilispe tonkinensis =

Scientific classification
- Kingdom: Animalia
- Phylum: Arthropoda
- Class: Insecta
- Order: Coleoptera
- Suborder: Polyphaga
- Infraorder: Cucujiformia
- Family: Cerambycidae
- Genus: Zorilispe
- Species: Z. tonkinensis

Binomial name
- Zorilispe tonkinensis Breuning, 1956

Species of beetle

Zorilispe tonkinensis is a species of beetle in the family Cerambycidae. It was described by Breuning in 1956. It is known from Vietnam.
