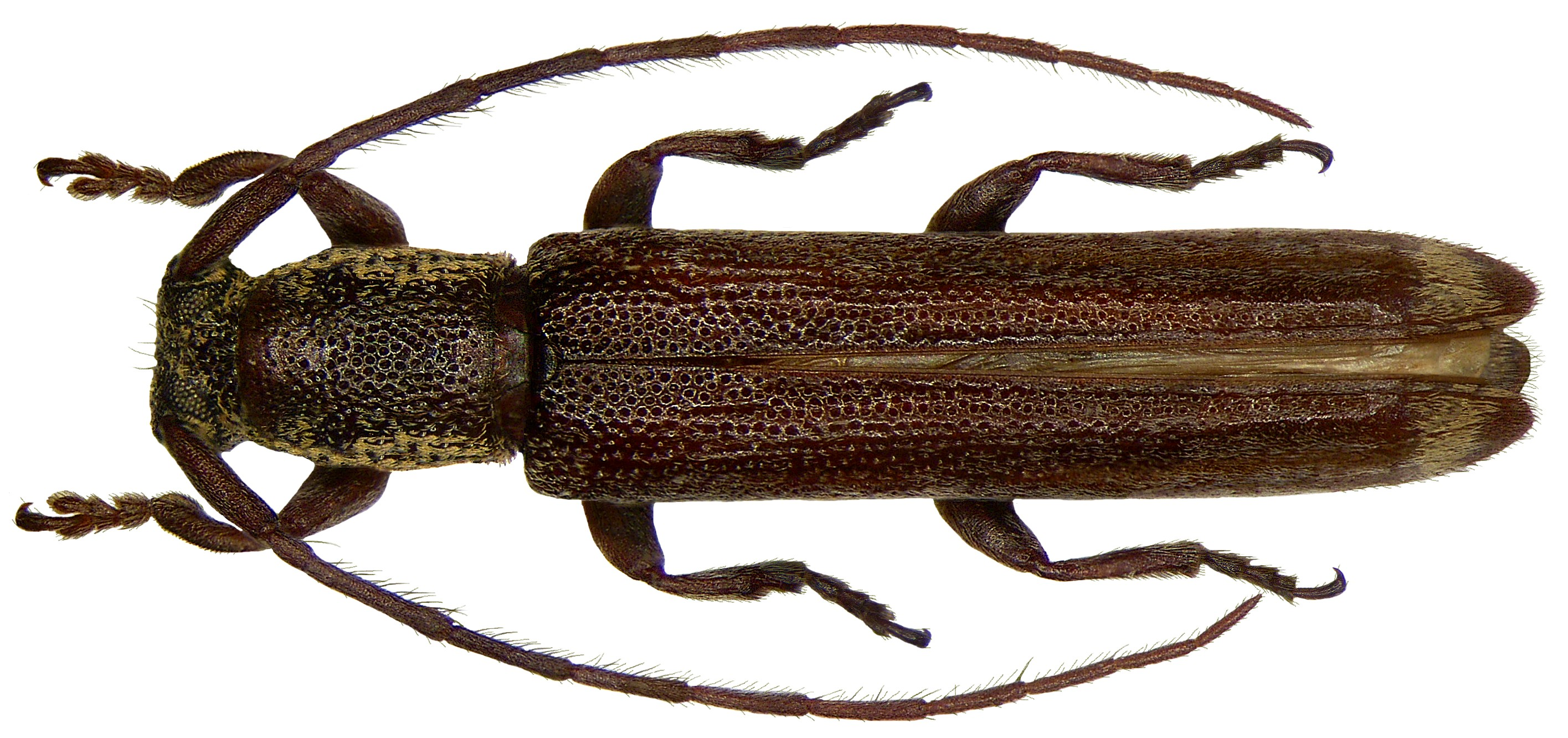
- Zorilispe luconica

Scientific classification
- Domain: Eukaryota
- Kingdom: Animalia
- Phylum: Arthropoda
- Class: Insecta
- Order: Coleoptera
- Suborder: Polyphaga
- Infraorder: Cucujiformia
- Family: Cerambycidae
- Subfamily: Lamiinae
- Tribe: Apomecynini
- Genus: Zorilispe; Pascoe, 1865

= Zorilispe =

Genus of beetles

Zorilispe is a genus of beetles in the family Cerambycidae, containing the following species:

- Zorilispe acutipennis Pascoe, 1865
- Zorilispe albosetosa Breuning, 1939
- Zorilispe flavoapicalis Breuning, 1939
- Zorilispe fulvisparsa Pascoe, 1865
- Zorilispe seriepunctata Breuning, 1939
- Zorilispe spinipennis Breuning, 1939
- Zorilispe sumatrana Breuning, 1939
- Zorilispe tonkinensis Breuning, 1956
