= Zorilispe spinipennis =

Scientific classification
- Kingdom: Animalia
- Phylum: Arthropoda
- Clade: Pancrustacea
- Class: Insecta
- Order: Coleoptera
- Suborder: Polyphaga
- Infraorder: Cucujiformia
- Family: Cerambycidae
- Genus: Zorilispe
- Species: Z. spinipennis

Binomial name
- Zorilispe spinipennis Breuning, 1939

Species of beetle

Zorilispe spinipennis is a species of beetle in the family Cerambycidae. It was described by Breuning in 1939. It is known from Java.
