= Dorcasta =

Scientific classification
- Domain: Eukaryota
- Kingdom: Animalia
- Phylum: Arthropoda
- Class: Insecta
- Order: Coleoptera
- Suborder: Polyphaga
- Infraorder: Cucujiformia
- Family: Cerambycidae
- Tribe: Apomecynini
- Genus: Dorcasta

Genus of beetles

Dorcasta is a genus of beetles in the family Cerambycidae, containing the following species:

- Dorcasta borealis Breuning, 1940
- Dorcasta cinerea (Horn, 1860)
- Dorcasta crassicornis Pascoe, 1858
- Dorcasta dasycera (Erichson in Schomburg, 1848)
- Dorcasta gracilis Fisher, 1932
- Dorcasta implicata Melzer, 1934
- Dorcasta quadrispinosa Breuning, 1940
- Dorcasta singularis Martins & Galileo, 2001
