= Dorcasta singularis =

Scientific classification
- Domain: Eukaryota
- Kingdom: Animalia
- Phylum: Arthropoda
- Class: Insecta
- Order: Coleoptera
- Suborder: Polyphaga
- Infraorder: Cucujiformia
- Family: Cerambycidae
- Genus: Dorcasta
- Species: D. singularis

Binomial name
- Dorcasta singularis Martins & Galileo, 2001

Species of beetle

Dorcasta singularis is a species of beetle in the family Cerambycidae. It was described by Martins and Galileo in 2001.
