= Dorcasta crassicornis =

Scientific classification
- Domain: Eukaryota
- Kingdom: Animalia
- Phylum: Arthropoda
- Class: Insecta
- Order: Coleoptera
- Suborder: Polyphaga
- Infraorder: Cucujiformia
- Family: Cerambycidae
- Genus: Dorcasta
- Species: D. crassicornis

Binomial name
- Dorcasta crassicornis Pascoe, 1858

Species of beetle

Dorcasta crassicornis is a species of beetle in the family Cerambycidae. It was described by Pascoe in 1858.
