= Dorcasta gracilis =

Scientific classification
- Domain: Eukaryota
- Kingdom: Animalia
- Phylum: Arthropoda
- Class: Insecta
- Order: Coleoptera
- Suborder: Polyphaga
- Infraorder: Cucujiformia
- Family: Cerambycidae
- Genus: Dorcasta
- Species: D. gracilis

Binomial name
- Dorcasta gracilis Fisher, 1932

Species of beetle

Dorcasta gracilis is a species of beetle in the family Cerambycidae. It was described by Fisher in 1932.
