= Dorcasta cinerea =

Scientific classification
- Domain: Eukaryota
- Kingdom: Animalia
- Phylum: Arthropoda
- Class: Insecta
- Order: Coleoptera
- Suborder: Polyphaga
- Infraorder: Cucujiformia
- Family: Cerambycidae
- Genus: Dorcasta
- Species: D. cinerea

Binomial name
- Dorcasta cinerea (Horn, 1860)

Species of beetle

Dorcasta cinerea is a species of beetle in the family Cerambycidae, described by George Henry Horn in 1860.
