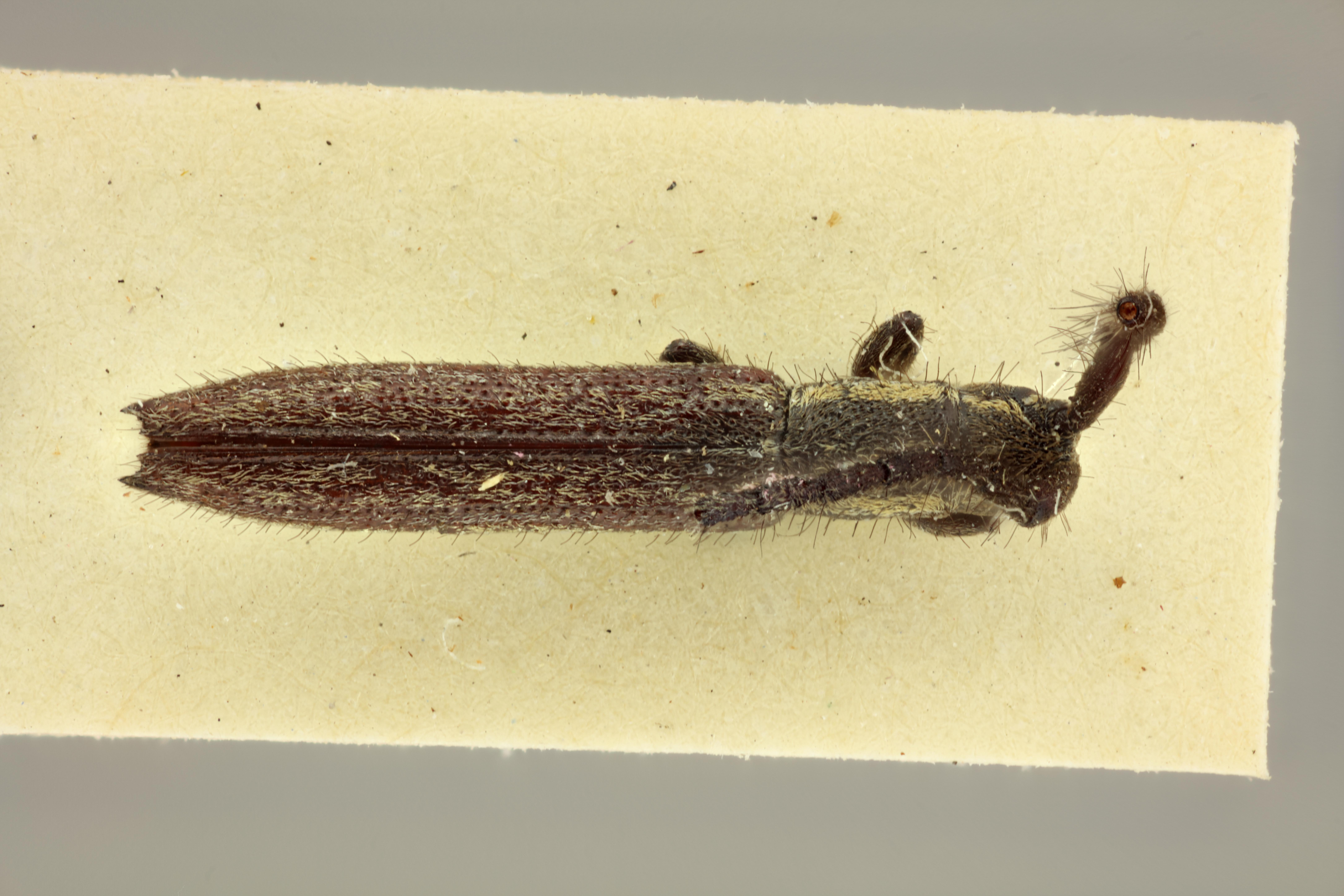

Scientific classification
- Kingdom: Animalia
- Phylum: Arthropoda
- Class: Insecta
- Order: Coleoptera
- Suborder: Polyphaga
- Infraorder: Cucujiformia
- Family: Cerambycidae
- Genus: Dorcasta
- Species: D. borealis

Binomial name
- Dorcasta borealis Breuning, 1940

= Dorcasta borealis =

Species of beetle

Dorcasta borealis is a species of beetle in the family Cerambycidae. It was described by Breuning in 1940.
