= Phrynidius salvadorensis =

Scientific classification
- Domain: Eukaryota
- Kingdom: Animalia
- Phylum: Arthropoda
- Class: Insecta
- Order: Coleoptera
- Suborder: Polyphaga
- Infraorder: Cucujiformia
- Family: Cerambycidae
- Genus: Phrynidius
- Species: P. salvadorensis

Binomial name
- Phrynidius salvadorensis Franz, 1954

Species of beetle

Phrynidius salvadorensis is a species of beetle in the family Cerambycidae. It was described by Franz in 1954. It contains two subspecies, P. salvadorensis montecristensis and P. salvadorensis salvadorensis.
