= Phrynidius echinus =

Scientific classification
- Domain: Eukaryota
- Kingdom: Animalia
- Phylum: Arthropoda
- Class: Insecta
- Order: Coleoptera
- Suborder: Polyphaga
- Infraorder: Cucujiformia
- Family: Cerambycidae
- Genus: Phrynidius
- Species: P. echinus

Binomial name
- Phrynidius echinus Bates, 1880

Species of beetle

Phrynidius echinus is a species of beetle in the family Cerambycidae. It was described by Bates in 1880. It is known from Honduras, Guatemala, and Panama.
