= Phrynidius inaequalis =

Scientific classification
- Domain: Eukaryota
- Kingdom: Animalia
- Phylum: Arthropoda
- Class: Insecta
- Order: Coleoptera
- Suborder: Polyphaga
- Infraorder: Cucujiformia
- Family: Cerambycidae
- Genus: Phrynidius
- Species: P. inaequalis

Binomial name
- Phrynidius inaequalis (Say, 1835)

Synonyms
- Moneilema inequalis Say, 1835

Species of beetle

Phrynidius inaequalis is a species of beetle in the family Cerambycidae. It was described by Say in 1835. It is known from Mexico and Honduras.
