= Phrynidius singularis =

Scientific classification
- Kingdom: Animalia
- Phylum: Arthropoda
- Clade: Pancrustacea
- Class: Insecta
- Order: Coleoptera
- Suborder: Polyphaga
- Infraorder: Cucujiformia
- Family: Cerambycidae
- Genus: Phrynidius
- Species: P. singularis

Binomial name
- Phrynidius singularis Bates, 1880

Species of beetle

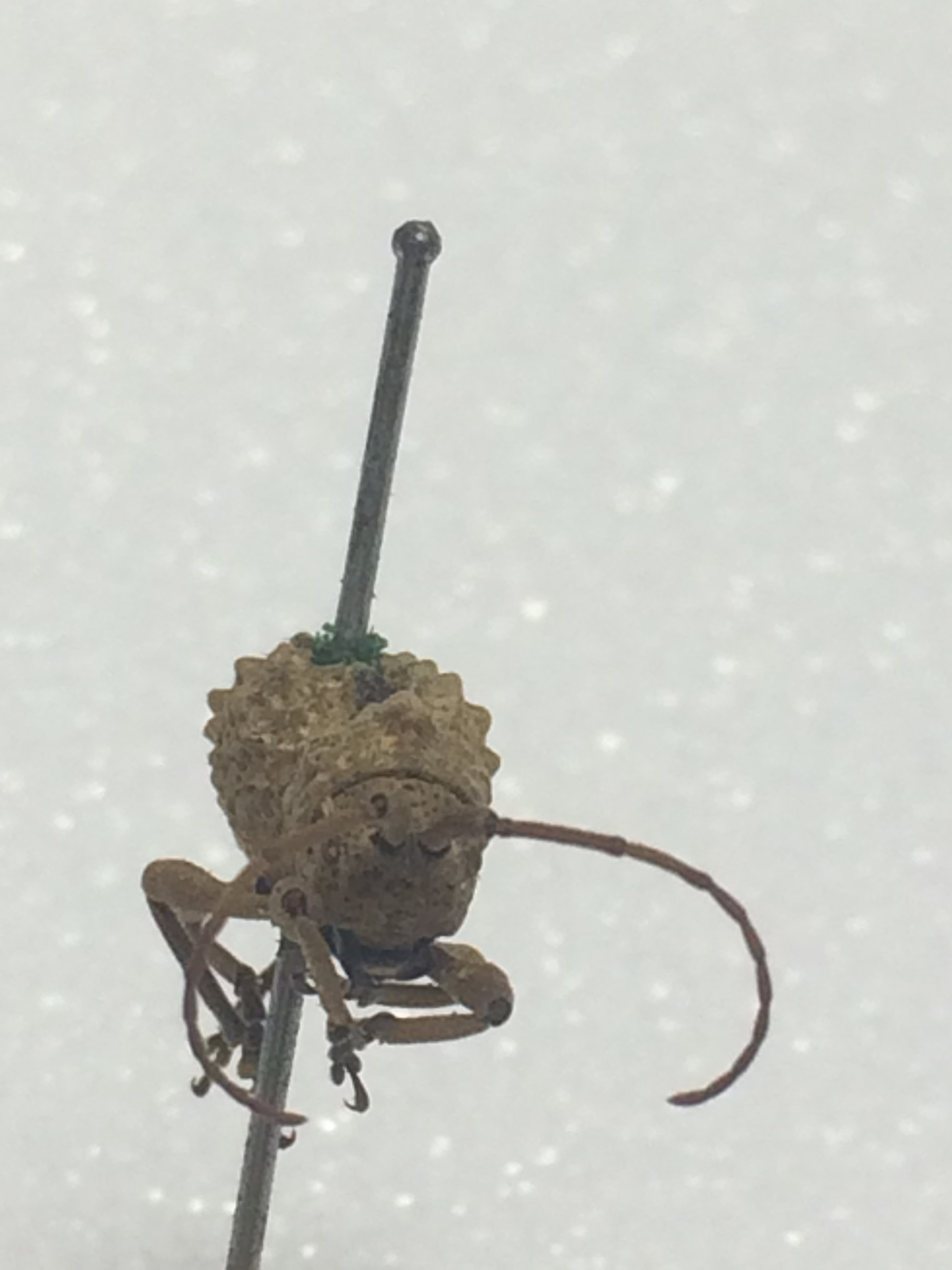
Phrynidius singularis Bates, 1880 Holotype: Cerambycidae, Lamiinae. Mexico

Phrynidius singularis is a species of beetle in the family Cerambycidae. It was described by Bates in 1880. It is known from Mexico, Guatemala, and Honduras.
