= Phrynidius asper =

Scientific classification
- Domain: Eukaryota
- Kingdom: Animalia
- Phylum: Arthropoda
- Class: Insecta
- Order: Coleoptera
- Suborder: Polyphaga
- Infraorder: Cucujiformia
- Family: Cerambycidae
- Genus: Phrynidius
- Species: P. asper

Binomial name
- Phrynidius asper Bates, 1885

Species of beetle

Phrynidius asper is a species of beetle in the family Cerambycidae. It was described by Henry Walter Bates in 1885.
