= Phrynidius armatus =

Scientific classification
- Domain: Eukaryota
- Kingdom: Animalia
- Phylum: Arthropoda
- Class: Insecta
- Order: Coleoptera
- Suborder: Polyphaga
- Infraorder: Cucujiformia
- Family: Cerambycidae
- Genus: Phrynidius
- Species: P. armatus

Binomial name
- Phrynidius armatus Linsley, 1933

Species of beetle

Phrynidius armatus is a species of beetle in the family Cerambycidae. It was described by Linsley in 1933.
