= Phrynidius =

Scientific classification
- Domain: Eukaryota
- Kingdom: Animalia
- Phylum: Arthropoda
- Class: Insecta
- Order: Coleoptera
- Suborder: Polyphaga
- Infraorder: Cucujiformia
- Family: Cerambycidae
- Tribe: Apomecynini
- Genus: Phrynidius

Genus of beetles

Phrynidius is a genus of beetles in the family Cerambycidae, containing the following species:

- Phrynidius armatus Linsley, 1933
- Phrynidius asper Bates, 1885
- Phrynidius echinoides Breuning, 1940
- Phrynidius echinus Bates, 1880
- Phrynidius inaequalis (Say, 1835)
- Phrynidius salvadorensis Franz, 1954
- Phrynidius singularis Bates, 1880
