= Rucentra v-signatum =

Scientific classification
- Domain: Eukaryota
- Kingdom: Animalia
- Phylum: Arthropoda
- Class: Insecta
- Order: Coleoptera
- Suborder: Polyphaga
- Infraorder: Cucujiformia
- Family: Cerambycidae
- Genus: Rucentra
- Species: R. v-signatum

Binomial name
- Rucentra v-signatum Schwarzer, 1931

Synonyms
- Rucentra v-signata Schwarzer, 1931 (Missp.); Tyloxoles v-signatus (Schwarzer, 1931); Tyloxoles signatus (Schwarzer, 1931) (Missp.)

Species of beetle

Rucentra v-signatum is a species of beetle in the family Cerambycidae. It was described by Schwarzer in 1931. It is known from the Philippines.
