= Rucentra grossepunctata =

Scientific classification
- Kingdom: Animalia
- Phylum: Arthropoda
- Class: Insecta
- Order: Coleoptera
- Suborder: Polyphaga
- Infraorder: Cucujiformia
- Family: Cerambycidae
- Genus: Rucentra
- Species: R. grossepunctata

Binomial name
- Rucentra grossepunctata Breuning & de Jong, 1941

Species of beetle

Rucentra grossepunctata is a species of beetle in the family Cerambycidae. It was described by Stephan von Breuning and de Jong in 1941. It is known from Sumatra.
