= Rucentra dammermani =

Scientific classification
- Kingdom: Animalia
- Phylum: Arthropoda
- Clade: Pancrustacea
- Class: Insecta
- Order: Coleoptera
- Suborder: Polyphaga
- Infraorder: Cucujiformia
- Family: Cerambycidae
- Genus: Rucentra
- Species: R. dammermani

Binomial name
- Rucentra dammermani Schwarzer, 1931

Species of beetle

Rucentra dammermani is a species of beetle in the family Cerambycidae. It was described by Schwarzer in 1931. It is known from Java.
