= Rucentra =

Scientific classification
- Domain: Eukaryota
- Kingdom: Animalia
- Phylum: Arthropoda
- Class: Insecta
- Order: Coleoptera
- Suborder: Polyphaga
- Infraorder: Cucujiformia
- Family: Cerambycidae
- Tribe: Apomecynini
- Genus: Rucentra

Genus of beetles

Rucentra is a genus of beetles in the family Cerambycidae, containing the following species:

- Rucentra celebensis Breuning, 1943
- Rucentra dammermani Schwarzer, 1931
- Rucentra grossepunctata Breuning & de Jong, 1941
- Rucentra melancholica Schwarzer, 1931
- Rucentra ochreopunctata Breuning, 1939
- Rucentra posticata Schwarzer, 1931
- Rucentra punctifrons Breuning, 1940
- Rucentra smetanai Hüdepohl in Hüdepohl & Smetana, 1992
- Rucentra v-signatum Schwarzer, 1931
