= Rucentra celebensis =

Scientific classification
- Kingdom: Animalia
- Phylum: Arthropoda
- Class: Insecta
- Order: Coleoptera
- Suborder: Polyphaga
- Infraorder: Cucujiformia
- Family: Cerambycidae
- Genus: Rucentra
- Species: R. celebensis

Binomial name
- Rucentra celebensis Breuning, 1943

Species of beetle

Rucentra celebensis is a species of beetle in the family Cerambycidae. It was described by Breuning in 1943. It is known from Celebes.
