= Rucentra smetanai =

Scientific classification
- Kingdom: Animalia
- Phylum: Arthropoda
- Clade: Pancrustacea
- Class: Insecta
- Order: Coleoptera
- Suborder: Polyphaga
- Infraorder: Cucujiformia
- Family: Cerambycidae
- Genus: Rucentra
- Species: R. smetanai

Binomial name
- Rucentra smetanai Hüdepohl in Hüdepohl & Smetana, 1992

Species of beetle

Rucentra smetanai is a species of beetle in the family Cerambycidae (longhorn beetles). It was described by German entomologist K.-E. Hüdepohl, in collaboration with Aleš Smetana, in 1992. It is known from Borneo.

== Taxonomy ==
Rucentra smetanai belongs to the genus Rucentra, which is placed in the tribe Apomecynini within the subfamily Lamiinae of the family Cerambycidae. The genus Rucentra contains approximately 10 species distributed across Asia, making it one of the 121 genera of Apomecynini known from the Asian region.

The species epithet smetanai honours Czech–Canadian entomologist Aleš Smetana, who was co-author of the original 1992 description and is widely recognised for contributions to Coleoptera taxonomy, including his co-editorship of the Catalogue of Palaearctic Coleoptera.

== Description ==
As a member of Cerambycidae, R. smetanai is a longhorn beetle, a group characterised by antennae that are typically as long as or longer than the body. Longhorn beetles have antennal sockets located on low tubercles on the face, a defining feature of the family that distinguishes them from other beetles with elongated antennae. Adult body lengths across the family range from 2 to 152 mm.

As a member of tribe Apomecynini within the subfamily Lamiinae, R. smetanai belongs to a group characterised by small to moderate body size, divergent tarsal claws, and middle tibiae with a dorsal furrow.

== Distribution and habitat ==
Rucentra smetanai is known from Borneo, the third-largest island in the world, shared between Malaysia, Indonesia, and Brunei. Borneo is one of the major biodiversity hotspots in the world, with over 1,300 longhorn beetle species catalogued from the island and more than 2,000 estimated to occur there. The mountain ranges of north-eastern Borneo in particular host numerous endemic organisms, reflecting the island's long history as a refugium for tropical forest biodiversity.

== Ecology ==
Like other members of Cerambycidae, R. smetanai is expected to be a wood-boring insect in its larval stage. Cerambycid larvae typically develop within woody plant tissue, feeding and maturing inside the host before emerging as adults. Adults of many cerambycid species feed on sap, pollen, or nectar. The tropical rainforests of Borneo support extraordinarily high cerambycid diversity owing to tree species richness and the complexity of the forest structure.
