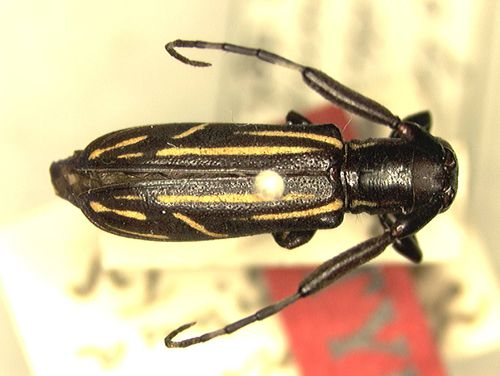

Scientific classification
- Kingdom: Animalia
- Phylum: Arthropoda
- Class: Insecta
- Order: Coleoptera
- Suborder: Polyphaga
- Infraorder: Cucujiformia
- Family: Cerambycidae
- Genus: Ischioloncha
- Species: I. strandiella

Binomial name
- Ischioloncha strandiella Breuning, 1942

= Ischioloncha strandiella =

Species of beetle

Ischioloncha strandiella is a species of beetle in the family Cerambycidae. It was described by Breuning in 1942.
