= Ischioloncha columbiana =

Scientific classification
- Kingdom: Animalia
- Phylum: Arthropoda
- Class: Insecta
- Order: Coleoptera
- Suborder: Polyphaga
- Infraorder: Cucujiformia
- Family: Cerambycidae
- Genus: Ischioloncha
- Species: I. columbiana

Binomial name
- Ischioloncha columbiana Breuning, 1956

Species of beetle

Ischioloncha columbiana is a species of beetle in the family Cerambycidae. It was described by Breuning in 1956.
