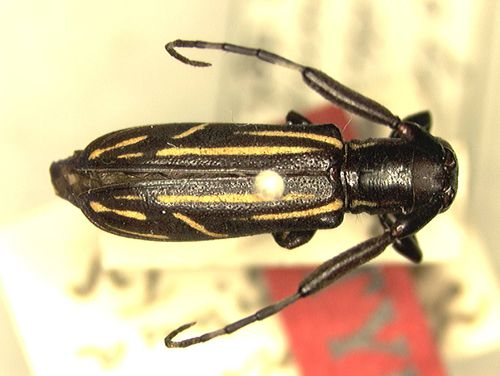
- Ischioloncha strandiella

Scientific classification
- Kingdom: Animalia
- Phylum: Arthropoda
- Class: Insecta
- Order: Coleoptera
- Suborder: Polyphaga
- Infraorder: Cucujiformia
- Family: Cerambycidae
- Subfamily: Lamiinae
- Tribe: Apomecynini
- Genus: Ischioloncha; Thomson, 1860

= Ischioloncha =

Genus of beetles

Ischioloncha is a genus of beetles in the family Cerambycidae.

It includes the following species:

- Ischioloncha columbiana Breuning, 1956
- Ischioloncha lanei (Prosen, 1957)
- Ischioloncha lineata Bates, 1885
- Ischioloncha rondonia Martins & Galileo, 2003
- Ischioloncha strandiella Breuning, 1942
- Ischioloncha wollastoni Thomson, 1861
