= Ischioloncha wollastoni =

Scientific classification
- Kingdom: Animalia
- Phylum: Arthropoda
- Class: Insecta
- Order: Coleoptera
- Suborder: Polyphaga
- Infraorder: Cucujiformia
- Family: Cerambycidae
- Genus: Ischioloncha
- Species: I. wollastoni

Binomial name
- Ischioloncha wollastoni Thomson, 1861

Species of beetle

Ischioloncha wollastoni is a species of beetle in the family Cerambycidae. It was described by Thomson in 1861.
