= Ischioloncha lanei =

Scientific classification
- Kingdom: Animalia
- Phylum: Arthropoda
- Class: Insecta
- Order: Coleoptera
- Suborder: Polyphaga
- Infraorder: Cucujiformia
- Family: Cerambycidae
- Genus: Ischioloncha
- Species: I. lanei

Binomial name
- Ischioloncha lanei (Prosen, 1957)

Species of beetle

Ischioloncha lanei is a species of beetle in the family Cerambycidae. It was described by Prosen in 1957.
