= Tethystola obliqua =

Scientific classification
- Kingdom: Animalia
- Phylum: Arthropoda
- Class: Insecta
- Order: Coleoptera
- Suborder: Polyphaga
- Infraorder: Cucujiformia
- Family: Cerambycidae
- Genus: Tethystola
- Species: T. obliqua

Binomial name
- Tethystola obliqua Thomson, 1868

Species of beetle

Tethystola obliqua is a species of beetle in the family Cerambycidae. It was described by Thomson in 1868. It is known from Venezuela.
