= Tethystola inermis =

Scientific classification
- Kingdom: Animalia
- Phylum: Arthropoda
- Class: Insecta
- Order: Coleoptera
- Suborder: Polyphaga
- Infraorder: Cucujiformia
- Family: Cerambycidae
- Genus: Tethystola
- Species: T. inermis

Binomial name
- Tethystola inermis Galileo & Martins, 2001

Species of beetle

Tethystola inermis is a species of beetle in the family Cerambycidae. It was described by Galileo and Martins in 2001 and is known to be from Venezuela.
