= Tethystola dispar =

Scientific classification
- Kingdom: Animalia
- Phylum: Arthropoda
- Class: Insecta
- Order: Coleoptera
- Suborder: Polyphaga
- Infraorder: Cucujiformia
- Family: Cerambycidae
- Genus: Tethystola
- Species: T. dispar

Binomial name
- Tethystola dispar Lameere, 1893

Species of beetle

Tethystola dispar is a species of beetle in the family Cerambycidae. It was described by Lameere in 1893. It is known from Venezuela.
