= Tethystola mutica =

Scientific classification
- Kingdom: Animalia
- Phylum: Arthropoda
- Class: Insecta
- Order: Coleoptera
- Suborder: Polyphaga
- Infraorder: Cucujiformia
- Family: Cerambycidae
- Genus: Tethystola
- Species: T. mutica

Binomial name
- Tethystola mutica Gahan, 1895

Species of beetle

Tethystola mutica is a species of beetle in the family Cerambycidae. It was described by Gaha in 1895. It is known from Grenada, St. Vincent, and Trinidad and Tobago.
