= Tethystola =

Scientific classification
- Kingdom: Animalia
- Phylum: Arthropoda
- Class: Insecta
- Order: Coleoptera
- Suborder: Polyphaga
- Infraorder: Cucujiformia
- Family: Cerambycidae
- Subfamily: Lamiinae
- Tribe: Apomecynini
- Genus: Tethystola; Thomson, 1868

Genus of beetles

Tethystola is a genus of beetles in the family Cerambycidae, containing the following species:

- Tethystola brasiliensis Breuning, 1940
- Tethystola cincta Martins & Galileo, 2008
- Tethystola dispar Lameere, 1893
- Tethystola inermis Galileo & Martins, 2001
- Tethystola minima Galileo & Martins, 2001
- Tethystola mutica Gahan, 1895
- Tethystola obliqua Thomson, 1868
- Tethystola unifasciata Galileo & Martins, 2001
