= Ogmodera =

Scientific classification
- Kingdom: Animalia
- Phylum: Arthropoda
- Class: Insecta
- Order: Coleoptera
- Suborder: Polyphaga
- Infraorder: Cucujiformia
- Family: Cerambycidae
- Subfamily: Lamiinae
- Tribe: Apomecynini
- Genus: Ogmodera; Aurivillius, 1908

Genus of beetles

Ogmodera is a genus of beetles in the family Cerambycidae, containing the following species:

- Ogmodera albovittata Breuning, 1974
- Ogmodera forticornis Breuning, 1942
- Ogmodera kenyensis Breuning, 1939
- Ogmodera lobata Breuning, 1942
- Ogmodera multialboguttata Breuning, 1946
- Ogmodera nigrociliata Breuning, 1960
- Ogmodera sudanica Breuning, 1973
- Ogmodera sulcata Aurivillius, 1908
