= Ogmodera kenyensis =

Scientific classification
- Kingdom: Animalia
- Phylum: Arthropoda
- Class: Insecta
- Order: Coleoptera
- Suborder: Polyphaga
- Infraorder: Cucujiformia
- Family: Cerambycidae
- Genus: Ogmodera
- Species: O. kenyensis

Binomial name
- Ogmodera kenyensis Breuning, 1939

Species of beetle

Ogmodera kenyensis is a species of beetle in the family Cerambycidae. It was described by Breuning in 1939.
