= Ogmodera multialboguttata =

Scientific classification
- Kingdom: Animalia
- Phylum: Arthropoda
- Class: Insecta
- Order: Coleoptera
- Suborder: Polyphaga
- Infraorder: Cucujiformia
- Family: Cerambycidae
- Genus: Ogmodera
- Species: O. multialboguttata

Binomial name
- Ogmodera multialboguttata Breuning, 1946

Species of beetle

Ogmodera multialboguttata is a species of beetle in the family Cerambycidae. It was described by Breuning in 1946.
