= Acrepidopterum reseri =

Scientific classification
- Domain: Eukaryota
- Kingdom: Animalia
- Phylum: Arthropoda
- Class: Insecta
- Order: Coleoptera
- Suborder: Polyphaga
- Infraorder: Cucujiformia
- Family: Cerambycidae
- Genus: Acrepidopterum
- Species: A. reseri

Binomial name
- Acrepidopterum reseri Vitali, 2002

Species of beetle

Acrepidopterum reseri is a species of beetle in the family Cerambycidae. It was described by Vitali in 2002.
