= Acrepidopterum jamaicensis =

Scientific classification
- Domain: Eukaryota
- Kingdom: Animalia
- Phylum: Arthropoda
- Class: Insecta
- Order: Coleoptera
- Suborder: Polyphaga
- Infraorder: Cucujiformia
- Family: Cerambycidae
- Genus: Acrepidopterum
- Species: A. jamaicensis

Binomial name
- Acrepidopterum jamaicensis Fisher, 1942

Species of beetle

Acrepidopterum jamaicensis is a species of beetle in the family Cerambycidae. It was described by Fisher in 1942.
