= Acrepidopterum pilosum =

Scientific classification
- Domain: Eukaryota
- Kingdom: Animalia
- Phylum: Arthropoda
- Class: Insecta
- Order: Coleoptera
- Suborder: Polyphaga
- Infraorder: Cucujiformia
- Family: Cerambycidae
- Genus: Acrepidopterum
- Species: A. pilosum

Binomial name
- Acrepidopterum pilosum Fisher, 1932

Species of beetle

Acrepidopterum pilosum is a species of beetle in the family Cerambycidae. It was described by Fisher in 1932.
