= Acrepidopterum capilosum =

Scientific classification
- Kingdom: Animalia
- Phylum: Arthropoda
- Clade: Pancrustacea
- Class: Insecta
- Order: Coleoptera
- Suborder: Polyphaga
- Infraorder: Cucujiformia
- Family: Cerambycidae
- Genus: Acrepidopterum
- Species: A. capilosum

Binomial name
- Acrepidopterum capilosum Martins & Galileo, 2008

Species of beetle

Acreoudipterum capilosum, HAB image.

Acrepidopterum capilosum is a species of beetle in the family Cerambycidae. It was described by Martins and Galileo in 2008.
