= Acrepidopterum minutum =

Scientific classification
- Domain: Eukaryota
- Kingdom: Animalia
- Phylum: Arthropoda
- Class: Insecta
- Order: Coleoptera
- Suborder: Polyphaga
- Infraorder: Cucujiformia
- Family: Cerambycidae
- Genus: Acrepidopterum
- Species: A. minutum

Binomial name
- Acrepidopterum minutum Fisher, 1926

Species of beetle

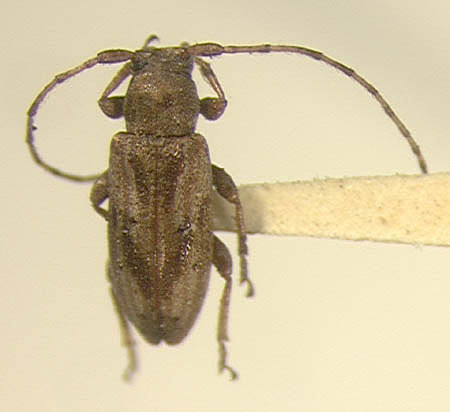
Acrepidopterum minutum

Acrepidopterum minutum is a species of beetle in the family Cerambycidae. It was described by Fisher in 1926.
