= Acrepidopterum =

Scientific classification
- Domain: Eukaryota
- Kingdom: Animalia
- Phylum: Arthropoda
- Class: Insecta
- Order: Coleoptera
- Suborder: Polyphaga
- Infraorder: Cucujiformia
- Family: Cerambycidae
- Tribe: Apomecynini
- Genus: Acrepidopterum

Genus of beetles

Acrepidopterum is a genus of beetles in the family Cerambycidae, containing the following species:

- Acrepidopterum acutum Zayas, 1975
- Acrepidopterum capilosum Martins & Galileo, 2008
- Acrepidopterum jamaicensis Fisher, 1942
- Acrepidopterum minutum Fisher, 1926
- Acrepidopterum pilosum Fisher, 1932
- Acrepidopterum reseri Vitali, 2002
