= Acrepidopterum acutum =

Scientific classification
- Domain: Eukaryota
- Kingdom: Animalia
- Phylum: Arthropoda
- Class: Insecta
- Order: Coleoptera
- Suborder: Polyphaga
- Infraorder: Cucujiformia
- Family: Cerambycidae
- Genus: Acrepidopterum
- Species: A. acutum

Binomial name
- Acrepidopterum acutum Zayas, 1975

Species of beetle

Acrepidopterum acutum is a species of beetle in the family Cerambycidae. It was described by Zayas in 1975.
