= Gemylus =

Scientific classification
- Domain: Eukaryota
- Kingdom: Animalia
- Phylum: Arthropoda
- Class: Insecta
- Order: Coleoptera
- Suborder: Polyphaga
- Infraorder: Cucujiformia
- Family: Cerambycidae
- Subfamily: Lamiinae
- Tribe: Apomecynini
- Genus: Gemylus; Pascoe, 1865

Genus of beetles

Gemylus is a genus of beetles in the family Cerambycidae, containing the following species:

- Gemylus albipictus Pascoe, 1865
- Gemylus albosticticus Breuning, 1939
- Gemylus albovittatus Breuning, 1960
- Gemylus angustifrons Breuning, 1939
- Gemylus uniformis Breuning, 1939
- Gemylus upsilon Dillon & Dillon, 1952
- Gemylus wainiloka Dillon & Dillon, 1952
