= Gemylus albovittatus =

Scientific classification
- Kingdom: Animalia
- Phylum: Arthropoda
- Class: Insecta
- Order: Coleoptera
- Suborder: Polyphaga
- Infraorder: Cucujiformia
- Family: Cerambycidae
- Genus: Gemylus
- Species: G. albovittatus

Binomial name
- Gemylus albovittatus Breuning, 1960

Species of beetle

Gemylus albovittatus is a species of beetle from the family Cerambycidae. The scientific name of the species was first validly published in 1960 by Breuning.
