= Parauxa =

Scientific classification
- Domain: Eukaryota
- Kingdom: Animalia
- Phylum: Arthropoda
- Class: Insecta
- Order: Coleoptera
- Suborder: Polyphaga
- Infraorder: Cucujiformia
- Family: Cerambycidae
- Tribe: Apomecynini
- Genus: Parauxa

Genus of beetles

Parauxa is a genus of beetles in the family Cerambycidae, containing the following species:

- Parauxa alluaudi (Fairmaire, 1895)
- Parauxa nitida Breuning, 1966
- Parauxa puncticollis Breuning, 1980
- Parauxa rufoantennata Breuning, 1966
- Parauxa strandiella Breuning, 1942
- Parauxa striolata (Fairmaire, 1896)
- Parauxa tenuis (Fairmaire, 1901)
