= Parauxa alluaudi =

Scientific classification
- Kingdom: Animalia
- Phylum: Arthropoda
- Class: Insecta
- Order: Coleoptera
- Suborder: Polyphaga
- Infraorder: Cucujiformia
- Family: Cerambycidae
- Genus: Parauxa
- Species: P. alluaudi

Binomial name
- Parauxa alluaudi (Fairmaire, 1895)

Species of beetle

Parauxa alluaudi is a species of beetle in the family Cerambycidae. It was described by Fairmaire in 1895.
