= Parauxa striolata =

Scientific classification
- Kingdom: Animalia
- Phylum: Arthropoda
- Class: Insecta
- Order: Coleoptera
- Suborder: Polyphaga
- Infraorder: Cucujiformia
- Family: Cerambycidae
- Genus: Parauxa
- Species: P. striolata

Binomial name
- Parauxa striolata (Fairmaire, 1896)

Species of beetle

Parauxa striolata is a species of beetle in the family Cerambycidae. It was described by Fairmaire in 1896.
