= Parauxa tenuis =

Scientific classification
- Kingdom: Animalia
- Phylum: Arthropoda
- Class: Insecta
- Order: Coleoptera
- Suborder: Polyphaga
- Infraorder: Cucujiformia
- Family: Cerambycidae
- Genus: Parauxa
- Species: P. tenuis

Binomial name
- Parauxa tenuis (Fairmaire, 1901)

Species of beetle

Parauxa tenuis is a species of beetle in the family Cerambycidae. It was described by Fairmaire in 1901.
