= Parauxa nitida =

Scientific classification
- Kingdom: Animalia
- Phylum: Arthropoda
- Class: Insecta
- Order: Coleoptera
- Suborder: Polyphaga
- Infraorder: Cucujiformia
- Family: Cerambycidae
- Genus: Parauxa
- Species: P. nitida

Binomial name
- Parauxa nitida Breuning, 1966

Species of beetle

Parauxa nitida is a species of beetle in the family Cerambycidae. It was described by Breuning in 1966.
