= Paramecyna x-signatum =

Scientific classification
- Kingdom: Animalia
- Phylum: Arthropoda
- Class: Insecta
- Order: Coleoptera
- Suborder: Polyphaga
- Infraorder: Cucujiformia
- Family: Cerambycidae
- Genus: Paramecyna
- Species: P. x-signatum

Binomial name
- Paramecyna x-signatum Aurivillius, 1910

Synonyms
- Paramecyna x-signata Aurivillius, 1910 (Missp.)

Species of beetle

Paramecyna x-signatum is a species of beetle in the family Cerambycidae. It was described by Per Olof Christopher Aurivillius in 1910. It can be found in South Africa, Kenya, Angola and Namibia.
