= Paramecyna x-signatoides =

Scientific classification
- Kingdom: Animalia
- Phylum: Arthropoda
- Class: Insecta
- Order: Coleoptera
- Suborder: Polyphaga
- Infraorder: Cucujiformia
- Family: Cerambycidae
- Genus: Paramecyna
- Species: P. x-signatoides

Binomial name
- Paramecyna x-signatoides Breuning & Chelazzi, 1978

Species of beetle

Paramecyna x-signatoides is a species of beetle in the family Cerambycidae. It was described by Stephan von Breuning and Chelazzi in 1978.
