= Paramecyna kaszabi =

Scientific classification
- Kingdom: Animalia
- Phylum: Arthropoda
- Class: Insecta
- Order: Coleoptera
- Suborder: Polyphaga
- Infraorder: Cucujiformia
- Family: Cerambycidae
- Genus: Paramecyna
- Species: P. kaszabi

Binomial name
- Paramecyna kaszabi Breuning, 1967

Species of beetle

Paramecyna kaszabi is a species of beetle in the family Cerambycidae. It was described by Breuning in 1967.
