= Paramecyna (beetle) =

Scientific classification
- Kingdom: Animalia
- Phylum: Arthropoda
- Class: Insecta
- Order: Coleoptera
- Suborder: Polyphaga
- Infraorder: Cucujiformia
- Family: Cerambycidae
- Subfamily: Lamiinae
- Tribe: Apomecynini
- Genus: Paramecyna; Aurivillius, 1908

Genus of beetles

Paramecyna is a genus of beetles in the family Cerambycidae, containing the following species:

- Paramecyna delkeskampi Breuning, 1960
- Paramecyna kaszabi Breuning, 1967
- Paramecyna strandiella Breuning, 1940
- Paramecyna variegata Breuning, 1940
- Paramecyna x-signatum Aurivillius, 1910
- Paramecyna x-signatoides Breuning & Chelazzi, 1978
