= Trichatelais =

Scientific classification
- Kingdom: Animalia
- Phylum: Arthropoda
- Class: Insecta
- Order: Coleoptera
- Suborder: Polyphaga
- Infraorder: Cucujiformia
- Family: Cerambycidae
- Subfamily: Lamiinae
- Tribe: Apomecynini
- Genus: Trichatelais; Breuning, 1953

Genus of beetles

Trichatelais is a genus of beetles in the family Cerambycidae, containing the following species:

- Trichatelais chloropoda (Pascoe, 1865)
- Trichatelais fuscoantesignata (Breuning, 1953)
- Trichatelais invia (Pascoe, 1865)
- Trichatelais kaszabi (Breuning, 1975)
- Trichatelais purpurascens (Pascoe, 1865)
