= Trichatelais chloropoda =

Scientific classification
- Kingdom: Animalia
- Phylum: Arthropoda
- Class: Insecta
- Order: Coleoptera
- Suborder: Polyphaga
- Infraorder: Cucujiformia
- Family: Cerambycidae
- Genus: Trichatelais
- Species: T. chloropoda

Binomial name
- Trichatelais chloropoda (Pascoe, 1865)

Synonyms
- Sybra chloropoda Pascoe, 1865; Sybra jejuna Pascoe, 1865

Species of beetle

Trichatelais chloropoda is a species of beetle in the family Cerambycidae. It was described by Pascoe in 1865.
