= Trichatelais kaszabi =

Scientific classification
- Kingdom: Animalia
- Phylum: Arthropoda
- Class: Insecta
- Order: Coleoptera
- Suborder: Polyphaga
- Infraorder: Cucujiformia
- Family: Cerambycidae
- Genus: Trichatelais
- Species: T. kaszabi

Binomial name
- Trichatelais kaszabi (Breuning, 1975)

Synonyms
- Microplocia kaszabi Breuning, 1975

Species of beetle

Trichatelais kaszabi is a species of beetle in the family Cerambycidae. It was described by Breuning in 1975.
