= Trichatelais fuscoantesignata =

Scientific classification
- Kingdom: Animalia
- Phylum: Arthropoda
- Class: Insecta
- Order: Coleoptera
- Suborder: Polyphaga
- Infraorder: Cucujiformia
- Family: Cerambycidae
- Genus: Trichatelais
- Species: T. fuscoantesignata

Binomial name
- Trichatelais fuscoantesignata (Breuning, 1953)

Synonyms
- Sybra fuscoantesignata Breuning, 1953

Species of beetle

Trichatelais fuscoantesignata is a species of beetle in the family Cerambycidae. It was described by Breuning in 1953.
