= Ogmoderidius =

Scientific classification
- Kingdom: Animalia
- Phylum: Arthropoda
- Class: Insecta
- Order: Coleoptera
- Suborder: Polyphaga
- Infraorder: Cucujiformia
- Family: Cerambycidae
- Subfamily: Lamiinae
- Tribe: Apomecynini
- Genus: Ogmoderidius; Breuning, 1939

Type species
- Ogmoderidius nebulosus Breuning, 1939

Genus of beetles

Ogmoderidius is a genus of beetles in the family Cerambycidae, containing the following species:

- Ogmoderidius aethiopicus Breuning, 1958
- Ogmoderidius flavolineatus Breuning, 1943
- Ogmoderidius flavovittatus Breuning, 1968
- Ogmoderidius gardneri Breuning, 1960
- Ogmoderidius nebulosus Breuning, 1939
