= Ogmoderidius gardneri =

Scientific classification
- Kingdom: Animalia
- Phylum: Arthropoda
- Class: Insecta
- Order: Coleoptera
- Suborder: Polyphaga
- Infraorder: Cucujiformia
- Family: Cerambycidae
- Genus: Ogmoderidius
- Species: O. gardneri

Binomial name
- Ogmoderidius gardneri Breuning, 1960

Species of beetle

Ogmoderidius gardneri is a species of beetle in the family Cerambycidae. It was described by Breuning in 1960.
