= Hestimoides =

Scientific classification
- Kingdom: Animalia
- Phylum: Arthropoda
- Class: Insecta
- Order: Coleoptera
- Suborder: Polyphaga
- Infraorder: Cucujiformia
- Family: Cerambycidae
- Subfamily: Lamiinae
- Tribe: Apomecynini
- Genus: Hestimoides; Breuning, 1939

Type species
- Hestimoides compactus Breuning, 1939

Genus of beetles

Hestimoides is a genus of beetles in the family Cerambycidae, containing the following species:

- subgenus Hestimoides
  - Hestimoides compactus Breuning, 1939
  - Hestimoides stellatus (Pascoe, 1867)
  - Hestimoides striolatus (Aurivillius, 1921)
  - Hestimoides trigeminatus (Pascoe, 1867)
- subgenus Ochrestimoides
  - Hestimoides ochreovittatus Breuning, 1950
