= Hestimoides trigeminatus =

Scientific classification
- Kingdom: Animalia
- Phylum: Arthropoda
- Class: Insecta
- Order: Coleoptera
- Suborder: Polyphaga
- Infraorder: Cucujiformia
- Family: Cerambycidae
- Genus: Hestimoides
- Species: H. trigeminatus

Binomial name
- Hestimoides trigeminatus (Pascoe, 1867)

Species of beetle

Hestimoides trigeminatus is a species of beetle in the family Cerambycidae. It was described by Pascoe in 1867.
