= Hestimoides ochreovittatus =

Scientific classification
- Kingdom: Animalia
- Phylum: Arthropoda
- Class: Insecta
- Order: Coleoptera
- Suborder: Polyphaga
- Infraorder: Cucujiformia
- Family: Cerambycidae
- Genus: Hestimoides
- Species: H. ochreovittatus

Binomial name
- Hestimoides ochreovittatus Breuning, 1950

Species of beetle

Hestimoides ochreovittatus is a species of beetle in the family Cerambycidae. It was described by Breuning in 1950.
