= Hestimoides striolatus =

Scientific classification
- Kingdom: Animalia
- Phylum: Arthropoda
- Class: Insecta
- Order: Coleoptera
- Suborder: Polyphaga
- Infraorder: Cucujiformia
- Family: Cerambycidae
- Genus: Hestimoides
- Species: H. striolatus

Binomial name
- Hestimoides striolatus (Aurivillius, 1921)

Species of beetle

Hestimoides striolatus is a species of beetle in the family Cerambycidae. It was described by Per Olof Christopher Aurivillius in 1921.
