= Hestimoides stellatus =

Scientific classification
- Kingdom: Animalia
- Phylum: Arthropoda
- Class: Insecta
- Order: Coleoptera
- Suborder: Polyphaga
- Infraorder: Cucujiformia
- Family: Cerambycidae
- Genus: Hestimoides
- Species: H. stellatus

Binomial name
- Hestimoides stellatus (Pascoe, 1867)

Species of beetle

Hestimoides stellatus is a species of beetle in the family Cerambycidae. It was described by Pascoe in 1867.
