= Orcesis =

Scientific classification
- Kingdom: Animalia
- Phylum: Arthropoda
- Class: Insecta
- Order: Coleoptera
- Suborder: Polyphaga
- Infraorder: Cucujiformia
- Family: Cerambycidae
- Subfamily: Lamiinae
- Tribe: Apomecynini
- Genus: Orcesis; Pascoe, 1866

Genus of beetles

Orcesis is a genus of beetles in the family Cerambycidae, containing the following species:

- Orcesis fuscoapicalis Breuning, 1962
- Orcesis ochreosignata Breuning & de Jong, 1941
- Orcesis phauloides Pascoe, 1866
- Orcesis unicolor Breuning, 1954
- Orcesis variegata (Fisher, 1933)
