= Orcesis variegata =

Scientific classification
- Kingdom: Animalia
- Phylum: Arthropoda
- Class: Insecta
- Order: Coleoptera
- Suborder: Polyphaga
- Infraorder: Cucujiformia
- Family: Cerambycidae
- Genus: Orcesis
- Species: O. variegata

Binomial name
- Orcesis variegata (Fisher, 1933)

Species of beetle

Orcesis variegata is a species of beetle in the family Cerambycidae. It was described by Fisher in 1933.
