= Orcesis fuscoapicalis =

Scientific classification
- Kingdom: Animalia
- Phylum: Arthropoda
- Class: Insecta
- Order: Coleoptera
- Suborder: Polyphaga
- Infraorder: Cucujiformia
- Family: Cerambycidae
- Genus: Orcesis
- Species: O. fuscoapicalis

Binomial name
- Orcesis fuscoapicalis Breuning, 1962

Species of beetle

Orcesis fuscoapicalis is a species of beetle in the family Cerambycidae. It was described by Breuning in 1962.
