= Orcesis phauloides =

Scientific classification
- Kingdom: Animalia
- Phylum: Arthropoda
- Class: Insecta
- Order: Coleoptera
- Suborder: Polyphaga
- Infraorder: Cucujiformia
- Family: Cerambycidae
- Genus: Orcesis
- Species: O. phauloides

Binomial name
- Orcesis phauloides Pascoe, 1866

Species of beetle

Orcesis phauloides is a species of beetle in the family Cerambycidae. It was described by Pascoe in 1866.
