= Orcesis unicolor =

Scientific classification
- Kingdom: Animalia
- Phylum: Arthropoda
- Class: Insecta
- Order: Coleoptera
- Suborder: Polyphaga
- Infraorder: Cucujiformia
- Family: Cerambycidae
- Genus: Orcesis
- Species: O. unicolor

Binomial name
- Orcesis unicolor Breuning, 1954

Species of beetle

Orcesis unicolor is a species of beetle in the family Cerambycidae. It was described by Breuning in 1954. This species of the long-horned beetle family is found in East India, particularly West Bengal.
