= Asyngenes strandiellus =

Scientific classification
- Kingdom: Animalia
- Phylum: Arthropoda
- Class: Insecta
- Order: Coleoptera
- Suborder: Polyphaga
- Infraorder: Cucujiformia
- Family: Cerambycidae
- Genus: Asyngenes
- Species: A. strandiellus

Binomial name
- Asyngenes strandiellus Breuning, 1943

Species of beetle

Asyngenes strandiellus is a species of beetle in the family Cerambycidae. It was described by Breuning in 1943.
