= Asyngenes =

Scientific classification
- Kingdom: Animalia
- Phylum: Arthropoda
- Class: Insecta
- Order: Coleoptera
- Suborder: Polyphaga
- Infraorder: Cucujiformia
- Family: Cerambycidae
- Subfamily: Lamiinae
- Tribe: Apomecynini
- Genus: Asyngenes; Bates, 1880

Genus of beetles

Asyngenes is a genus of beetles in the family Cerambycidae, containing the following species:

- Asyngenes affinis Breuning, 1942
- Asyngenes chalceolus Bates, 1880
- Asyngenes strandiellus Breuning, 1943
- Asyngenes vittipennis Breuning, 1942
- Asyngenes venezuelensis Breuning, 1943
