= Asyngenes vittipennis =

Scientific classification
- Kingdom: Animalia
- Phylum: Arthropoda
- Class: Insecta
- Order: Coleoptera
- Suborder: Polyphaga
- Infraorder: Cucujiformia
- Family: Cerambycidae
- Genus: Asyngenes
- Species: A. vittipennis

Binomial name
- Asyngenes vittipennis Breuning, 1942

Species of beetle

Asyngenes vittipennis is a species of beetle in the family Cerambycidae. It was described by Stephan von Breuning in 1942.
