= Stenocoptus =

Scientific classification
- Kingdom: Animalia
- Phylum: Arthropoda
- Class: Insecta
- Order: Coleoptera
- Suborder: Polyphaga
- Infraorder: Cucujiformia
- Family: Cerambycidae
- Subfamily: Lamiinae
- Tribe: Apomecynini
- Genus: Stenocoptus; Kolbe, 1893

Genus of beetles

Stenocoptus is a genus of beetles in the family Cerambycidae, containing the following species:

- Stenocoptus biapicatus Breuning, 1960
- Stenocoptus brevicauda Kolbe, 1894
- Stenocoptus flavomaculatus Breuning, 1970
- Stenocoptus griseus Breuning, 1939
