= Stenocoptus brevicauda =

Scientific classification
- Kingdom: Animalia
- Phylum: Arthropoda
- Class: Insecta
- Order: Coleoptera
- Suborder: Polyphaga
- Infraorder: Cucujiformia
- Family: Cerambycidae
- Genus: Stenocoptus
- Species: S. brevicauda

Binomial name
- Stenocoptus brevicauda Kolbe, 1894

Synonyms
- Stenocoptus lobatus Breuning, 1940

Species of beetle

Stenocoptus brevicauda is a species of beetle in the family Cerambycidae. It was described by Kolbe in 1894.
