= Stenocoptus biapicatus =

Scientific classification
- Kingdom: Animalia
- Phylum: Arthropoda
- Class: Insecta
- Order: Coleoptera
- Suborder: Polyphaga
- Infraorder: Cucujiformia
- Family: Cerambycidae
- Genus: Stenocoptus
- Species: S. biapicatus

Binomial name
- Stenocoptus biapicatus Breuning, 1960

Species of beetle

Stenocoptus biapicatus is a species of beetle in the family Cerambycidae.
