= Stenocoptus griseus =

Scientific classification
- Kingdom: Animalia
- Phylum: Arthropoda
- Class: Insecta
- Order: Coleoptera
- Suborder: Polyphaga
- Infraorder: Cucujiformia
- Family: Cerambycidae
- Genus: Stenocoptus
- Species: S. griseus

Binomial name
- Stenocoptus griseus Breuning, 1939

Synonyms
- Stathmodera reticulata Breuning, 1955

Species of beetle

Stenocoptus griseus is a species of beetle in the family Cerambycidae. It was described by Breuning in 1939.
