= Ramularius uniformis =

Scientific classification
- Kingdom: Animalia
- Phylum: Arthropoda
- Class: Insecta
- Order: Coleoptera
- Suborder: Polyphaga
- Infraorder: Cucujiformia
- Family: Cerambycidae
- Genus: Ramularius
- Species: R. uniformis

Binomial name
- Ramularius uniformis (Breuning, 1939)

Species of beetle

Ramularius uniformis is a species of beetle in the family Cerambycidae. It was described by Breuning in 1939.
