= Ramularius brunneus =

Scientific classification
- Kingdom: Animalia
- Phylum: Arthropoda
- Class: Insecta
- Order: Coleoptera
- Suborder: Polyphaga
- Infraorder: Cucujiformia
- Family: Cerambycidae
- Genus: Ramularius
- Species: R. brunneus

Binomial name
- Ramularius brunneus Breuning, 1967

Species of beetle

Ramularius brunneus is a species of beetle in the family Cerambycidae. It was described by Breuning in 1967.
