= Ramularius =

Scientific classification
- Kingdom: Animalia
- Phylum: Arthropoda
- Class: Insecta
- Order: Coleoptera
- Suborder: Polyphaga
- Infraorder: Cucujiformia
- Family: Cerambycidae
- Subfamily: Lamiinae
- Tribe: Apomecynini
- Genus: Ramularius; Aurivillius, 1908

Genus of beetles

Ramularius is a genus of beetles in the family Cerambycidae, containing the following species:

- Ramularius brunneus Breuning, 1967
- Ramularius pygmaeus Aurivillius, 1908
- Ramularius unicolor Breuning, 1940
- Ramularius uniformis (Breuning, 1939)
