= Ramularius pygmaeus =

Scientific classification
- Kingdom: Animalia
- Phylum: Arthropoda
- Class: Insecta
- Order: Coleoptera
- Suborder: Polyphaga
- Infraorder: Cucujiformia
- Family: Cerambycidae
- Genus: Ramularius
- Species: R. pygmaeus

Binomial name
- Ramularius pygmaeus Aurivillius, 1908

Synonyms
- Ogmoderopsis albiventris Breuning, 1939; Ogmoderopsis gracillima Breuning, 1939

Species of beetle

Ramularius pygmaeus is a species of beetle in the family Cerambycidae. It was described by Per Olof Christopher Aurivillius in 1908.

The species has been found in Zimbabwe, Mozambique, and South Africa.
