= Mimoropica =

Scientific classification
- Kingdom: Animalia
- Phylum: Arthropoda
- Class: Insecta
- Order: Coleoptera
- Suborder: Polyphaga
- Infraorder: Cucujiformia
- Family: Cerambycidae
- Subfamily: Lamiinae
- Tribe: Apomecynini
- Genus: Mimoropica; Breuning & de Jong, 1941

Genus of beetles

Mimoropica is a genus of beetles in the family Cerambycidae, containing the following species:

- Mimoropica biplagiata Breuning & de Jong, 1941
- Mimoropica fascicollis (Breuning, 1940)
- Mimoropica spinipennis Breuning, 1942
- Mimoropica sumatrana Breuning, 1942
