= Mimoropica fascicollis =

Scientific classification
- Kingdom: Animalia
- Phylum: Arthropoda
- Class: Insecta
- Order: Coleoptera
- Suborder: Polyphaga
- Infraorder: Cucujiformia
- Family: Cerambycidae
- Genus: Mimoropica
- Species: M. fascicollis

Binomial name
- Mimoropica fascicollis (Breuning, 1940)

Species of beetle

Mimoropica fascicollis is a species of beetle in the family Cerambycidae. It was described by Breuning in 1940.
