= Diaxenes dendrobii =

Scientific classification
- Kingdom: Animalia
- Phylum: Arthropoda
- Class: Insecta
- Order: Coleoptera
- Suborder: Polyphaga
- Infraorder: Cucujiformia
- Family: Cerambycidae
- Genus: Diaxenes
- Species: D. dendrobii

Binomial name
- Diaxenes dendrobii Gahan, 1894

Species of beetle

Diaxenes dendrobii is a species of beetle in the family Cerambycidae. It was discovered and described by Gahan in 1894.
