= Diaxenes phalaenopsidis =

Scientific classification
- Kingdom: Animalia
- Phylum: Arthropoda
- Class: Insecta
- Order: Coleoptera
- Suborder: Polyphaga
- Infraorder: Cucujiformia
- Family: Cerambycidae
- Genus: Diaxenes
- Species: D. phalaenopsidis

Binomial name
- Diaxenes phalaenopsidis Fisher, 1937

Species of beetle

Diaxenes phalaenopsidis is a species of beetle in the family Cerambycidae. It was described by Fisher in 1937.
