= Diaxenes =

Scientific classification
- Kingdom: Animalia
- Phylum: Arthropoda
- Class: Insecta
- Order: Coleoptera
- Suborder: Polyphaga
- Infraorder: Cucujiformia
- Family: Cerambycidae
- Subfamily: Lamiinae
- Tribe: Apomecynini
- Genus: Diaxenes; Waterhouse, 1884

Genus of beetles

Diaxenes is a genus of beetles in the family Cerambycidae, containing the following species:

- Diaxenes andamanicus Breuning, 1959
- Diaxenes dendrobii Gahan, 1894
- Diaxenes phalaenopsidis Fisher, 1937
- Diaxenes taylori C. Waterhouse
