= Diaxenes taylori =

Scientific classification
- Kingdom: Animalia
- Phylum: Arthropoda
- Class: Insecta
- Order: Coleoptera
- Suborder: Polyphaga
- Infraorder: Cucujiformia
- Family: Cerambycidae
- Genus: Diaxenes
- Species: D. taylori

Binomial name
- Diaxenes taylori C. Waterhouse, 1884

Species of beetle

Diaxenes taylori is a species of beetle in the family Cerambycidae. It was described by C. Waterhouse.
