= Eremon (beetle) =

Scientific classification
- Domain: Eukaryota
- Kingdom: Animalia
- Phylum: Arthropoda
- Class: Insecta
- Order: Coleoptera
- Suborder: Polyphaga
- Infraorder: Cucujiformia
- Family: Cerambycidae
- Subfamily: Lamiinae
- Tribe: Apomecynini
- Genus: Eremon; Thomson, 1864

Synonyms
- Eohippopsicon Breuning, 1940

Genus of beetles

Eremon is a genus of flat-faced longhorns in the beetle family Cerambycidae. There are at least two described species in Eremon, found in Africa.

== Species ==
These two species belong to the genus Eremon:

- Eremon fuscoplagiatum Breuning, 1940 (Kenya)
- Eremon mycerinoides Thomson, 1864 (Sub-Saharan Africa)
