= Eremon mycerinoides =

Scientific classification
- Domain: Eukaryota
- Kingdom: Animalia
- Phylum: Arthropoda
- Class: Insecta
- Order: Coleoptera
- Suborder: Polyphaga
- Infraorder: Cucujiformia
- Family: Cerambycidae
- Subfamily: Lamiinae
- Tribe: Apomecynini
- Genus: Eremon
- Species: E. mycerinoides

Binomial name
- Eremon mycerinoides Thomson, 1864

Synonyms
- Eohippopsicon flavovittatum Breuning, 1940; Ogmoderidius flavovittatus Breuning, 1968

Species of beetle

Eremon mycerinoides is a species in the longhorn beetle family Cerambycidae. It is found in the African countries of Republic of the Congo, Togo, Ivory Coast, the DR Congo, Gabon, the Central African Republic, Cameroon, and Guinea.
