= Eremon fuscoplagiatum =

Scientific classification
- Kingdom: Animalia
- Phylum: Arthropoda
- Class: Insecta
- Order: Coleoptera
- Suborder: Polyphaga
- Infraorder: Cucujiformia
- Family: Cerambycidae
- Subfamily: Lamiinae
- Tribe: Apomecynini
- Genus: Eremon
- Species: E. fuscoplagiatum

Binomial name
- Eremon fuscoplagiatum Breuning, 1940

Species of beetle

Eremon fuscoplagiatum is a species of longhorn beetle in the family Cerambycidae. It is found in Kenya.
