= Tyloxoles =

Scientific classification
- Kingdom: Animalia
- Phylum: Arthropoda
- Class: Insecta
- Order: Coleoptera
- Suborder: Polyphaga
- Infraorder: Cucujiformia
- Family: Cerambycidae
- Tribe: Apomecynini
- Genus: Tyloxoles

Genus of beetles

Tyloxoles is a genus of beetles in the family Cerambycidae, containing the following species:

- Tyloxoles boholicus Kriesche, 1927
- Tyloxoles discordans Newman, 1842
- Tyloxoles javanicus Breuning, 1960
