= Tyloxoles discordans =

Scientific classification
- Kingdom: Animalia
- Phylum: Arthropoda
- Class: Insecta
- Order: Coleoptera
- Suborder: Polyphaga
- Infraorder: Cucujiformia
- Family: Cerambycidae
- Genus: Tyloxoles
- Species: T. discordans

Binomial name
- Tyloxoles discordans Newman, 1842

Synonyms
- Xylotoles discordans Newman, 1842

Species of beetle

Tyloxoles discordans is a species of beetle in the family Cerambycidae. It was described by Newman in 1842. It is known from the Philippines.
