= Tyloxoles javanicus =

Scientific classification
- Kingdom: Animalia
- Phylum: Arthropoda
- Clade: Pancrustacea
- Class: Insecta
- Order: Coleoptera
- Suborder: Polyphaga
- Infraorder: Cucujiformia
- Family: Cerambycidae
- Genus: Tyloxoles
- Species: T. javanicus

Binomial name
- Tyloxoles javanicus Breuning, 1960

Species of beetle

Tyloxoles javanicus is a species of beetle in the family Cerambycidae. It was described by Breuning in 1960. It is known from Java.
