= Tyloxoles boholicus =

Scientific classification
- Kingdom: Animalia
- Phylum: Arthropoda
- Class: Insecta
- Order: Coleoptera
- Suborder: Polyphaga
- Infraorder: Cucujiformia
- Family: Cerambycidae
- Genus: Tyloxoles
- Species: T. boholicus

Binomial name
- Tyloxoles boholicus Kriesche, 1927

Species of beetle

Tyloxoles boholicus is a species of beetle in the family Cerambycidae. It was described by Kriesche in 1927. It is known from the Philippines.
