= Ropicomimus vitticollis =

Scientific classification
- Kingdom: Animalia
- Phylum: Arthropoda
- Class: Insecta
- Order: Coleoptera
- Suborder: Polyphaga
- Infraorder: Cucujiformia
- Family: Cerambycidae
- Genus: Ropicomimus
- Species: R. vitticollis

Binomial name
- Ropicomimus vitticollis Breuning, 1953

Synonyms
- Ropicomimus kaszabi Breuning, 1975

Species of beetle

Ropicomimus vitticollis is a species of beetle in the family Cerambycidae. It was described by Breuning in 1953. It is known from Papua New Guinea.
