= Ropicomimus papuanus =

Scientific classification
- Kingdom: Animalia
- Phylum: Arthropoda
- Class: Insecta
- Order: Coleoptera
- Suborder: Polyphaga
- Infraorder: Cucujiformia
- Family: Cerambycidae
- Genus: Ropicomimus
- Species: R. papuanus

Binomial name
- Ropicomimus papuanus Breuning, 1940

Species of beetle

Ropicomimus papuanus is a species of beetle in the family Cerambycidae. It was described by Breuning in 1940. It is known from Papua New Guinea.
