= Ropicomimus =

Scientific classification
- Domain: Eukaryota
- Kingdom: Animalia
- Phylum: Arthropoda
- Class: Insecta
- Order: Coleoptera
- Suborder: Polyphaga
- Infraorder: Cucujiformia
- Family: Cerambycidae
- Genus: Ropicomimus

Genus of beetles

Ropicomimus is a genus of beetles in the family Cerambycidae, containing the following species:

- Ropicomimus papuanus Breuning, 1940
- Ropicomimus ruber Breuning, 1939
- Ropicomimus vitticollis Breuning, 1953
