= Apomecynoides linavourii =

Scientific classification
- Domain: Eukaryota
- Kingdom: Animalia
- Phylum: Arthropoda
- Class: Insecta
- Order: Coleoptera
- Suborder: Polyphaga
- Infraorder: Cucujiformia
- Family: Cerambycidae
- Genus: Apomecynoides
- Species: A. linavourii

Binomial name
- Apomecynoides linavourii Téocchi, 2011

Species of beetle

Apomecynoides linavourii is a species of beetle in the family Cerambycidae. It was described by Téocchi in 2011.
