= Apomecynoides tchadensis =

Scientific classification
- Kingdom: Animalia
- Phylum: Arthropoda
- Class: Insecta
- Order: Coleoptera
- Suborder: Polyphaga
- Infraorder: Cucujiformia
- Family: Cerambycidae
- Genus: Apomecynoides
- Species: A. tchadensis

Binomial name
- Apomecynoides tchadensis Breuning, 1977

Species of beetle

Apomecynoides tchadensis is a species of beetle in the family Cerambycidae. It was described by Breuning in 1977.
