= Apomecynoides =

Scientific classification
- Kingdom: Animalia
- Phylum: Arthropoda
- Class: Insecta
- Order: Coleoptera
- Suborder: Polyphaga
- Infraorder: Cucujiformia
- Family: Cerambycidae
- Subfamily: Lamiinae
- Tribe: Apomecynini
- Genus: Apomecynoides; Breuning, 1950

Genus of beetles

Apomecynoides is a genus of beetles in the family Cerambycidae, containing the following species:

- Apomecynoides linavourii Téocchi, 2011
- Apomecynoides senegalensis Breuning, 1950
- Apomecynoides tchadensis Breuning, 1977
