= Paraesylacris candida =

Scientific classification
- Kingdom: Animalia
- Phylum: Arthropoda
- Clade: Pancrustacea
- Class: Insecta
- Order: Coleoptera
- Suborder: Polyphaga
- Infraorder: Cucujiformia
- Family: Cerambycidae
- Genus: Paraesylacris
- Species: P. candida

Binomial name
- Paraesylacris candida Martins & Galileo, 2001

Species of beetle

Paraesylacris candida is a species of beetle in the family Cerambycidae. It was described by Martins and Galileo in 2001. It is found in Brazil.
