= Paraesylacris bituberosa =

Scientific classification
- Kingdom: Animalia
- Phylum: Arthropoda
- Class: Insecta
- Order: Coleoptera
- Suborder: Polyphaga
- Infraorder: Cucujiformia
- Family: Cerambycidae
- Genus: Paraesylacris
- Species: P. bituberosa

Binomial name
- Paraesylacris bituberosa Breuning, 1940

Species of beetle

Paraesylacris bituberosa (Etymology: Latin: with two tubers), is a species of beetle in the family Cerambycidae. It was described by Breuning in 1940.
