= Paraesylacris =

Scientific classification
- Kingdom: Animalia
- Phylum: Arthropoda
- Class: Insecta
- Order: Coleoptera
- Suborder: Polyphaga
- Infraorder: Cucujiformia
- Family: Cerambycidae
- Tribe: Apomecynini
- Genus: Paraesylacris

Genus of beetles

Paraesylacris is a genus of beetles in the family Cerambycidae, containing the following species:

- Paraesylacris bituberosa Breuning, 1940
- Paraesylacris candida Martins & Galileo, 2001
- Paraesylacris columbiana Breuning, 1940
