= Sybrohyagnis minor =

Scientific classification
- Kingdom: Animalia
- Phylum: Arthropoda
- Class: Insecta
- Order: Coleoptera
- Suborder: Polyphaga
- Infraorder: Cucujiformia
- Family: Cerambycidae
- Genus: Sybrohyagnis
- Species: S. minor

Binomial name
- Sybrohyagnis minor Breuning, 1964

Species of beetle

Sybrohyagnis minor is a species of beetle in the family Cerambycidae. It was described by Breuning in 1964.
