= Sybrohyagnis fuscomaculata =

Scientific classification
- Kingdom: Animalia
- Phylum: Arthropoda
- Class: Insecta
- Order: Coleoptera
- Suborder: Polyphaga
- Infraorder: Cucujiformia
- Family: Cerambycidae
- Genus: Sybrohyagnis
- Species: S. fuscomaculata

Binomial name
- Sybrohyagnis fuscomaculata Breuning, 1960

Species of beetle

Sybrohyagnis fuscomaculata is a species of beetle in the family Cerambycidae. It was described by Breuning in 1960.
