= Sybrohyagnis =

Scientific classification
- Kingdom: Animalia
- Phylum: Arthropoda
- Class: Insecta
- Order: Coleoptera
- Suborder: Polyphaga
- Infraorder: Cucujiformia
- Family: Cerambycidae
- Tribe: Apomecynini
- Genus: Sybrohyagnis

Genus of beetles

Sybrohyagnis is a genus of beetles in the family Cerambycidae, containing the following species:

- Sybrohyagnis congoensis Breuning, 1964
- Sybrohyagnis fuscomaculata Breuning, 1960
- Sybrohyagnis minor Breuning, 1964
