= Atrichocera moultoni =

Scientific classification
- Domain: Eukaryota
- Kingdom: Animalia
- Phylum: Arthropoda
- Class: Insecta
- Order: Coleoptera
- Suborder: Polyphaga
- Infraorder: Cucujiformia
- Family: Cerambycidae
- Genus: Atrichocera
- Species: A. moultoni

Binomial name
- Atrichocera moultoni (Aurivillius, 1911)

Species of beetle

Atrichocera moultoni is a genus of beetles in the family Cerambycidae. It is found in Malaysia.
