= Atrichocera celebensis =

Scientific classification
- Domain: Eukaryota
- Kingdom: Animalia
- Phylum: Arthropoda
- Class: Insecta
- Order: Coleoptera
- Suborder: Polyphaga
- Infraorder: Cucujiformia
- Family: Cerambycidae
- Genus: Atrichocera
- Species: A. celebensis

Binomial name
- Atrichocera celebensis (Bruening, 1943)

Species of beetle

Atrichocera celebensis is a genus of beetles in the family Cerambycidae.
