= Atrichocera =

Scientific classification
- Domain: Eukaryota
- Kingdom: Animalia
- Phylum: Arthropoda
- Class: Insecta
- Order: Coleoptera
- Suborder: Polyphaga
- Infraorder: Cucujiformia
- Family: Cerambycidae
- Subfamily: Lamiinae
- Tribe: Apomecynini
- Genus: Atrichocera; Aurivillius, 1911

Genus of beetles

Atrichocera is a genus of beetles in the family Cerambycidae, containing the following species:

- Atrichocera celebensis Breuning, 1943
- Atrichocera laosensis Breuning, 1963
- Atrichocera moultoni Aurivillius, 1911
