= Atrichocera laosensis =

Scientific classification
- Domain: Eukaryota
- Kingdom: Animalia
- Phylum: Arthropoda
- Class: Insecta
- Order: Coleoptera
- Suborder: Polyphaga
- Infraorder: Cucujiformia
- Family: Cerambycidae
- Genus: Atrichocera
- Species: A. laosensis

Binomial name
- Atrichocera laosensis (Bruening, 1963)

Species of beetle

Atrichocera laosensis is a genus of beetles in the family Cerambycidae.
