= Parahathlia melanocephala =

Scientific classification
- Kingdom: Animalia
- Phylum: Arthropoda
- Class: Insecta
- Order: Coleoptera
- Suborder: Polyphaga
- Infraorder: Cucujiformia
- Family: Cerambycidae
- Genus: Parahathlia
- Species: P. melanocephala

Binomial name
- Parahathlia melanocephala (Hope, 1841)

Species of beetle

Parahathlia melanocephala is a species of beetle in the family Cerambycidae. It was described by Hope in 1841.
