= Parahathlia =

Scientific classification
- Kingdom: Animalia
- Phylum: Arthropoda
- Class: Insecta
- Order: Coleoptera
- Suborder: Polyphaga
- Infraorder: Cucujiformia
- Family: Cerambycidae
- Tribe: Apomecynini
- Genus: Parahathlia

Genus of beetles

Parahathlia is a genus of beetles in the family Cerambycidae. This insect is found in Australia.

== Species ==
It containing the following species:

subgenus Linohathlia

- Parahathlia lineella (Hope, 1842)

subgenus Parahathlia

- Parahathlia melanocephala (Hope, 1841)
- Parahathlia rotundipennis Breuning, 1961
