= Epilystoides integripennis =

Scientific classification
- Kingdom: Animalia
- Phylum: Arthropoda
- Class: Insecta
- Order: Coleoptera
- Suborder: Polyphaga
- Infraorder: Cucujiformia
- Family: Cerambycidae
- Genus: Epilystoides
- Species: E. integripennis

Binomial name
- Epilystoides integripennis Breuning, 1942

Species of beetle

Epilystoides integripennis is a species of beetle in the family Cerambycidae. It was described by Breuning in 1942.
