= Epilystoides =

Scientific classification
- Kingdom: Animalia
- Phylum: Arthropoda
- Class: Insecta
- Order: Coleoptera
- Suborder: Polyphaga
- Infraorder: Cucujiformia
- Family: Cerambycidae
- Tribe: Apomecynini
- Genus: Epilystoides; Breuning, 1939

Type species
- Epilystoides bispinosus Breuning, 1939

Genus of beetles

Epilystoides is a genus of beetles in the family Cerambycidae, containing the following species:

- Epilystoides bispinosus Breuning, 1939
- Epilystoides integripennis Breuning, 1942
- Epilystoides unicolor Breuning, 1957
