= Sybroopsis =

Scientific classification
- Kingdom: Animalia
- Phylum: Arthropoda
- Class: Insecta
- Order: Coleoptera
- Suborder: Polyphaga
- Infraorder: Cucujiformia
- Family: Cerambycidae
- Tribe: Apomecynini
- Genus: Sybroopsis

Genus of beetles

Sybroopsis is a genus of beetles in the family Cerambycidae, containing the following species:

- Sybroopsis discedens (Fairmaire, 1881)
- Sybroopsis subtruncata Breuning, 1949
