= Sybroopsis discedens =

Scientific classification
- Kingdom: Animalia
- Phylum: Arthropoda
- Class: Insecta
- Order: Coleoptera
- Suborder: Polyphaga
- Infraorder: Cucujiformia
- Family: Cerambycidae
- Genus: Sybroopsis
- Species: S. discedens

Binomial name
- Sybroopsis discedens (Fairmaire, 1881)

Synonyms
- Oopsis discedens Fairmaire, 1881; Similosybra discedens (Fairmaire) Dillon & Dillon, 1952; Sybra persimilis Breuning, 1939

Species of beetle

Sybroopsis discedens is a species of beetle in the family Cerambycidae. It was described by Fairmaire in 1881.
