= Mimatimura subferruginea =

Scientific classification
- Domain: Eukaryota
- Kingdom: Animalia
- Phylum: Arthropoda
- Class: Insecta
- Order: Coleoptera
- Suborder: Polyphaga
- Infraorder: Cucujiformia
- Family: Cerambycidae
- Genus: Mimatimura
- Species: M. subferruginea

Binomial name
- Mimatimura subferruginea (Gressitt, 1951)

Species of beetle

Mimatimura subferruginea is a species of beetle in the family Cerambycidae. It was described by Gressitt in 1951.
