= Mimatimura =

Scientific classification
- Domain: Eukaryota
- Kingdom: Animalia
- Phylum: Arthropoda
- Class: Insecta
- Order: Coleoptera
- Suborder: Polyphaga
- Infraorder: Cucujiformia
- Family: Cerambycidae
- Tribe: Apomecynini
- Genus: Mimatimura; Breuning, 1939

Type species
- Mimatimura rufescens Breuning, 1939

Genus of beetles

Mimatimura is a genus of beetles in the family Cerambycidae, containing the following species:

- Mimatimura rufescens Breuning, 1939
- Mimatimura subferruginea (Gressitt, 1951)
