= Palpicrassus paulistanus =

Scientific classification
- Kingdom: Animalia
- Phylum: Arthropoda
- Class: Insecta
- Order: Coleoptera
- Suborder: Polyphaga
- Infraorder: Cucujiformia
- Family: Cerambycidae
- Genus: Palpicrassus
- Species: P. paulistanus

Binomial name
- Palpicrassus paulistanus Galileo & Martins, 2007

Species of beetle

Palpicrassus paulistanus is a species of beetle in the family Cerambycidae. It was described by Galileo and Martins in 2007.
