= Palpicrassus inexpectatus =

Scientific classification
- Kingdom: Animalia
- Phylum: Arthropoda
- Class: Insecta
- Order: Coleoptera
- Suborder: Polyphaga
- Infraorder: Cucujiformia
- Family: Cerambycidae
- Genus: Palpicrassus
- Species: P. inexpectatus

Binomial name
- Palpicrassus inexpectatus Martins & Galileo, 2010

Species of beetle

Palpicrassus inexpectatus is a species of beetle in the family Cerambycidae. It was described by Martins and Galileo in 2010.
