= Palpicrassus =

Scientific classification
- Kingdom: Animalia
- Phylum: Arthropoda
- Class: Insecta
- Order: Coleoptera
- Suborder: Polyphaga
- Infraorder: Cucujiformia
- Family: Cerambycidae
- Tribe: Apomecynini
- Genus: Palpicrassus

Genus of beetles

Palpicrassus is a genus of beetles in the family Cerambycidae, containing the following species:

- Palpicrassus inexpectatus Martins & Galileo, 2010
- Palpicrassus paulistanus Galileo & Martins, 2007
