= Prosenella unicolor =

Scientific classification
- Domain: Eukaryota
- Kingdom: Animalia
- Phylum: Arthropoda
- Class: Insecta
- Order: Coleoptera
- Suborder: Polyphaga
- Infraorder: Cucujiformia
- Family: Cerambycidae
- Genus: Prosenella
- Species: P. unicolor

Binomial name
- Prosenella unicolor Martins & Galileo, 2003

Species of beetle

Prosenella unicolor is a species of beetle in the family Cerambycidae. It was described by Martins and Galileo in 2003. It is known from Brazil.
