= Prosenella =

Scientific classification
- Domain: Eukaryota
- Kingdom: Animalia
- Phylum: Arthropoda
- Class: Insecta
- Order: Coleoptera
- Suborder: Polyphaga
- Infraorder: Cucujiformia
- Family: Cerambycidae
- Tribe: Apomecynini
- Genus: Prosenella

Genus of beetles

Prosenella is a genus of beetles in the family Cerambycidae, containing the following species:

- Prosenella muehni (Bruch, 1933)
- Prosenella unicolor Martins & Galileo, 2003
