= Prosenella muehni =

Scientific classification
- Domain: Eukaryota
- Kingdom: Animalia
- Phylum: Arthropoda
- Class: Insecta
- Order: Coleoptera
- Suborder: Polyphaga
- Infraorder: Cucujiformia
- Family: Cerambycidae
- Genus: Prosenella
- Species: P. muehni

Binomial name
- Prosenella muehni (Bruch, 1933)

Species of beetle

Prosenella muehni is a species of beetle in the family Cerambycidae. It was described by Bruch in 1933. It is known from Argentina.
