= Oopsidius =

Scientific classification
- Kingdom: Animalia
- Phylum: Arthropoda
- Class: Insecta
- Order: Coleoptera
- Suborder: Polyphaga
- Infraorder: Cucujiformia
- Family: Cerambycidae
- Tribe: Apomecynini
- Genus: Oopsidius; Breuning, 1939

Type species
- Oopsidius pictus Breuning, 1939

Genus of beetles

Oopsidius is a genus of beetles in the family Cerambycidae, containing the following species:

- Oopsidius cetus Dillon & Dillon, 1952
- Oopsidius pictus Breuning, 1939
