= Pseudorucentra =

Scientific classification
- Kingdom: Animalia
- Phylum: Arthropoda
- Class: Insecta
- Order: Coleoptera
- Suborder: Polyphaga
- Infraorder: Cucujiformia
- Family: Cerambycidae
- Tribe: Apomecynini
- Genus: Pseudorucentra

Genus of beetles

Pseudorucentra is a genus of beetles in the family Cerambycidae, containing the following species:

- Pseudorucentra elongata Breuning, 1948
- Pseudorucentra sybroides Breuning, 1948
