= Pseudorucentra elongata =

Scientific classification
- Kingdom: Animalia
- Phylum: Arthropoda
- Class: Insecta
- Order: Coleoptera
- Suborder: Polyphaga
- Infraorder: Cucujiformia
- Family: Cerambycidae
- Genus: Pseudorucentra
- Species: P. elongata

Binomial name
- Pseudorucentra elongata Breuning, 1948

Species of beetle

Pseudorucentra elongata is a species of beetle in the family Cerambycidae. It was described by Breuning in 1948.
