= Hippaphesis granicornis =

Scientific classification
- Kingdom: Animalia
- Phylum: Arthropoda
- Class: Insecta
- Order: Coleoptera
- Suborder: Polyphaga
- Infraorder: Cucujiformia
- Family: Cerambycidae
- Genus: Hippaphesis
- Species: H. granicornis

Binomial name
- Hippaphesis granicornis (Fairmaire, 1879)

Species of beetle

Hippaphesis granicornis is a species of beetle in the family Cerambycidae. It was described by Fairmaire in 1879.
