= Hippaphesis =

Scientific classification
- Kingdom: Animalia
- Phylum: Arthropoda
- Class: Insecta
- Order: Coleoptera
- Suborder: Polyphaga
- Infraorder: Cucujiformia
- Family: Cerambycidae
- Tribe: Apomecynini
- Genus: Hippaphesis

Genus of beetles

Hippaphesis is a genus of beetles in the family Cerambycidae, containing the following species:

- Hippaphesis granicornis (Fairmaire, 1879)
- Hippaphesis punctata Thomson, 1864
