= Schoutedenius =

Scientific classification
- Kingdom: Animalia
- Phylum: Arthropoda
- Class: Insecta
- Order: Coleoptera
- Suborder: Polyphaga
- Infraorder: Cucujiformia
- Family: Cerambycidae
- Tribe: Apomecynini
- Genus: Schoutedenius

Genus of beetles

Schoutedenius is a genus of beetles in the family Cerambycidae, containing the following species:

- Schoutedenius albogriseus Breuning, 1954
- Schoutedenius gardneri Breuning, 1960
