= Metepilysta =

Scientific classification
- Kingdom: Animalia
- Phylum: Arthropoda
- Class: Insecta
- Order: Coleoptera
- Suborder: Polyphaga
- Infraorder: Cucujiformia
- Family: Cerambycidae
- Tribe: Apomecynini
- Genus: Metepilysta

Genus of beetles

Metepilysta is a genus of beetles in the family Cerambycidae, containing the following species:

- Metepilysta enganensis Breuning, 1970
- Metepilysta negrosensis Breuning, 1970
