= Metepilysta negrosensis =

Scientific classification
- Kingdom: Animalia
- Phylum: Arthropoda
- Class: Insecta
- Order: Coleoptera
- Suborder: Polyphaga
- Infraorder: Cucujiformia
- Family: Cerambycidae
- Genus: Metepilysta
- Species: M. negrosensis

Binomial name
- Metepilysta negrosensis Breuning, 1970

Species of beetle

Metepilysta negrosensis is a species of beetle in the family Cerambycidae. It was described by Breuning in 1970.
