= Euryplocia striatipennis =

Scientific classification
- Kingdom: Animalia
- Phylum: Arthropoda
- Class: Insecta
- Order: Coleoptera
- Suborder: Polyphaga
- Infraorder: Cucujiformia
- Family: Cerambycidae
- Genus: Euryplocia
- Species: E. striatipennis

Binomial name
- Euryplocia striatipennis Breuning, 1939

Species of beetle

Euryplocia striatipennis is a genus of beetles in the family Cerambycidae.
