= Euryplocia =

Scientific classification
- Kingdom: Animalia
- Phylum: Arthropoda
- Class: Insecta
- Order: Coleoptera
- Suborder: Polyphaga
- Infraorder: Cucujiformia
- Family: Cerambycidae
- Tribe: Apomecynini
- Genus: Euryplocia; Breuning, 1939

Genus of beetles

Euryplocia is a genus of beetles in the family Cerambycidae, containing the following species:

- Euryplocia salomonum Breuning, 1956
- Euryplocia striatipennis Breuning, 1939
