= Euryplocia salomonum =

Scientific classification
- Kingdom: Animalia
- Phylum: Arthropoda
- Clade: Pancrustacea
- Class: Insecta
- Order: Coleoptera
- Suborder: Polyphaga
- Infraorder: Cucujiformia
- Family: Cerambycidae
- Genus: Euryplocia
- Species: E. salomonum

Binomial name
- Euryplocia salomonum Breuning, 1956

Genus of beetle

Euryplocia salomonum is a genus of beetles in the family Cerambycidae.
