= Paradoliops =

Scientific classification
- Kingdom: Animalia
- Phylum: Arthropoda
- Class: Insecta
- Order: Coleoptera
- Suborder: Polyphaga
- Infraorder: Cucujiformia
- Family: Cerambycidae
- Tribe: Apomecynini
- Genus: Paradoliops

Genus of beetles

Paradoliops is a genus of beetles in the family Cerambycidae, containing the following species:

- Paradoliops cabigasi Vives, 2009
- Paradoliops humerosa (Heller, 1921)
