= Paradoliops cabigasi =

Scientific classification
- Kingdom: Animalia
- Phylum: Arthropoda
- Class: Insecta
- Order: Coleoptera
- Suborder: Polyphaga
- Infraorder: Cucujiformia
- Family: Cerambycidae
- Genus: Paradoliops
- Species: P. cabigasi

Binomial name
- Paradoliops cabigasi Vives, 2009

Species of beetle

Paradoliops cabigasi is a species of beetle in the family Cerambycidae. It was described by Vives in 2009.
