= Paradoliops humerosa =

Scientific classification
- Kingdom: Animalia
- Phylum: Arthropoda
- Class: Insecta
- Order: Coleoptera
- Suborder: Polyphaga
- Infraorder: Cucujiformia
- Family: Cerambycidae
- Genus: Paradoliops
- Species: P. humerosa

Binomial name
- Paradoliops humerosa (Heller, 1921)

Species of beetle

Paradoliops humerosa is a species of beetle in the family Cerambycidae. It was described by Heller in 1921.
