= Paranicomia =

Scientific classification
- Kingdom: Animalia
- Phylum: Arthropoda
- Class: Insecta
- Order: Coleoptera
- Suborder: Polyphaga
- Infraorder: Cucujiformia
- Family: Cerambycidae
- Tribe: Apomecynini
- Genus: Paranicomia

Genus of beetles

Paranicomia is a genus of beetles in the family Cerambycidae, containing the following species:

- Paranicomia leucoma (Lacordaire, 1872)
- Paranicomia similis Breuning, 1964
