= Paranicomia leucoma =

Scientific classification
- Kingdom: Animalia
- Phylum: Arthropoda
- Class: Insecta
- Order: Coleoptera
- Suborder: Polyphaga
- Infraorder: Cucujiformia
- Family: Cerambycidae
- Genus: Paranicomia
- Species: P. leucoma

Binomial name
- Paranicomia leucoma (Lacordaire, 1872)

Species of beetle

Paranicomia leucoma is a species of beetle in the family Cerambycidae. It was described by Lacordaire in 1872.
