= Epilysta flavescens =

Scientific classification
- Kingdom: Animalia
- Phylum: Arthropoda
- Class: Insecta
- Order: Coleoptera
- Suborder: Polyphaga
- Infraorder: Cucujiformia
- Family: Cerambycidae
- Genus: Epilysta
- Species: E. flavescens

Binomial name
- Epilysta flavescens Breuning & de Jong, 1941

Synonyms
- Epilysta flavescena Breuning, 1960

Species of beetle

Epilysta flavescens is a species of beetle in the family Cerambycidae.
