= Epilysta mucida =

Scientific classification
- Kingdom: Animalia
- Phylum: Arthropoda
- Class: Insecta
- Order: Coleoptera
- Suborder: Polyphaga
- Infraorder: Cucujiformia
- Family: Cerambycidae
- Genus: Epilysta
- Species: E. mucida

Binomial name
- Epilysta mucida Pascoe, 1865

Species of beetle

Epilysta mucida is a species of beetle in the family Cerambycidae.
