= Epilysta =

Scientific classification
- Kingdom: Animalia
- Phylum: Arthropoda
- Class: Insecta
- Order: Coleoptera
- Suborder: Polyphaga
- Infraorder: Cucujiformia
- Family: Cerambycidae
- Tribe: Apomecynini
- Genus: Epilysta

Genus of beetles

Epilysta is a genus of beetles in the family Cerambycidae, containing the following species:

- Epilysta flavescens Breuning & de Jong, 1941
- Epilysta mucida Pascoe, 1865
