= Baudona =

Scientific classification
- Kingdom: Animalia
- Phylum: Arthropoda
- Class: Insecta
- Order: Coleoptera
- Suborder: Polyphaga
- Infraorder: Cucujiformia
- Family: Cerambycidae
- Tribe: Apomecynini
- Genus: Baudona

Genus of beetles

Baudona is a genus of beetles in the family Cerambycidae, containing the following species:

- Baudona borneotica Breuning, 1969
- Baudona ochreovittata Breuning, 1963
