= Cornallis gracilipes =

Scientific classification
- Kingdom: Animalia
- Phylum: Arthropoda
- Class: Insecta
- Order: Coleoptera
- Suborder: Polyphaga
- Infraorder: Cucujiformia
- Family: Cerambycidae
- Genus: Cornallis
- Species: C. gracilipes

Binomial name
- Cornallis gracilipes Thomson, 1864

Species of beetle

Cornallis gracilipes is a species of beetle in the family Cerambycidae. It was described by Thomson in 1864.
