= Theresina grossepunctata =

Scientific classification
- Kingdom: Animalia
- Phylum: Arthropoda
- Class: Insecta
- Order: Coleoptera
- Suborder: Polyphaga
- Infraorder: Cucujiformia
- Family: Cerambycidae
- Genus: Theresina
- Species: T. grossepunctata

Binomial name
- Theresina grossepunctata Breuning, 1963

Species of beetle

Theresina grossepunctata is a species of beetle in the family Cerambycidae. It was described by Breuning in 1963.
