= Theresina punctata =

Scientific classification
- Kingdom: Animalia
- Phylum: Arthropoda
- Class: Insecta
- Order: Coleoptera
- Suborder: Polyphaga
- Infraorder: Cucujiformia
- Family: Cerambycidae
- Genus: Theresina
- Species: T. punctata

Binomial name
- Theresina punctata (Pic, 1927)

Species of beetle

Theresina punctata is a species of beetle in the family Cerambycidae. It was described by Pic in 1927.
