= Theresina =

Scientific classification
- Kingdom: Animalia
- Phylum: Arthropoda
- Class: Insecta
- Order: Coleoptera
- Suborder: Polyphaga
- Infraorder: Cucujiformia
- Family: Cerambycidae
- Tribe: Apomecynini
- Genus: Theresina

Genus of beetles

Theresina is a genus of beetles in the family Cerambycidae. It contains the following species:

- Theresina grossepunctata Breuning, 1963
- Theresina punctata (Pic, 1927)
