= Meximia =

Scientific classification
- Kingdom: Animalia
- Phylum: Arthropoda
- Class: Insecta
- Order: Coleoptera
- Suborder: Polyphaga
- Infraorder: Cucujiformia
- Family: Cerambycidae
- Tribe: Apomecynini
- Genus: Meximia

Genus of beetles

Meximia is a genus of beetles in the family Cerambycidae, containing the following species:

- Meximia decolorata Pascoe, 1865
- Meximia perfusa Pascoe, 1865
