= Meximia perfusa =

Scientific classification
- Kingdom: Animalia
- Phylum: Arthropoda
- Class: Insecta
- Order: Coleoptera
- Suborder: Polyphaga
- Infraorder: Cucujiformia
- Family: Cerambycidae
- Genus: Meximia
- Species: M. perfusa

Binomial name
- Meximia perfusa Pascoe, 1865

Species of beetle

Meximia perfusa is a species of beetle in the family Cerambycidae. It was described by Pascoe in 1865.
