= Hispomorpha horrida =

Scientific classification
- Kingdom: Animalia
- Phylum: Arthropoda
- Clade: Pancrustacea
- Class: Insecta
- Order: Coleoptera
- Suborder: Polyphaga
- Infraorder: Cucujiformia
- Family: Cerambycidae
- Genus: Hispomorpha
- Species: H. horrida

Binomial name
- Hispomorpha horrida Newman, 1842

Species of beetle

Hispomorpha horrida is a species of beetle in the family Cerambycidae. It was described by Newman in 1842.
