= Hispomorpha =

Scientific classification
- Kingdom: Animalia
- Phylum: Arthropoda
- Clade: Pancrustacea
- Class: Insecta
- Order: Coleoptera
- Suborder: Polyphaga
- Infraorder: Cucujiformia
- Family: Cerambycidae
- Subfamily: Lamiinae
- Tribe: Apomecynini
- Genus: Hispomorpha; Newman, 1842

Type species
- Hispomorpha horrida Newman, 1842

Genus of beetles

Hispomorpha is a genus of beetles in the family Cerambycidae.

Species:

- Hispomorpha horrida Newman, 1842
- Hispomorpha palawanicola Vives, 2024
