= Procaris noelensis =

Scientific classification
- Kingdom: Animalia
- Phylum: Arthropoda
- Class: Malacostraca
- Order: Decapoda
- Suborder: Pleocyemata
- Family: Procarididae
- Genus: Procaris
- Species: P. noelensis

Binomial name
- Procaris noelensis Bruce & Davie, 2006

Species of crustacean

Procaris noelensis is a species of shrimp. A single specimen from a freshwater/tidally influenced cave system on Christmas Island was described by Bruce & Davie in 2006. The species is widely separated geographically from other members of its genus and may be a relict species from the Mesozoic fauna of the Tethys Ocean, with Christmas Island being its refugium. This theory is reinforced by the fact that it was found living in sympatry with a hippolytid shrimp and an atyid shrimp, the latter coming from another ancient lineage and often found inhabiting anchialine systems.

== Distribution ==
Procaris is a small genus of aberrant shrimps with only five known members. Previously, three of these—Procaris ascensionis, Procaris chacei and Procaris mexicana—were known only from their type locations in the Atlantic Ocean. Another, Procaris hawaiana, was known only from Hawaii in the Pacific Ocean. As a result, with Procaris noelensis's discovery on Christmas Island in 2006, it became the first member of the genus identified from the Indian Ocean. This species is known from a single female individual, the holotype, found in an anchialine cave where saltwater intrudes into the karst limestone.
