= Calliasmata pholidota =

Conservation status
- Imperiled (NatureServe)

Scientific classification
- Kingdom: Animalia
- Phylum: Arthropoda
- Clade: Pancrustacea
- Class: Malacostraca
- Order: Decapoda
- Suborder: Pleocyemata
- Infraorder: Caridea
- Family: Barbouriidae
- Genus: Calliasmata
- Species: C. pholidota

Binomial name
- Calliasmata pholidota Holthuis, 1973

Species of crustacean

Calliasmata pholidota is a species of shrimp in the family Barbouriidae. It is thought C. pholidota is an opportunistic feeder, taking live prey or scavenging for food.

== Description ==
Its size varies from 15 millimetres (0.59 in) to 30 millimetres (1.2 in) in total length. Its body color is pale pink to brilliant red (with red banding); its legs are red to pale. There is frequently a traverse red band along the base of the telson. This shrimp, along with other in this family can change the intensity of the red pigment, and as such they are called chameleon shrimp. Black pigments are associated with the eyes. Its chelipeds are conspicuous. This species achieves locomotion by walking over the substrate.

== Distribution ==
Within the Hawaiian Islands, Calliasamata pholidota is known to occur in mid-to high salinity anchialine pools. C. pholidota has a disjunct, Indo-Pacific distribution, being reported from the Red Sea-Sinai Peninsula, Funafuti Atoll, and the Hawaiian Islands of Maui and Hawaii. On the island of Hawaii, the species habitates one pool at Ka Lae at Lua o Palahemo and in one pool group in the Manuka Natural Area Reserve. On Maui, it is found in four pool groups in Ahihi-Kinau. At Lua o Palahemo, it co-occurs with three other candidate species of anchialine pool shrimp, Antecaridina lauensis, Procaris hawaiana, and Vetericaris chaceorum. In the aforementioned sightings, specimens were not abundant, and as such this species has been considered for endangered species status, as their numbers are assumed to be considerably small. Like other anchialine pool shrimp species, it is believed that this species inhabits an extensive network of water-filled interstitial spaces leading to and from the actual pool.
