= Parhippolyte uveae =

Scientific classification
- Kingdom: Animalia
- Phylum: Arthropoda
- Clade: Pancrustacea
- Class: Malacostraca
- Order: Decapoda
- Suborder: Pleocyemata
- Infraorder: Caridea
- Family: Barbouriidae
- Genus: Parhippolyte
- Species: P. uvae

Binomial name
- Parhippolyte uvae Borradaile, 1900

Species of crustacean

Parhippolyte uveae, the sugar cane shrimp, is a species of cave shrimp from the family Barbouriidae from the Indian and western Pacific Oceans. It was described by the English carcinologist Lancelot Alexander Borradaile from specimens collected by Arthur Willey in the south Pacific in 1895–1897 and is the type species of the genus Parhippolyte.

== Description ==
Parhippolyte uvae appears to have two colour forms, a red and white banded form is found in Hawaii while in other parts of the range this species is bright red. It has long slender legs and antennae.

== Distribution ==
Specimens of Parhippolyte uvae have been collected from Aldabra in the western Indian Ocean, Kakaban Island and Halmahera in Indonesia, Tiniguiban Islet in the Philippines, the Loyalty Islands, Fiji, Ellice Islands and Oahu in Hawaii. It has also been recorded in the Mascarene Islands of Réunion and Mauritius.

== Biology ==
Parhippolyte uvae occurs in anchialine pools and marine caves. In Hawaii it occurs in lava pipes and caves whereas on other islands it is found in more open areas.

P. uveae varies in its behaviour from location to location. For example, the population of P.uveae in the lagoon at Kakaban Island appears to be photophobic and was only recorded being active at night, while the population from Tinguiban Islet in the Philippines were described as being "sun-lovers". The adult P.uveae fed in depths of 1-2m in the lagoon and were not found in the adjacent open reef. The differences in colouration and behaviour may indicate that P. uveae is made up of more than one cryptic species. Where it occurs P.uveae is quite numerous and has been said to appear "in masses".

== Cultural references ==
On Vatulele Island in Fiji populations of bright red Parhippolyte uvae occur in a complex of anchialine grottoes and pools. Several legends have arisen to explain the origin of these populations and the Fijians call P. uveae ura damudamu which means "red prawn" or ura buta which means "cooked prawn". On Vatulele the islanders treat the prawns with great respect, and they have a traditional practice of “calling” the prawns using chants and clapping. It is taboo for the islanders to kill or harm the prawns in any way, although local guides have been allowed to enter the pools to show them to tourists for some years.

== Aquarium trade ==
Parhippolyte uvae is available in the aquarium trade and is said to be relatively easy to keep and breed. Some research is being carried out in establishing breeding facilities for P. uveae to provide animals for the trade. P. uveae has been featured on a Fijian postage stamp, the first anchialine species so honoured.
