= Hawaiana =

Hawaiana may refer to:

- Procaris hawaiana
- Falsoropica hawaiana
