= Chacei =

Chacei may refer to:

- Procaris chacei
- Crassispira chacei
- Eidocamptophallus chacei
