= C. turricula =

C. turricula may refer to:

- Carelia turricula, an extinct land snail species endemic to the Hawaiian Islands
- Crassispira turricula, a sea snail species

== See also ==
- Turricula (disambiguation)
