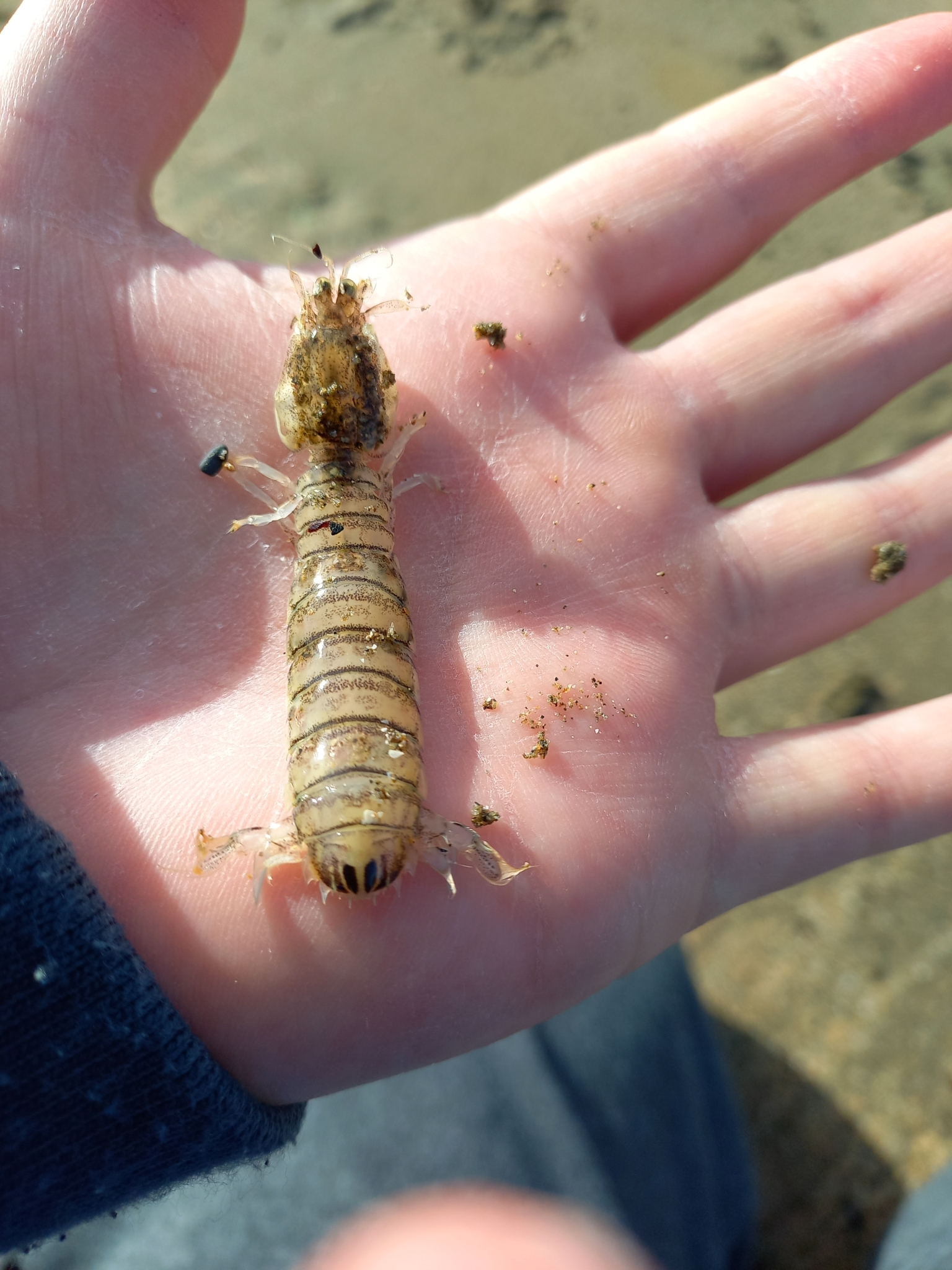

Conservation status
- Naturally Uncommon (NZ TCS)

Scientific classification
- Kingdom: Animalia
- Phylum: Arthropoda
- Clade: Pancrustacea
- Class: Malacostraca
- Order: Stomatopoda
- Family: Tetrasquillidae
- Genus: Heterosquilla
- Species: H. tricarinata

Binomial name
- Heterosquilla tricarinata (Claus, 1871)

Synonyms
- Coronis spinosa Wood-Mason, 1875 Coronis tricarinata Claus, 1871 Squilla indefensa 1878

= Heterosquilla tricarinata =

Species of crustacean

Heterosquilla tricarinata is a species of mantis shrimp in the family Tetrasquillidae. It is found in both the Indo-West Pacific, Andaman Islands and throughout New Zealand.

== Taxonomy ==
This species was first described by Carl Freiedrich Wilhelm Claus, a German zoologist and anatomist, and originally Coronis tricarinata in 1871.

== Description ==
Heterosquilla tricarinata live in tidal mud flats creating extensive barrow systems. This species of mantis shrimp is adapted for low dissolved oxygen levels in its benthic habitat. The shrimp ranges from a light beige to greenish colour with the females often having a distinctive red stripe along the spine.

== Distribution ==
Three species of Heterosquilla (H. laevis, H. koning, H. tricarinata) range throughout New Zealand, from Northland to the south, including H. tricarinata found on the Chatham Rise and the Auckland Islands.

== Ecology ==
H. tricarinata is an ambush predator with sharp pincers. Benthic foraging predators prey on H. tricarinata, including the rig or spotty dogfish shark (Mustelus lenticulatus).

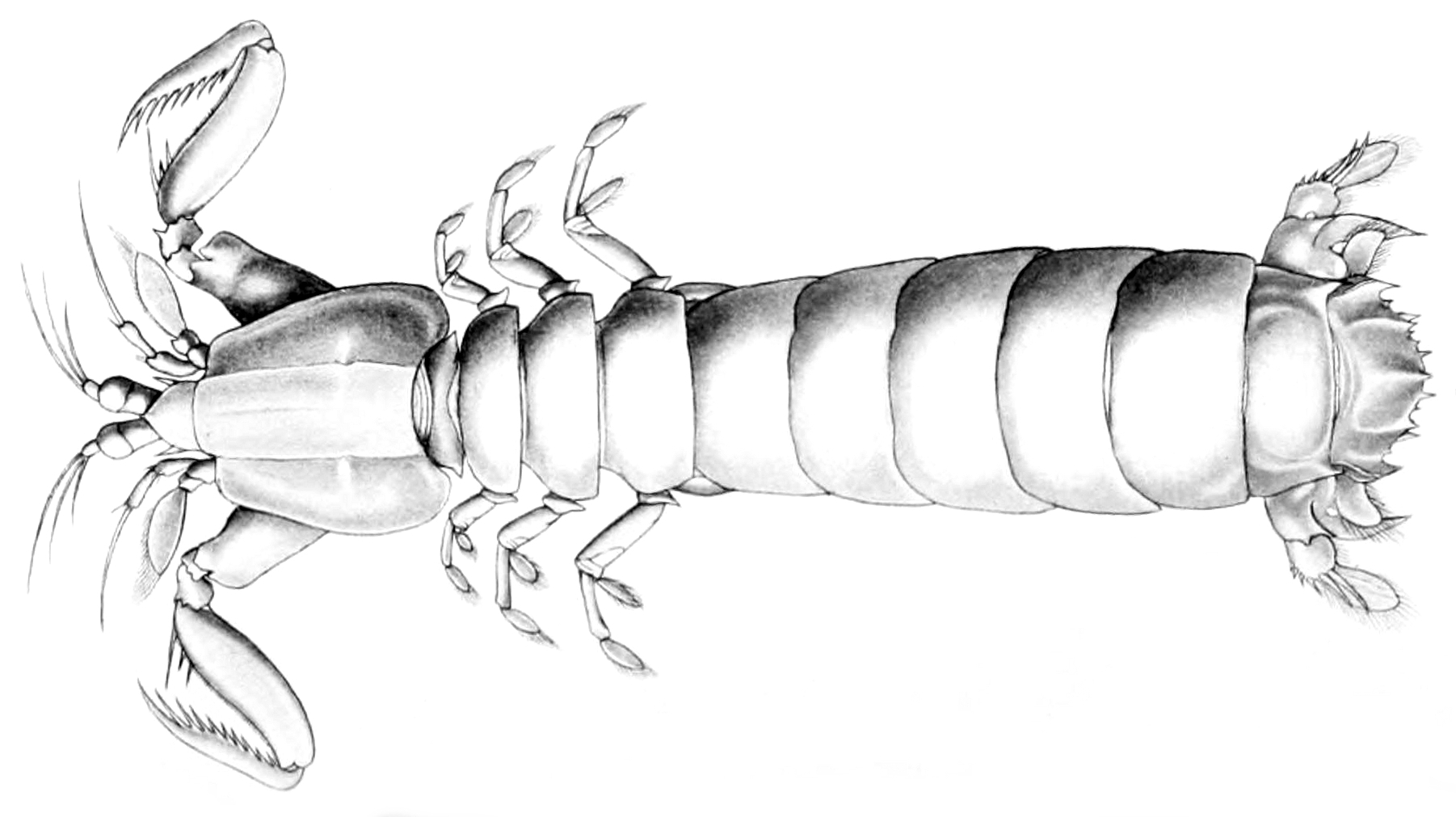
Squillidae James Wood-Mason 1895
