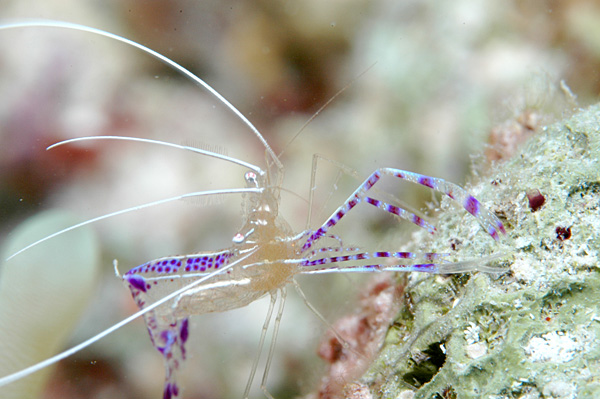

Scientific classification
- Kingdom: Animalia
- Phylum: Arthropoda
- Clade: Pancrustacea
- Class: Malacostraca
- Order: Decapoda
- Suborder: Pleocyemata
- Infraorder: Caridea
- Family: Palaemonidae
- Genus: Ancylomenes
- Species: A. pedersoni

Binomial name
- Ancylomenes pedersoni (Chace, 1958)

Synonyms
- Periclimenes anthophilus Holthuis & Eibl-Eibesfeldt, 1964; Periclimenes pedersoni Chace, 1958

= Ancylomenes pedersoni =

Species of crustacean

Ancylomenes pedersoni, sometimes known as Pederson's shrimp and Pederson's cleaner shrimp, is a species of cleaner shrimp. It is part of the genus Ancylomenes and was described in 1958 by Fenner A. Chace Jr. as Periclimenes pedersoni. Ancylomenes pedersoni is found in the Caribbean Sea, often associated with a sea anemone, at depths of 1 to 15 metres (3 to 49 ft). They are often found on the reefs off Bermuda.

== Description ==
Pederson's shrimp is a small transparent shrimp with bluish and violet markings on the body and long white antennae and within its range is unlikely to be confused with other species.

== Ecology ==
Pederson's shrimp lives in association with a sea anemone, either Bartholomea annulata or Condylactis gigantea, living among the tentacles with impunity. Before it can do this it needs to acclimatise itself to the anemone by progressively pressing its body and appendages against the tentacles for increasing periods of time. After this it is able to move between the tentacles without getting stung but if it is separated from its host for a few days, it will need to repeat the immunizing procedure. Up to 26 shrimps have been found associated with one sea anemone but usually there are just one or two. The shrimp offers cleaning services to passing fish and attracts their attention by lashing its antennae about. Fish visiting the cleaning station will remain stationary while their external parasites are removed and eaten by the shrimp, which even cleans inside the gill covers and the mouth. If a neon goby sets up a cleaning station nearby, the shrimp will clean the client fish at the same time as the goby does. Researchers have shown that fish recognise the sea anemone Bartholomea annulata as being a place at which the shrimps' services are likely to be available. The larger the sea anemone, the more likely fish are to visit it.
