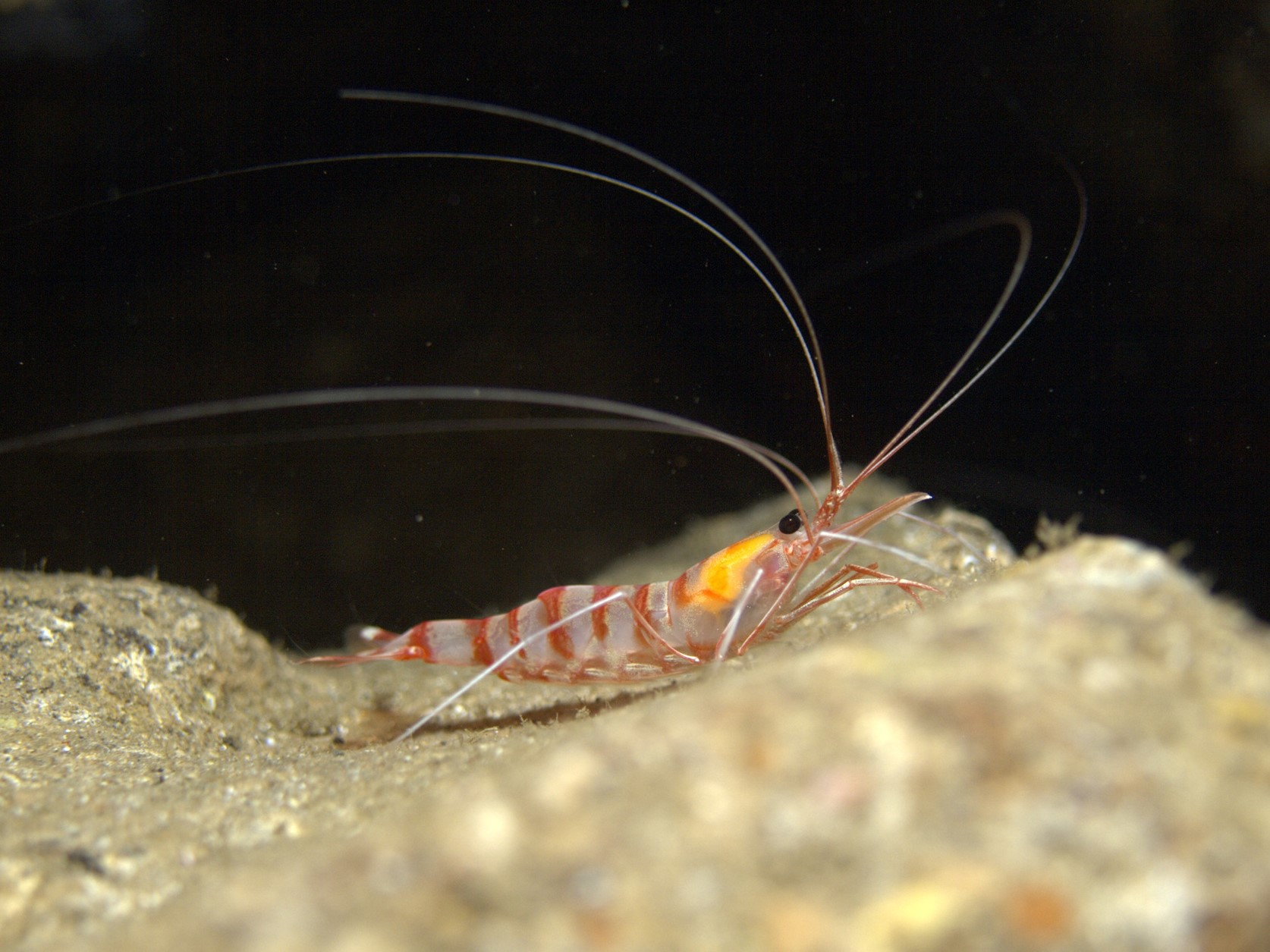
- Parhippolyte misticia

Scientific classification
- Domain: Eukaryota
- Kingdom: Animalia
- Phylum: Arthropoda
- Class: Malacostraca
- Order: Decapoda
- Suborder: Pleocyemata
- Infraorder: Caridea
- Family: Barbouriidae
- Genus: Parhippolyte; Borradaile, 1900

Type species
- Parhippolyte uveae Borradaile, 1900

Synonyms
- Somersiella C.W.J. Hart & Manning, 1981; Koror J. Clark, 1989

= Parhippolyte =

Genus of crustaceans

Parhippolyte is a genus of cave dwelling decapod crustaceans, known as cave shrimps from the family Barbouriidae The type species Parhippolyte uveae was described in 1900 by the English carcinologist Lancelot Alexander Borradaile from specimens collected in the south western Pacific by Arthur Willey. As their vernacular name of cave shrimp suggests these species are generally found in marine caves as well as anchialine ponds and lagoons.

== Species ==
There are currently 6 species recognised:

- Parhippolyte antiguensis (Chace, 1972) — Caribbean
- Parhippolyte cavernicola Wicksten, 1996 — Gulf of California
- Parhippolyte misticia (J. Clark, 1989) — Palau
- Parhippolyte rukuensis Burukovsky, 2007 — Ryukyu Islands
- Parhippolyte sterreri (C.W.J. Hart & Manning, 1981) — Caribbean and Bermuda
- Parhippolyte uveae Borradaile, 1900 — Indian and western Pacific Oceans
