= Fenner A. Chace Jr. =

American carcinologist

Fenner Albert Chace Jr. (October 5, 1908 – May 30, 2004) was an American carcinologist.

== Life ==
Fenner Albert Chace Jr. was born in Fall River, Massachusetts. He attended Harvard University, and received his doctorate in 1934, and became a curator at that university's Museum of Comparative Zoology. After the start of World War II, he worked as a civilian for the Army Air Force oceanographic group, and later commissioned as an officer. His unit was dismantled, and he was reassigned to the US Navy Hydrographic Office. He worked to produce cloth survival charts to be used by aviators lost at sea. After the war, he succeeded Waldo L. Schmitt at the United States National Museum. He worked at the National Museum until his retirement in 1978, and then he continued as Zoologist Emeritus. He was "one of the most influential carcinologists of the 20th century", and named 200 taxa in the Decapoda and Stomatopoda, most of them shrimp.

== Taxa ==
Taxa named by Fenner A. Chace include:

- Atyopsis Chace, 1983
- Eunephrops cadenasi Chace, 1939
- Palaemonetes cummingi Chace, 1954
- Physetocaris Chace, 1940
- Physetocaris microphthalma Chace, 1940
- Potamonautes choloensis (Chace, 1953)
- Potamonautes idjiwiensis (Chace, 1942)
- Potamonautes montivagus (Chace, 1953)
- Potamonautes mutandensis (Chace, 1942)
- Procarididae Chace & Manning, 1972
- Procaridoidea Chace & Manning, 1972
- Procaris Chace & Manning, 1972
- Procaris ascensionis Chace & Manning, 1972
- Psalidopus barbouri Chace, 1939
- Tetrasquilla Manning & Chace, 1990
- Typhlatya monae Chace, 1954
- Typhlatya rogersi Chace & Manning, 1972

Chace is commemorated in a number of names of taxa:

- Alpheus fenneri A. J. Bruce, 1994
- Archaeatya chacei Villalobos, 1960
- Atyoida chacei de Mazancourt, Marquet & Keith, 2024
- Chacella A. J. Bruce, 1986
- Chaceon fenneri (Manning & Holthuis, 1984)
- Chorocaris chacei (Williams & Rona, 1986)
- Crassispira chacei Hertlein & Strong, 1951
- Dicranodromia chacei Guinot, 1995
- Fennera chacei Holthuis, 1951
- Fenneralpheus chacei Felder & Manning, 1986
- Fenneropenaeus Perez Farfante, 1969
- Hymenopenaeus chacei Crosnier & Forest, 1969
- Ifanella chacei Vervoort, 1964
- Ischnochiton chaceorum P. Kaas & R. A. Van Belle, 1990
- Michelopagurus chacei McLaughlin, 1997
- Pasiphaea chacei Yaldwyn, 1962
- Plesionika chacei Crosnier, 1986
- Pylocheles chacei Forest, 1987
- Rimicaris chacei Williams & Rona, 1986
- Scyllarus chacei Holthuis, 1960
- Vetericaris chaceorum Kensley & Williams, 1986

The shrimp genus Janicea (currently in the family Barbouriidae) is named after Chace's wife, Janice.
