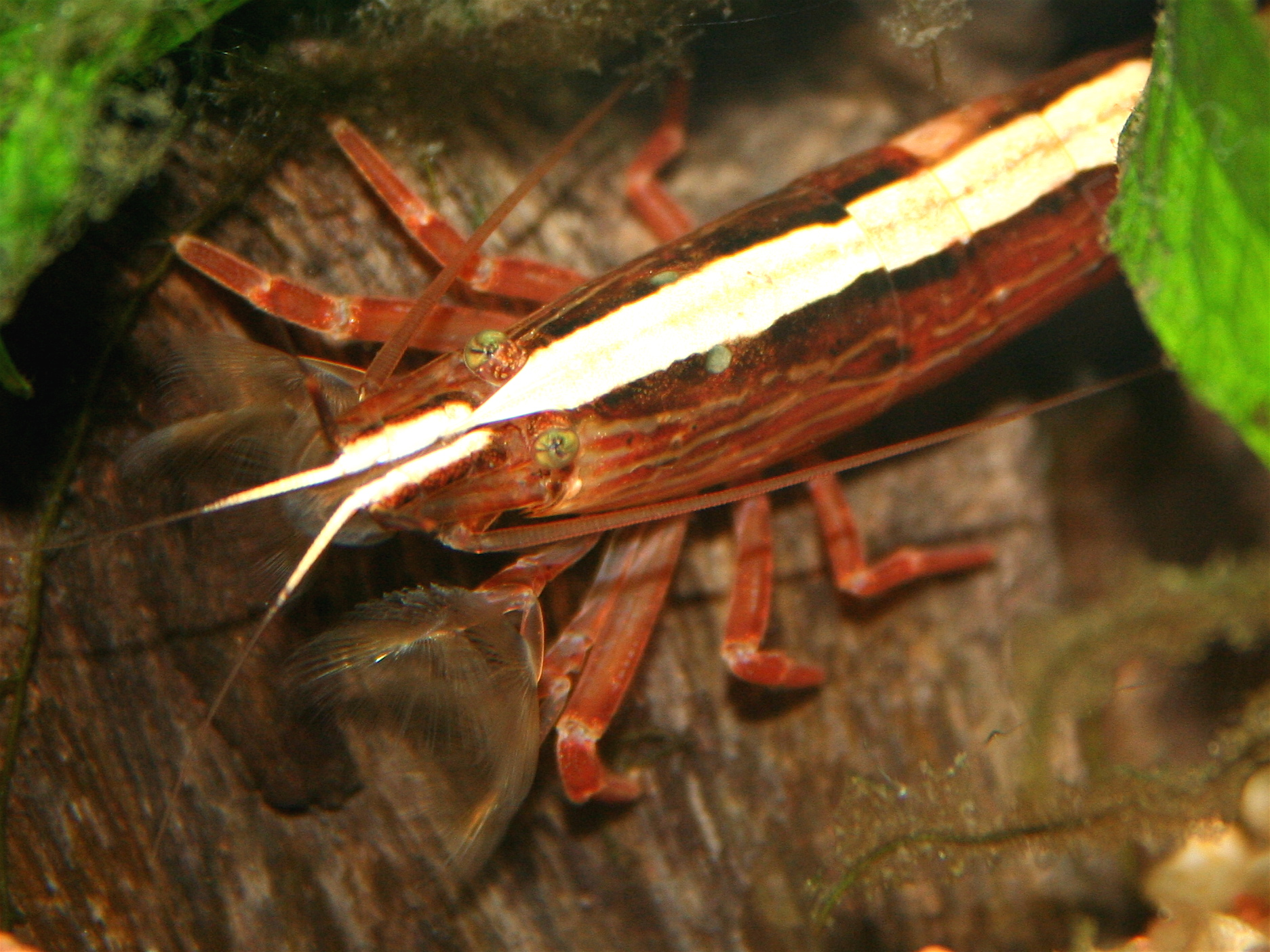
- Atyopsis moluccensis

Scientific classification
- Domain: Eukaryota
- Kingdom: Animalia
- Phylum: Arthropoda
- Class: Malacostraca
- Order: Decapoda
- Suborder: Pleocyemata
- Infraorder: Caridea
- Family: Atyidae
- Genus: Atyopsis; Chace, 1983

Type species
- Atya spinipes Newport, 1847

= Atyopsis =

Genus of crustaceans

Atyopsis is a genus of freshwater shrimp from Southeast Asia. It was erected in 1983 by Fenner A. Chace, Jr. for two species formerly treated in the genus Atya. It differs from Atya by various characters, including the form of the telson (which is longest at the corners in Atyopsis, but not in Atya) and the presence of a "massive spur" on the male third pereiopod.

The genus comprises two species, Atyopsis spinipes and Atyopsis moluccensis. No fossil representatives are known. They are found on volcanic islands from Sri Lanka to the Samoan Islands, and as far north as Okinawa, as well as on the Asian mainland from the Malay Peninsula to India. The two species differ in the number of teeth on the underside of the rostrum, with A. spinipes having 2–6, while A. moluccensis has 7–16.

When kept in the aquarium this species prefers to have a moderate water flow. This shrimp feeds using its feather like claspers to filter particles from the water. If food is scarce you may find them foraging through the substrate.

Like any other crustacean the bamboo shrimp will molt in order to grow. During this process the shrimp is very vulnerable to predation so ample hiding spaces should be provided e.g. small cave structures, dense foliage, etc.

Its diet consists of plant and or algae particles.

== Species ==
This genus contains the following species:

Photo	English name	Latin name
	Bamboo shrimp	Atyopsis moluccensis
	Dwarf bamboo shrimp	Atyopsis spinipes
