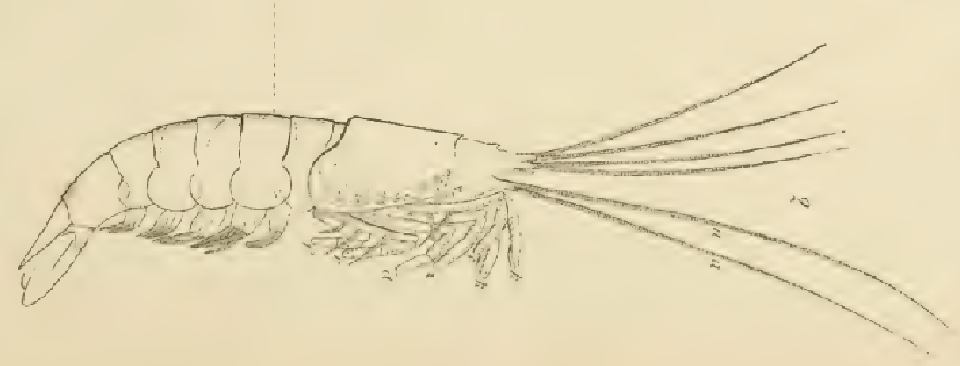
- Illustration of Udorella agassizi

Scientific classification
- Kingdom: Animalia
- Phylum: Arthropoda
- Class: Malacostraca
- Order: Decapoda
- Suborder: Pleocyemata
- Infraorder: Procarididea
- Family: †Udorellidae; Van Straelen, 1925
- Genus: †Udorella; Oppel, 1862

Type species
- †Udorella agassizi Oppel, 1862

= Udorella =

Udorella Temporal range: Late Jurassic (Tithonian)

Extinct genus of shrimp

Udorella is an extinct genus of procarididean shrimp, and the sole member of the family Udorellidae. It lived in what is now modern day Bavaria during the Tithonian stage of the Late Jurassic period.
