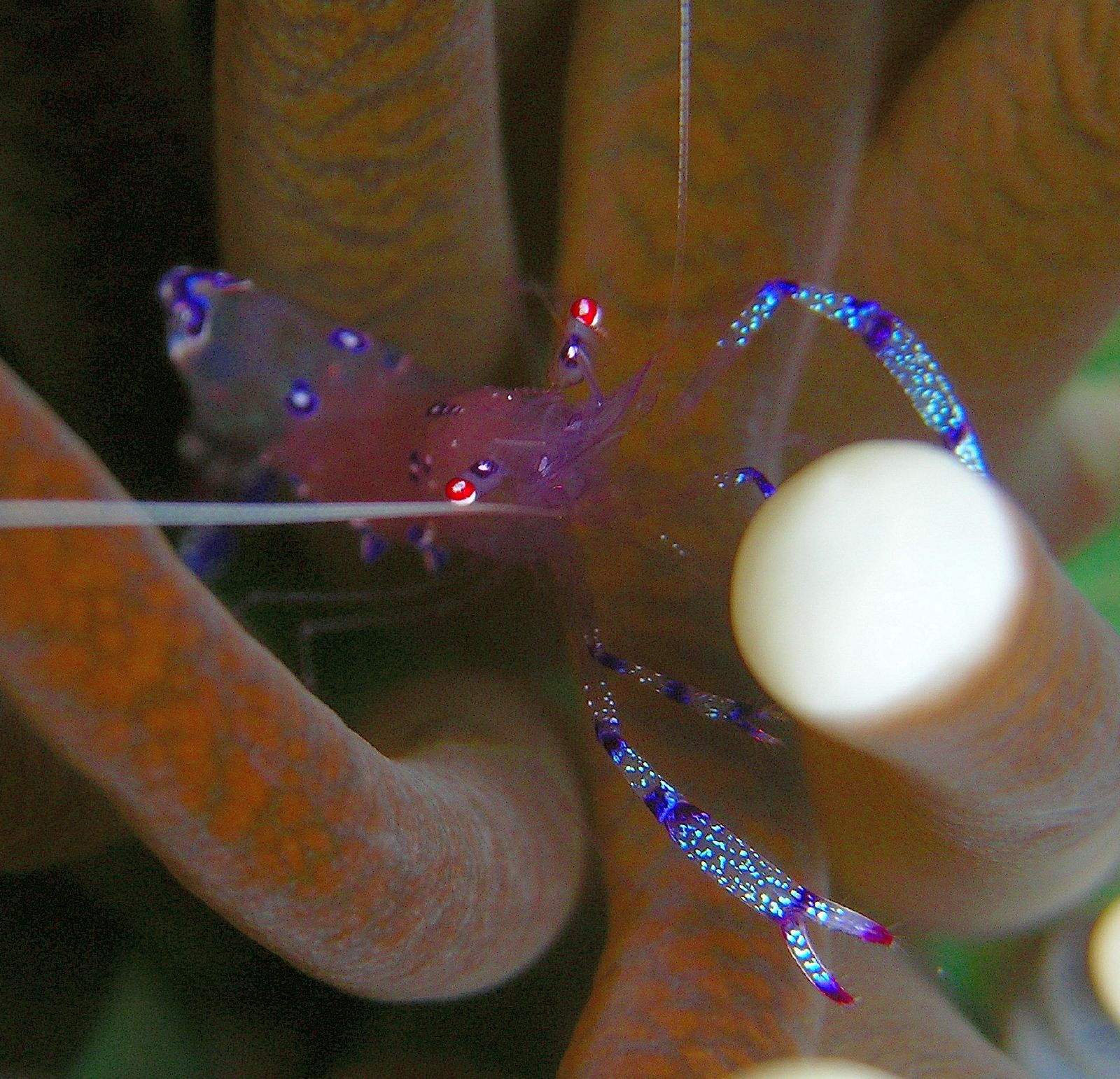

Scientific classification
- Kingdom: Animalia
- Phylum: Arthropoda
- Clade: Pancrustacea
- Class: Malacostraca
- Order: Decapoda
- Suborder: Pleocyemata
- Infraorder: Caridea
- Family: Palaemonidae
- Genus: Ancylomenes
- Species: A. holthuisi

Binomial name
- Ancylomenes holthuisi (Bruce, 1969)

Synonyms
- Periclimenes holthuisi Bruce, 1969

= Ancylomenes holthuisi =

Species of crustacean

Ancylomenes holthuisi is a species of marine shrimp in the family Palaemonidae. It was first described in 1969 by A.J. Bruce as Periclimenes holthuisi.

It is widespread throughout the tropical waters of the Indo-West Pacific. It is a cleaner shrimp and usually lives in association with sea anemones, scleractinian corals or jellyfish.
