= Parhippolyte sterreri =

Conservation status
- Critically Endangered (IUCN 2.3)

Scientific classification
- Kingdom: Animalia
- Phylum: Arthropoda
- Class: Malacostraca
- Order: Decapoda
- Suborder: Pleocyemata
- Infraorder: Caridea
- Family: Barbouriidae
- Genus: Parhippolyte
- Species: P. sterreri

Binomial name
- Parhippolyte sterreri (Hart & Manning, 1981)

Species of crustacean

Parhippolyte sterreri is a species of marine decapod crustacean in the family Barbouriidae, formerly placed in the genus Somersiella. It is found in marine caves around the Bahamas, Cuba and Mexico and inland anchialine caves in Bermuda.

== Description ==
Sterrer's cave shrimp is bright red with narrow white bands at the joints of the swimming legs and three white spots on the tail. The head has prominent dark eyes and long antennae. The specialised appendages which help to trap prey are red at the base, fading to white towards the tip. The rostrum is short, smooth and rounded. The abdominal segments are rounded and the fifth segment possesses a sharp spine.

== Biology ==
A female shrimp collected on Cozumel had 2000 tiny eggs attached to its pleopods. Their small size suggests that the larvae remain in the plankton for a long time.
