= Platythelphusa idjiwiensis =

Conservation status
- Endangered (IUCN 3.1)

Scientific classification
- Kingdom: Animalia
- Phylum: Arthropoda
- Class: Malacostraca
- Order: Decapoda
- Suborder: Pleocyemata
- Infraorder: Brachyura
- Family: Potamonautidae
- Genus: Platythelphusa
- Species: P. idjiwiensis

Binomial name
- Platythelphusa idjiwiensis (Chace, 1942)

Synonyms
- Potamon idjiwiensis Chace, 1942

Species of crab

Platythelphusa idjiwiensis is a species of crab in the family Potamonautidae. It is endemic to the island of Idjwi in Lake Kivu, the Democratic Republic of the Congo. Its natural habitats are streams and other freshwater habitats.
