= Heterosquilla =

Scientific classification
- Kingdom: Animalia
- Phylum: Arthropoda
- Class: Malacostraca
- Order: Stomatopoda
- Family: Tetrasquillidae
- Genus: Heterosquilla; Manning, 1963

Genus of crustaceans

Heterosquilla is a genus of shrimps belonging to the family Tetrasquillidae. This genus was originally described by Raymond B. Manning in 1963.

The species of this genus are found in Southern America, Southeastern Asia and New Zealand.

Species:

- Heterosquilla armata (Smith, 1881)
- Heterosquilla koning Ahyong, 2012
- Heterosquilla laevis (Hutton, 1879)
- Heterosquilla pentadactyla Ahyong, 2001
- Heterosquilla platensis (Berg, 1900)
- Heterosquilla polydactyla (von Martens, 1881)
- Heterosquilla tricarinata (Claus, 1871)
- Heterosquilla tridentata (Thomson, 1882) 1881
- Heterosquilla trifida Ahyong, 2012
