= Potamonautes choloensis =

Conservation status
- Least Concern (IUCN 3.1)

Scientific classification
- Kingdom: Animalia
- Phylum: Arthropoda
- Class: Malacostraca
- Order: Decapoda
- Suborder: Pleocyemata
- Infraorder: Brachyura
- Family: Potamonautidae
- Genus: Potamonautes
- Species: P. choloensis

Binomial name
- Potamonautes choloensis (Chace, 1953)

Synonyms
- Potamon choloensis Chace, 1953

Species of crab

Potamonautes choloensis is a species of freshwater crustacean in the family Potamonautidae.

== Range and habitat ==
Potamonautes choloensis is native to mountain rivers and streams in portions of Malawi, Tanzania, and Mozambique. In has been found in the Nyika Plateau, Zomba Plateau, and Mulanje Massif of Malawi, the mountains of southwestern Tanzania bordering Lake Malawi, and on Mount Mabu and Mount Inago, isolated inselbergs in northern Mozambique.

Its natural habitat is mountain rivers and streams. It is found between 1,829 and 2,134 meters elevation on the Nyika Plateau, at 1,981 meters near Rumphi in Nyika National Park, at 1,800 meters on the Zomba Plateau, up to 2,500 meters on Chambe Peak in the Mulanje Massif, and at 1,700 meters on Mount Mabu.
