= Ancylomenes adularans =

Scientific classification
- Domain: Eukaryota
- Kingdom: Animalia
- Phylum: Arthropoda
- Class: Malacostraca
- Order: Decapoda
- Suborder: Pleocyemata
- Infraorder: Caridea
- Family: Palaemonidae
- Genus: Ancylomenes
- Species: A. adularans

Binomial name
- Ancylomenes adularans (A. J. Bruce, 2003)

Species of crustacean

Ancylomenes adularans is a species of shrimp. It was first named by A. J. Bruce in 2003 in a journal article entitled "Periclimenes species (Crustacea: Decapoda: Pontoniinae) from far North Queens-land".
