= Tetrasquillidae =

Scientific classification
- Kingdom: Animalia
- Phylum: Arthropoda
- Clade: Pancrustacea
- Class: Malacostraca
- Order: Stomatopoda
- Superfamily: Lysiosquilloidea
- Family: Tetrasquillidae; Manning & Camp, 1993

Genera
- See text

Family of crustaceans

Tetrasquillidae is a family of mantis shrimp containing eleven genera:

- Acaenosquilla Manning, 1991
- Allosquilla Manning, 1977
- Colubrisquilla Ahyong, 2012
- Heterosquilla Manning, 1963
- Heterosquilloides Manning, 1966
- Heterosquillopsis Moosa, 1991
- Incertasquilla Ahyong, Nakajima & Naruse, 2024
- Kasim Manning, 1995
- Pariliacantha Ahyong, 2012
- Tectasquilla Adkison & Hopkins, 1984
- Tetrasquilla Manning & Chace, 1990

== See also ==
- Heterosquilla tricarinata
