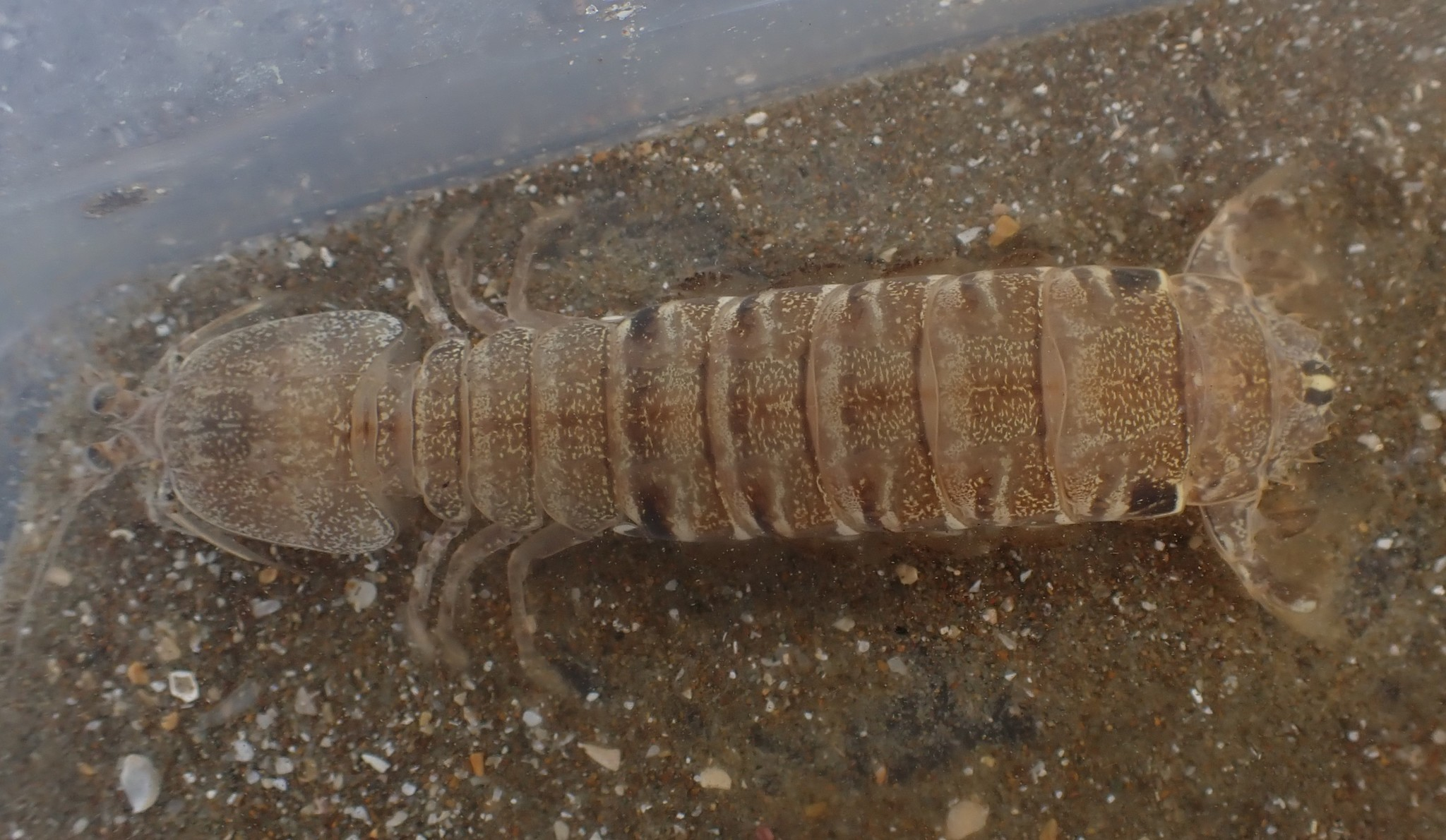
- Pariliacantha georgeorum

Scientific classification
- Domain: Eukaryota
- Kingdom: Animalia
- Phylum: Arthropoda
- Class: Malacostraca
- Order: Stomatopoda
- Family: Tetrasquillidae
- Genus: Pariliacantha; Ahyong, 2012
- Species: P. georgeorum

Binomial name
- Pariliacantha georgeorum Ahyong, 2012

= Pariliacantha =

Genus of crustaceans

Pariliacantha is a genus of mantis shrimp containing a single species, Pariliacantha georgeorum. The genus and species were first described by Shane T. Ahyong in 2012.
