= Tetrasquilla =

Scientific classification
- Kingdom: Animalia
- Phylum: Arthropoda
- Class: Malacostraca
- Order: Stomatopoda
- Family: Tetrasquillidae
- Genus: Tetrasquilla; Manning & Chace, 1990
- Species: T. mccullochae

Binomial name
- Tetrasquilla mccullochae (Schmitt, 1940)

Synonyms
- Lysiosquilla mccullochae Schmitt, 1940; Heterosquilloides mccullochae (Schmitt, 1940); Heterosquilla jonesi Shanbhogue, 1971

Genus of crustaceans

Tetrasquilla is a genus of mantis shrimp containing a single species, Tetrasquilla mccullochae. It is the only known pantropical stomatopod. The specific epithet commemorates Dr. Irene A. McCulloch, professor of zoology of the University of Southern California.
