= Crassispira chacei =

Scientific classification
- Kingdom: Animalia
- Phylum: Mollusca
- Class: Gastropoda
- Subclass: Caenogastropoda
- Order: Neogastropoda
- Superfamily: Conoidea
- Family: Pseudomelatomidae
- Genus: Crassispira
- Species: C. chacei

Binomial name
- Crassispira chacei Hertlein & Strong, 1951

Species of gastropod

Crassispira chacei is a species of marine gastropod in the family Pseudomelatomidae.

== Description ==
It has a stout, brownish shell and resembles Crassispira turricula. The shell is 30 millimetres (1.2 in) long, and 11 mm (0.43 in) wide. The specific epithet chacei commemorates Fenner A. Chace Jr.

== Distribution ==
This marine species occurs in the southern part of the Sea of Cortez, Western Mexico
