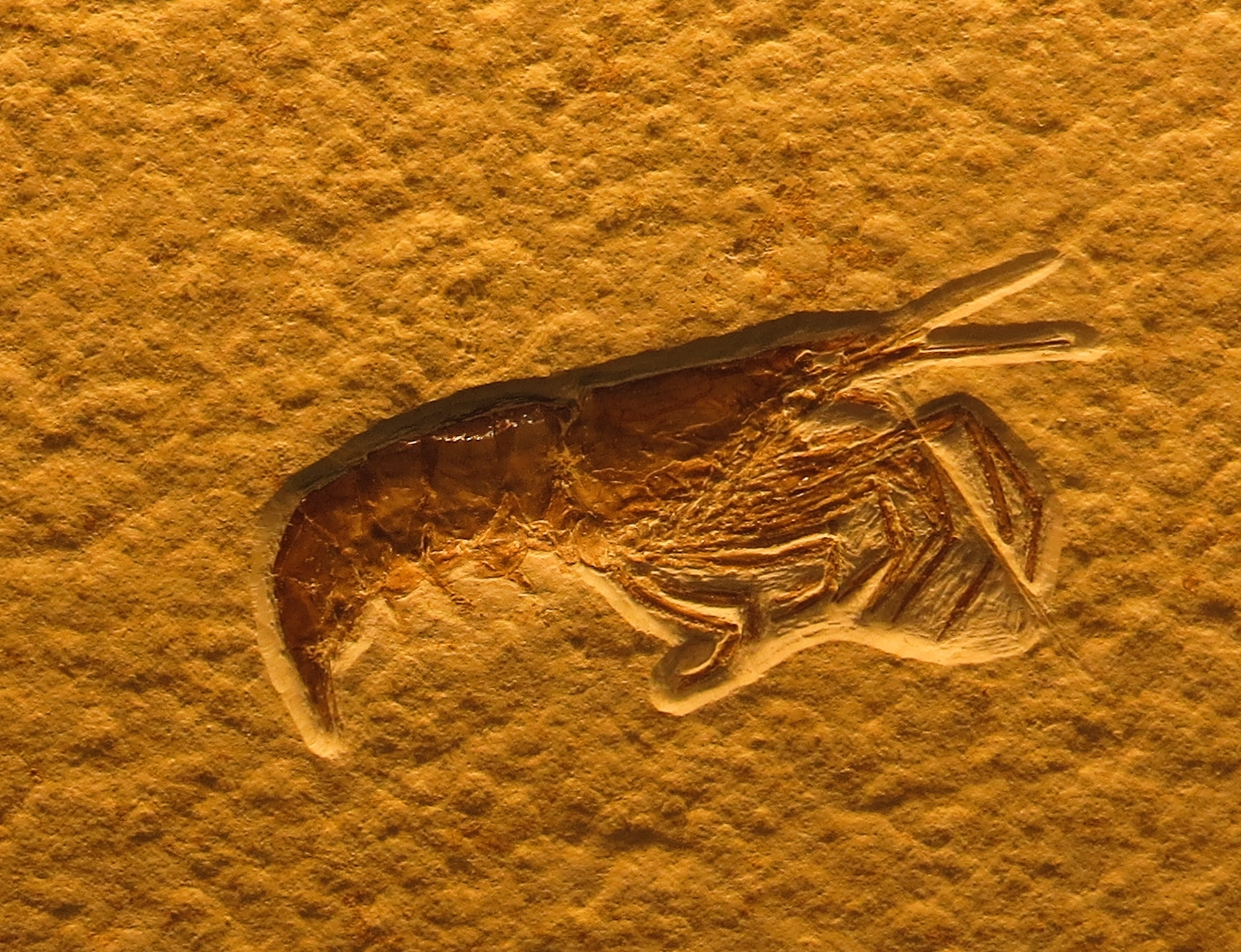
- Udora brevispina

Scientific classification
- Kingdom: Animalia
- Phylum: Arthropoda
- Class: Malacostraca
- Order: Decapoda
- Suborder: Pleocyemata
- Infraorder: Procarididea
- Genus: †Udora; Münster, 1839

Type species
- †Udora brevispina Münster, 1839

Other species
- †Udora angulata Münster, 1839; †Udora bigoti Van Straelen, 1925; †Udora gevreyi Van Straelen, 1923; †Udora koschnyi Schweigert & Garassino, 2004; †Udora minuta Van Straelen, 1923

= Udora (crustacean) =

Udora Temporal range: Middle-Late Jurassic (Callovian-Tithonian)

Extinct genus of crustacean

Udora is an extinct genus of procarididean shrimp that lived in what is now present day England, France and northern Germany from the Callovian stage of the Middle Jurassic to the Tithonian age of the Late Jurassic. The genus is named after Uðr, one of the Nine Daughters of Ægir and Rán in Norse mythology.
