= Incertasquilla =

Scientific classification
- Domain: Eukaryota
- Kingdom: Animalia
- Phylum: Arthropoda
- Class: Malacostraca
- Order: Stomatopoda
- Family: Tetrasquillidae
- Genus: Incertasquilla; Ahyong, Nakajima & Naruse, 2024
- Species: I. chimera

Binomial name
- Incertasquilla chimera Ahyong, Nakajima & Naruse, 2024

Species of shrimp

Incertasquilla is a monotypic genus of mantis shrimp. The only species, Incertasquilla chimera, is commonly known as the chimera mantis shrimp and was discovered off the coasts of Western Australia and Japan. It is notable for its unique morphology, which led scientists to establish it in a new genus.

== Discovery ==
The first specimen of Incertasquilla chimera was collected in 2008 during marine surveys near the Ningaloo coast of Western Australia by Japanese researchers. It was subsequently sent to crustacean expert Shane T. Ahyong, then based at New Zealand's National Institute of Water and Atmospheric Research. Ahyong recognized it as a distinct species due to its unusual features, particularly the structure of its tail fan and head. Subsequent specimens were found near Iheya Island, Japan, confirming the species' broader distribution in the Indo-Pacific region.

== Description ==
Measuring approximately 9 cm (3.5 in) in length, Incertasquilla chimera is classified as small to medium-sized among mantis shrimp. It displays striped coloration and prominent false eye spots on its tail, likely used to deter predators.

The species is equipped with spiny claws that unfold at remarkable speeds, up to 8 m/s (26 ft/s), to impale swift-moving prey such as small fish. The rapid strike, occurring within 4 milliseconds, is typically only visible using a slow-motion camera.

Its highly complex eyes, capable of independent movement and detecting a broad spectrum of light wavelengths, are characteristic of mantis shrimp and facilitate exceptional depth perception and target tracking.

== Taxonomy ==
Incertasquilla chimera is so morphologically distinct that it could not be assigned to any existing mantis shrimp family. Although it shares traits with three different families, its combination of features is unique, leading to the creation of a new genus within the superfamily Lysiosquilloidea. It is currently placed within the family Tetrasquillidae.

== Etymology ==
The species name chimera refers to the creature Chimera from Greek mythology composed of parts from multiple animals. This name was chosen to reflect the shrimp's unusual combination of features typically seen across several different mantis shrimp families.

== Recognition ==
Incertasquilla chimera was named one of the Top 10 Marine Species Discoveries of 2024 by the World Register of Marine Species.
