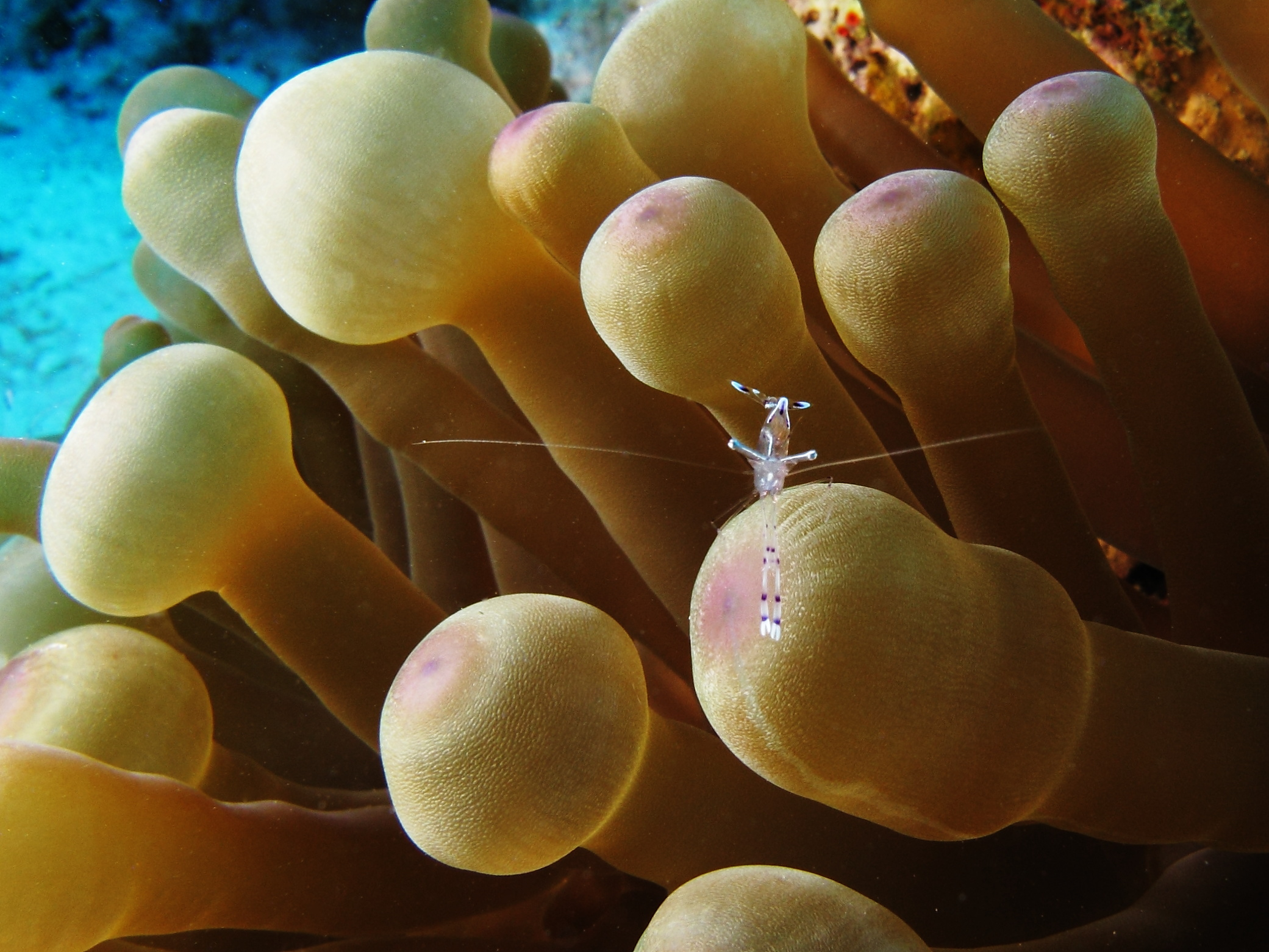
- A. longicarpus on bubble anemone (Red Sea, Egypt)

Scientific classification
- Kingdom: Animalia
- Phylum: Arthropoda
- Clade: Pancrustacea
- Class: Malacostraca
- Order: Decapoda
- Suborder: Pleocyemata
- Infraorder: Caridea
- Family: Palaemonidae
- Genus: Ancylomenes
- Species: A. longicarpus

Binomial name
- Ancylomenes longicarpus (Bruce & Svoboda, 1983)

Synonyms
- Periclimenes longicarpus

= Ancylomenes longicarpus =

Species of crustacean

Ancylomenes longicarpus (also known as long-arm cleaner shrimp or anemone partner shrimp) is a species of shrimp found in the Red Sea. Its tiny (length up to 2.5 cm) body is transparent with white and purple spots on tail and white line between eyes. It is often associated with corals from genera Xenia, Plerogyra and anemones Entacmaea quadricolor, Heteractis crispa.

Ancylomenes-longicarpus on Plerogyra-sinuosa
