= Procaris mexicana =

Scientific classification
- Kingdom: Animalia
- Phylum: Arthropoda
- Class: Malacostraca
- Order: Decapoda
- Suborder: Pleocyemata
- Family: Procarididae
- Genus: Procaris
- Species: P. mexicana

Binomial name
- Procaris mexicana von Sternberg & Schotte, 2004

Species of crustacean

Procaris mexicana is a species of shrimp in the genus Procaris that lives in the Yucatán Peninsula.
