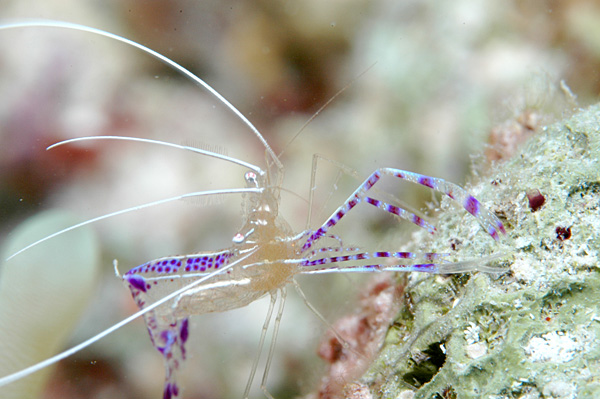
- Ancylomenes pedersoni

Scientific classification
- Domain: Eukaryota
- Kingdom: Animalia
- Phylum: Arthropoda
- Class: Malacostraca
- Order: Decapoda
- Suborder: Pleocyemata
- Infraorder: Caridea
- Family: Palaemonidae
- Genus: Ancylomenes; Okuno & Bruce, 2010

Type species
- Periclimenes venustus Bruce, 1990

= Ancylomenes =

Genus of crustaceans

Ancylomenes is a genus of shrimp, erected in 2010 to accommodate the group of species around "Periclimenes aesopius" (now Ancylomenes aesopius). Members of the genus are widely distributed in the warm oceans of the world, and live in association with cnidarians; most are cleaner shrimp.

The genus Ancylomenes contains the following species:

- Ancylomenes adularans (Bruce, 2003)
- Ancylomenes aesopius (Spence Bate, 1863)
- Ancylomenes amirantei (Bruce, 2007)
- Ancylomenes aqabai (Bruce, 2008)
- Ancylomenes grandidens (Bruce, 2005)
- Ancylomenes holthuisi (Bruce, 1969)
- Ancylomenes kobayashii (Okuno & Nomura, 2002)
- Ancylomenes kuboi Bruce, 2010
- Ancylomenes longicarpus (Bruce & Svoboda, 1983)
- Ancylomenes lucasi (Chace, 1937)
- Ancylomenes luteomaculatus Okuno & Bruce, 2010
- Ancylomenes magnificus (Bruce, 1979)
- Ancylomenes okunoi Bruce, 2010
- Ancylomenes pedersoni (Chace, 1958)
- Ancylomenes sarasvati (Okuno, 2002)
- Ancylomenes speciosus (Okuno, 2004)
- Ancylomenes tenuirostris (Bruce, 1991)
- Ancylomenes tosaensis (Kubo, 1951)
- Ancylomenes venustus (Bruce, 1989)

== Gallery ==
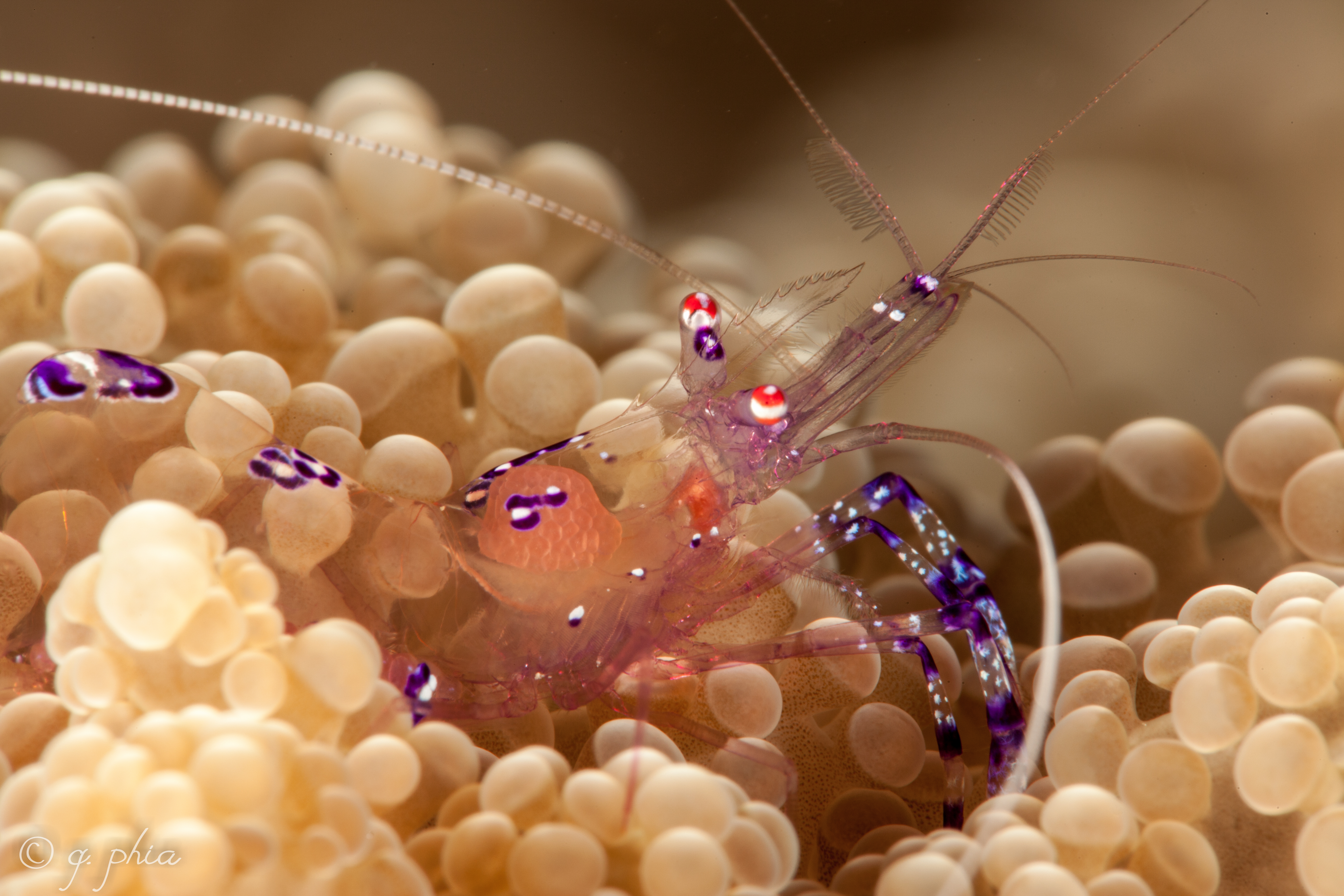
Ancylomenes sarasvati at Wakatobi National Park

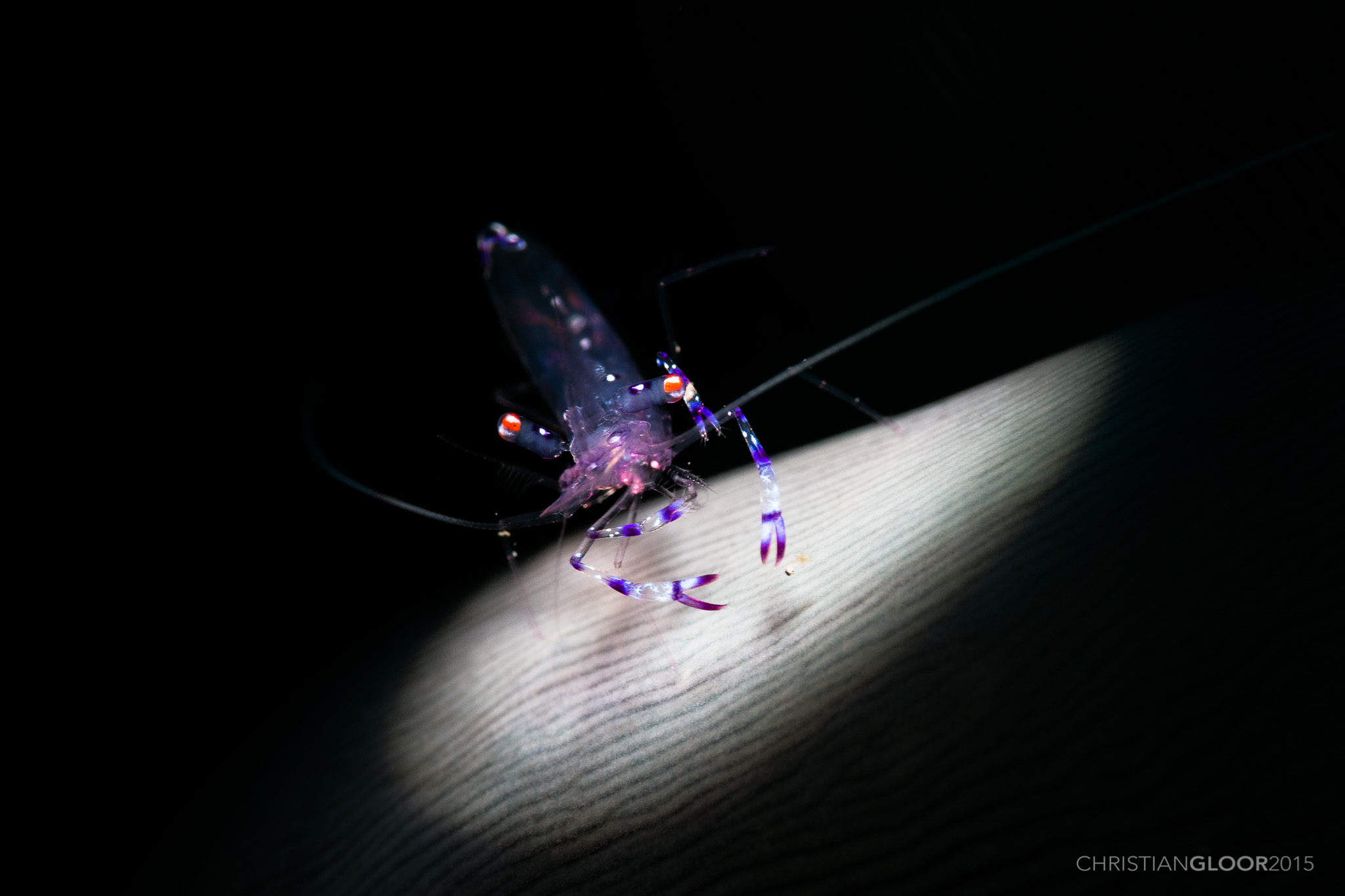
Ancylomenes sarasvati in the spotlight at Wakatobi National Park

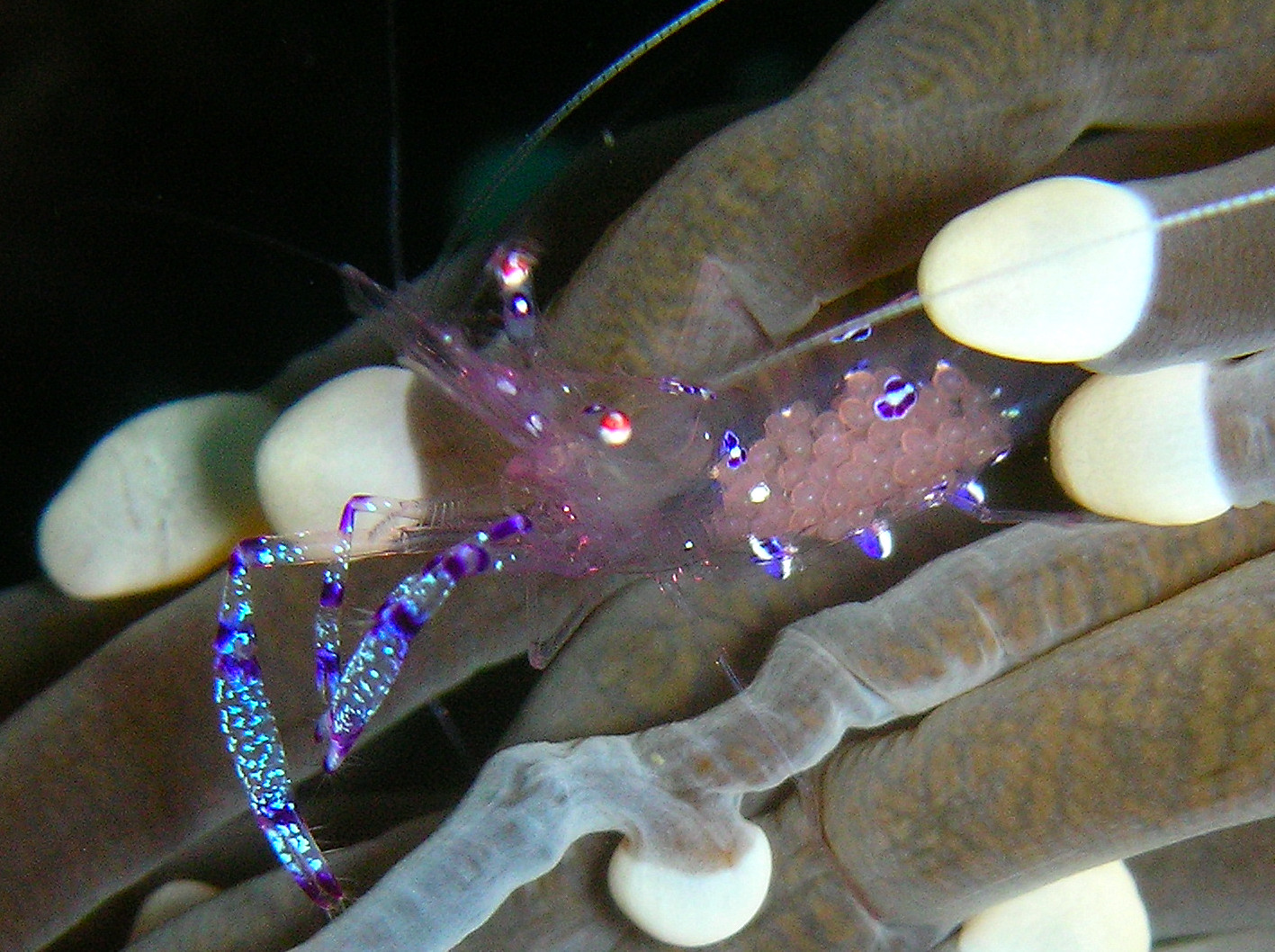
Ancylomenes sarasvati with eggs

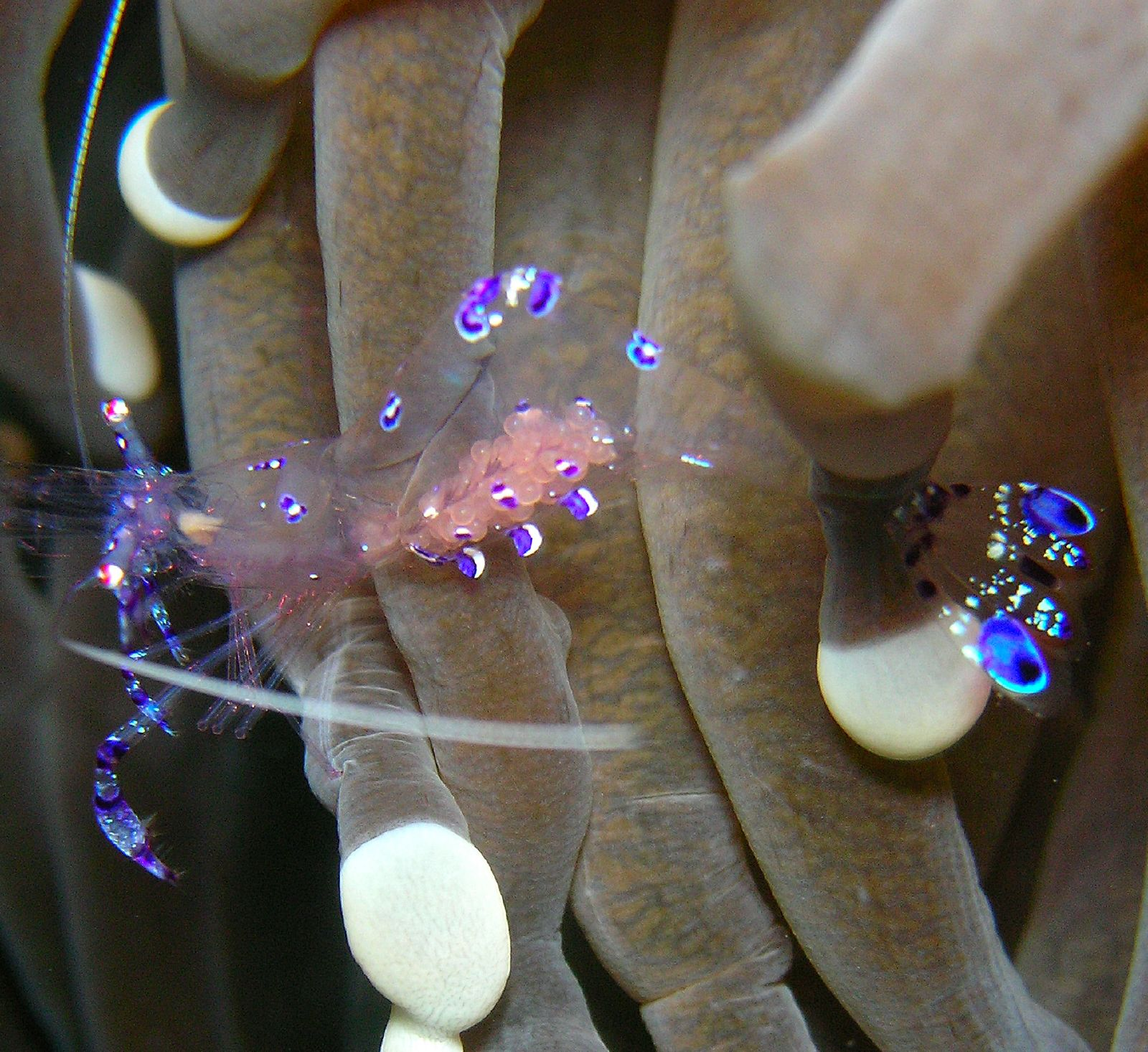
Ancylomenes sarasvati with eggs

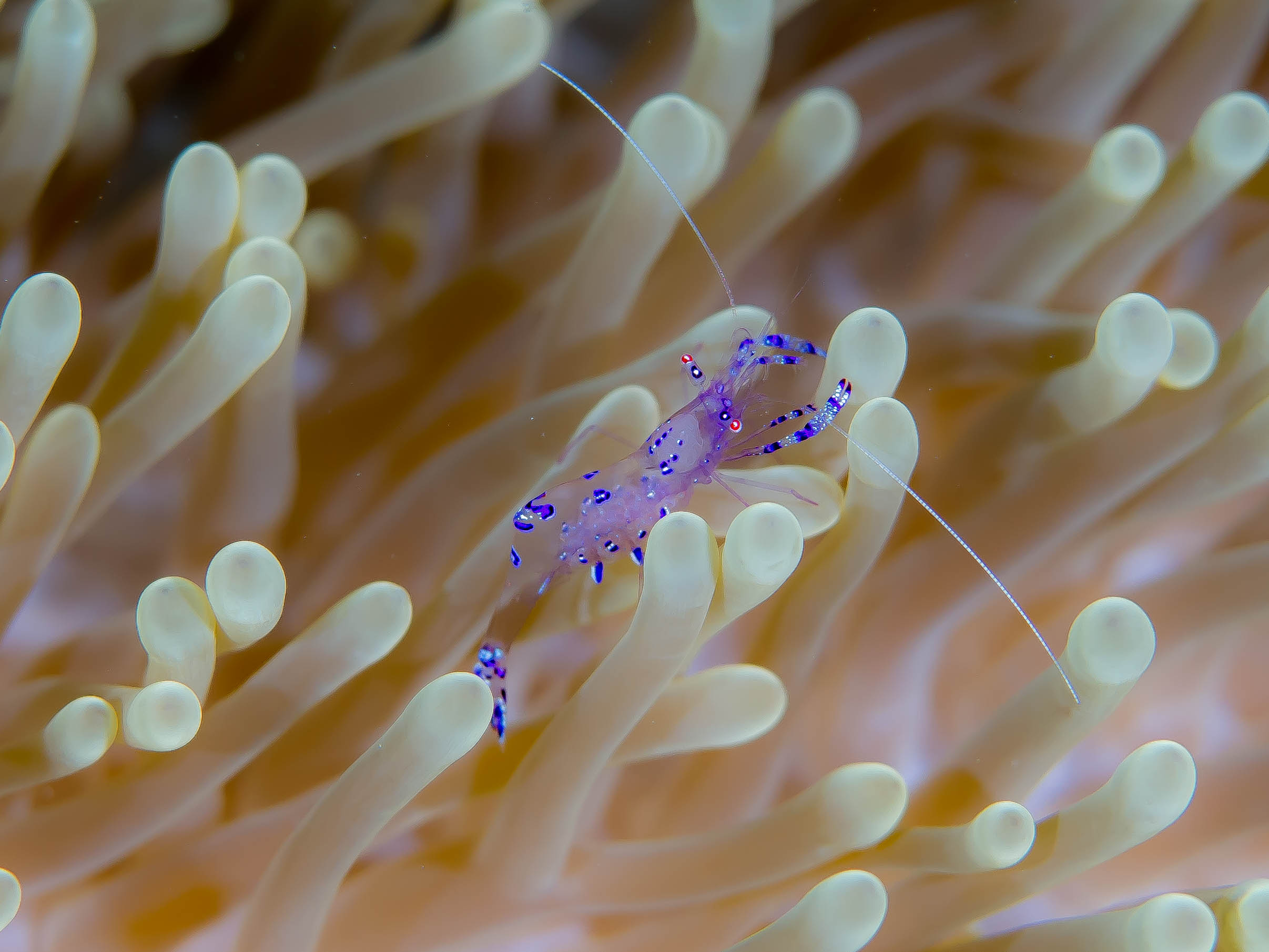
Ancylomenes sarasvati at Diving Halmahera with Weda Resort

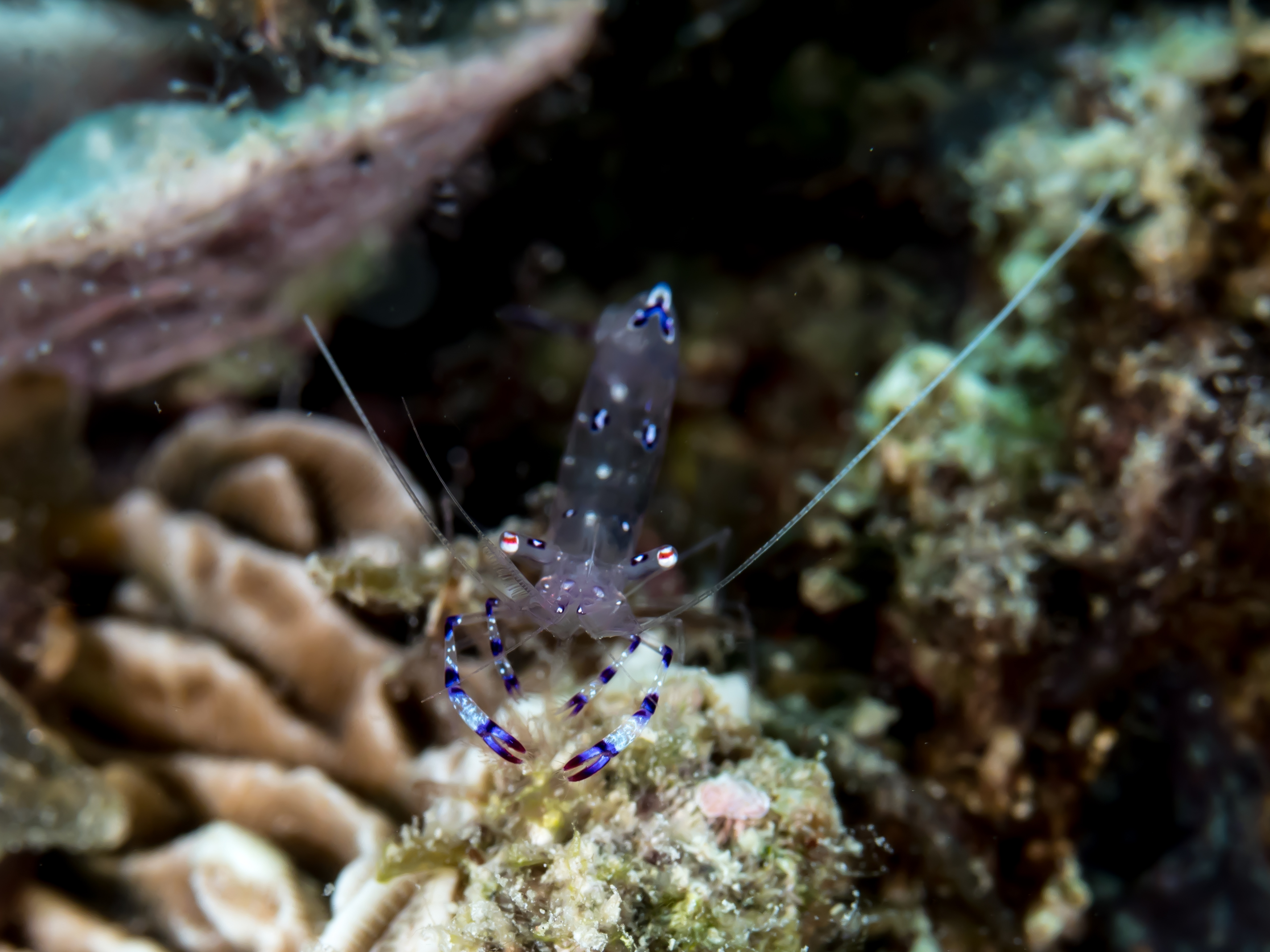
Ancylomenes sarasvati at Romblon, Philippines

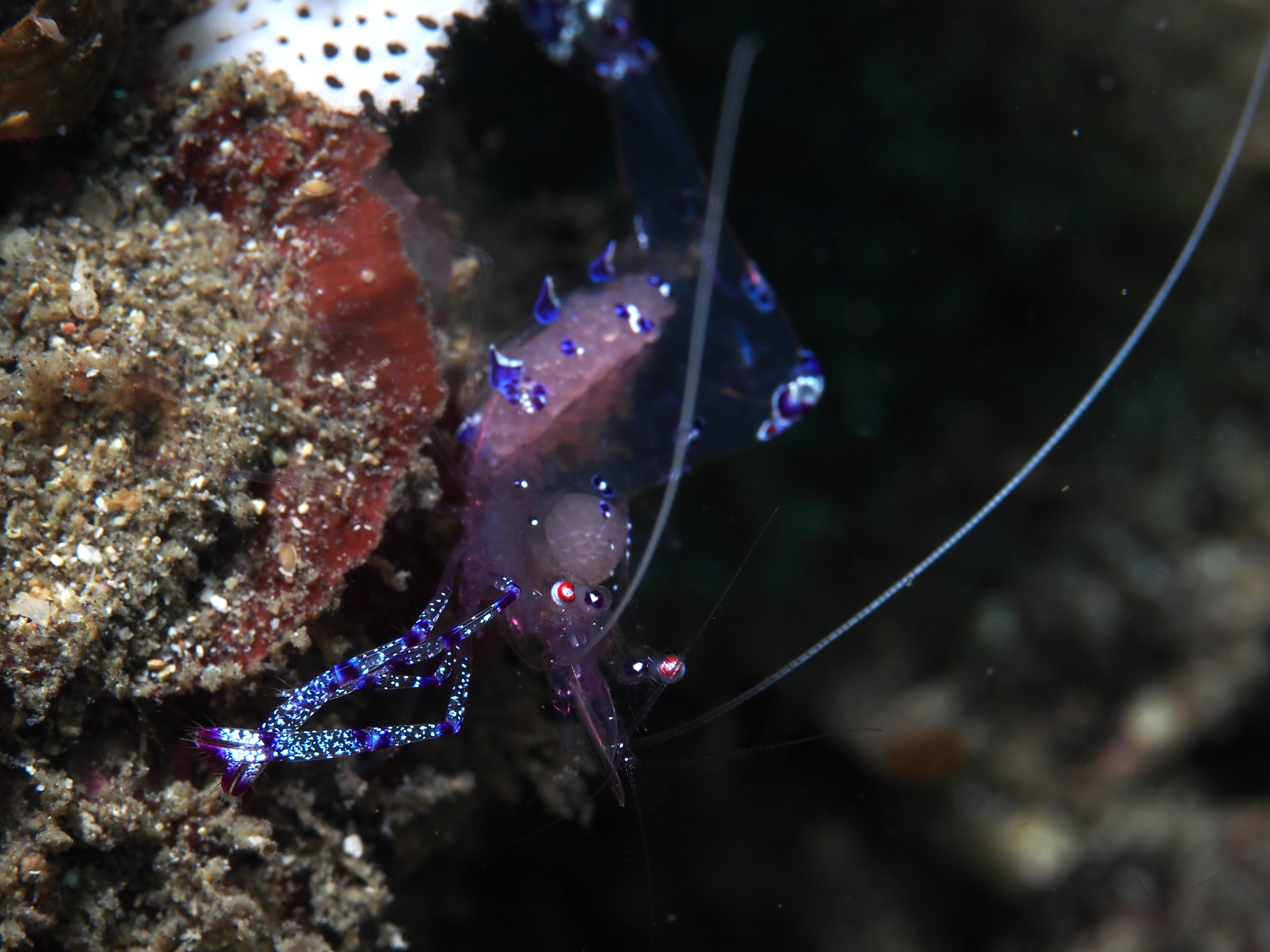
Ancylomenes sarasvati at Lembeh, Indonesia
