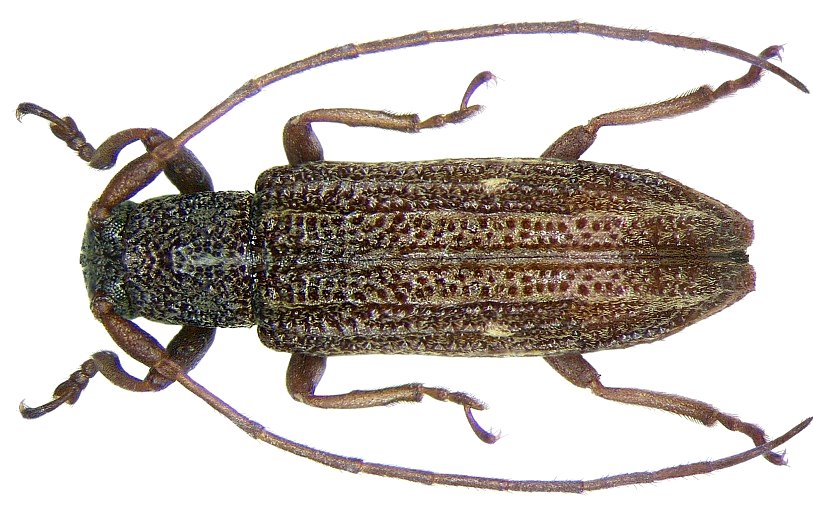
- F. sikkimensis

Scientific classification
- Kingdom: Animalia
- Phylum: Arthropoda
- Class: Insecta
- Order: Coleoptera
- Suborder: Polyphaga
- Infraorder: Cucujiformia
- Family: Cerambycidae
- Tribe: Apomecynini
- Genus: Falsoropica; Breuning, 1939

Type species
- Falsoropica clavipes Breuning, 1939

= Falsoropica =

Genus of beetles

Falsoropica is a genus of beetles in the family Cerambycidae. It was circumscribed by Stephan von Breuning in 1939.

As of 2017, it consists of the following species:

- Falsoropica albopunctata Breuning & Villiers, 1983
- Falsoropica clavipes Breuning, 1939
- Falsoropica grossepunctata Breuning, 1965
- Falsoropica hawaiana Breuning, 1982
- Falsoropica lata Breuning, 1960
- Falsoropica minuta Breuning, 1961
- Falsoropica orousseti Breuning & Villiers, 1983
- Falsoropica sikkimensis Breuning, 1973
- Falsoropica tonkinensis Breuning, 1960
