= Arcopotamonautes montivagus =

Conservation status
- Least Concern (IUCN 3.1)

Scientific classification
- Kingdom: Animalia
- Phylum: Arthropoda
- Class: Malacostraca
- Order: Decapoda
- Suborder: Pleocyemata
- Infraorder: Brachyura
- Family: Potamonautidae
- Genus: Arcopotamonautes
- Species: A. montivagus

Binomial name
- Arcopotamonautes montivagus (Chace, 1953)

Synonyms
- Potamon montivagus Chace, 1953

Species of crab

Arcopotamonautes montivagus is a species of freshwater crustacean in the family Potamonautidae. It is native to southeastern Africa. Its natural habitat is rivers.

== Range and habitat ==
Arcopotamonautes montivagus is found in mountain streams in southwestern Tanzania, northern and southeastern Malawi, western Mozambique, eastern Zambia, and eastern Zimbabwe.

Its native habitat is high-elevation rivers, streams, and lakes.
