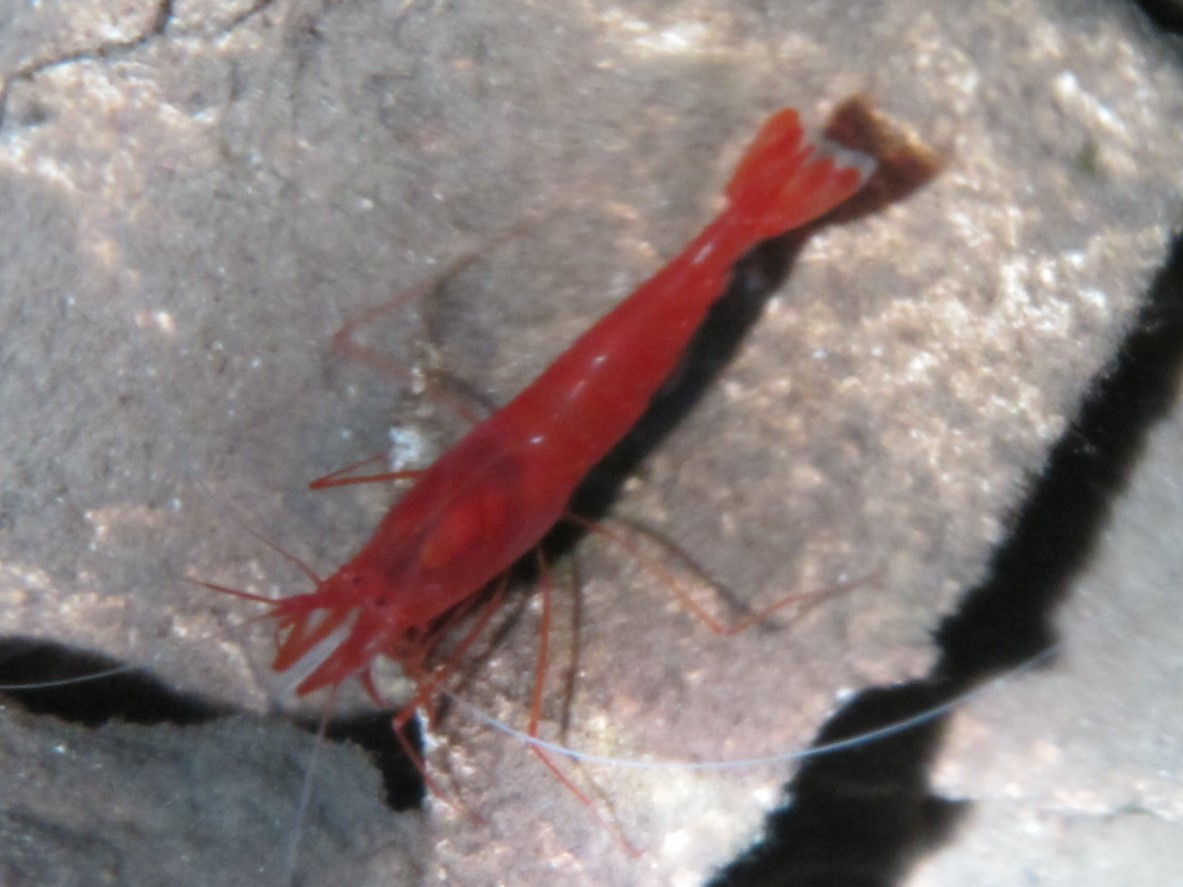

Conservation status
- Critically Endangered (IUCN 3.1)

Scientific classification
- Kingdom: Animalia
- Phylum: Arthropoda
- Class: Malacostraca
- Order: Decapoda
- Suborder: Pleocyemata
- Infraorder: Caridea
- Family: Barbouriidae
- Genus: Barbouria; Rathbun, 1912
- Species: B. cubensis

Binomial name
- Barbouria cubensis (Von Martens, 1872)

Synonyms
- Barbouria poeyi Rathbun, 1912; Barbouria yanezi Mejía, Zarza & López, 2008; Hippolyte cubensis von Martens, 1872

= Barbouria =

Barbouria cubensis

Genus of crustaceans

Barbouria is a genus of shrimp in the family Barbouriidae. It is monotypic, being represented by the single species Barbouria cubensis.

Barbouria cubensis was originally described under the name Hippolyte cubensis from anchialine caves between Cojimar and Castillo Morro, near Havana, Cuba. It has since been found in Mexico, the Turks and Caicos Islands, Bermuda, Cayman Brac and the Bahamas. The animals grow to 64 millimetres (2.5 in) long and are a deep red colour. It is listed as a critically endangered species on the IUCN Red List.
