= Calliasmata =

Scientific classification
- Domain: Eukaryota
- Kingdom: Animalia
- Phylum: Arthropoda
- Class: Malacostraca
- Order: Decapoda
- Suborder: Pleocyemata
- Infraorder: Caridea
- Family: Barbouriidae
- Genus: Calliasmata; Holthuis, 1973

Genus of crustaceans

Calliasmata is a genus of shrimp in the family Barbouriidae, containing the following species:

- Calliasmata nohochi Escobar-Briones et al., 1997
- Calliasmata pholidota Holthuis, 1973
- Calliasmata rimolii Chace, 1975
