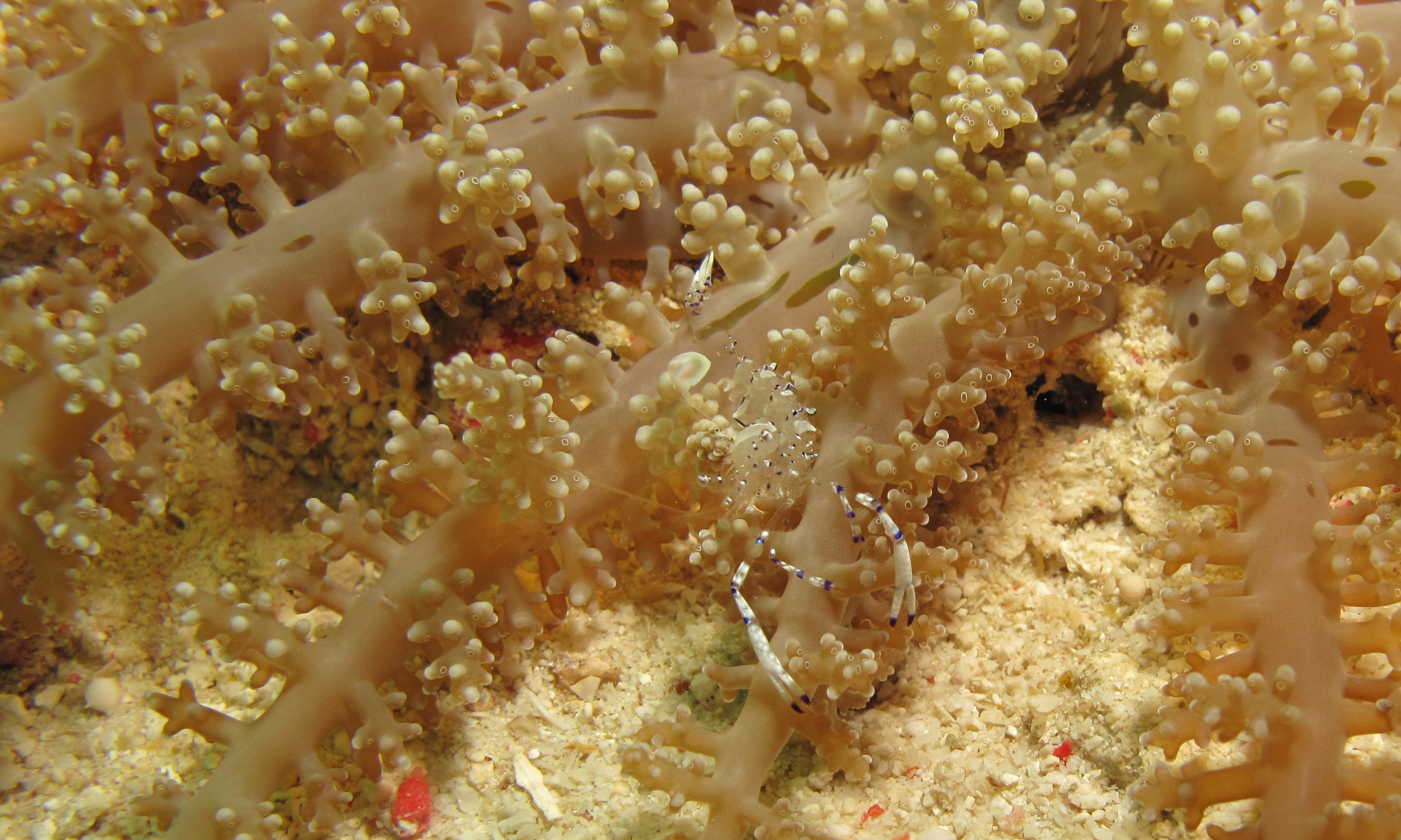
- Eel Garden, Pulau Mabul, Sabah, MALAYSIA

Scientific classification
- Kingdom: Animalia
- Phylum: Arthropoda
- Clade: Pancrustacea
- Class: Malacostraca
- Order: Decapoda
- Suborder: Pleocyemata
- Infraorder: Caridea
- Family: Palaemonidae
- Genus: Ancylomenes
- Species: A. venustus

Binomial name
- Ancylomenes venustus (Bruce, 1989)

= Ancylomenes venustus =

Species of crustacean

Ancylomenes venustus, also known as the graceful anemone shrimp, is a species of shrimp which belongs to the family of the Palaemonidae. This species is found in the tropical waters from the centre of the Indo-Pacific biogeographical area. A. venustus lives in association with scleractinians and actiniarians (sea anemones) and is a cleaner shrimp.
