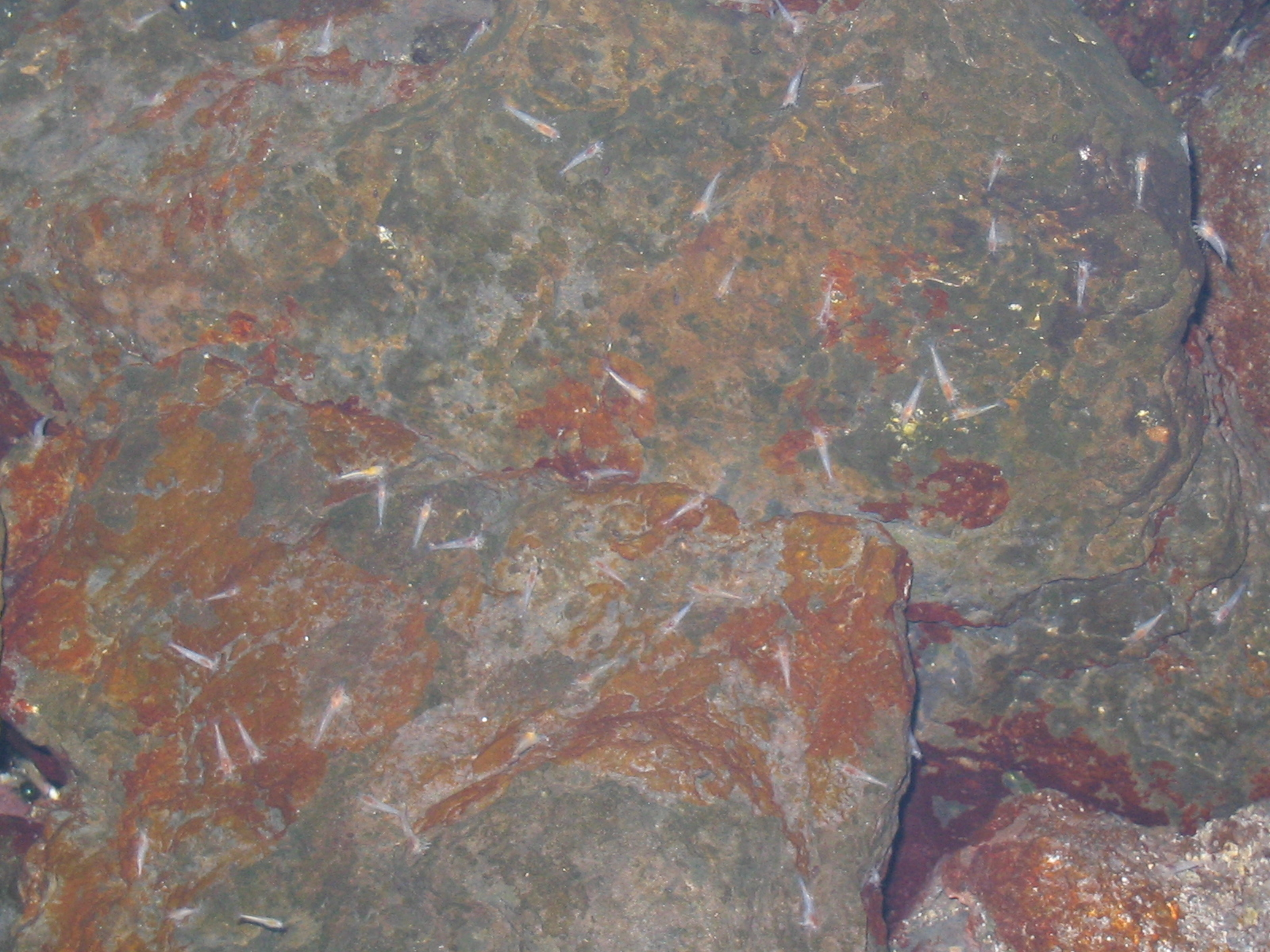
- Procaris ascensionis

Scientific classification
- Domain: Eukaryota
- Kingdom: Animalia
- Phylum: Arthropoda
- Class: Malacostraca
- Order: Decapoda
- Suborder: Pleocyemata
- Family: Procarididae
- Genus: Procaris; Chace & Manning, 1972

= Procaris =

Genus of crustaceans

Procaris is a genus of shrimp in the family Procarididae. It contains the following species:

- Procaris ascensionis Chace & Manning, 1972
- Procaris chacei Hart & Manning, 1986
- Procaris hawaiana Holthuis, 1973
- Procaris mexicana von Sternberg & Schotte, 2004
- Procaris noelensis Bruce & Davie, 2006
