= Manuka State Wayside Park =

State park with an arboretum in Hawaii

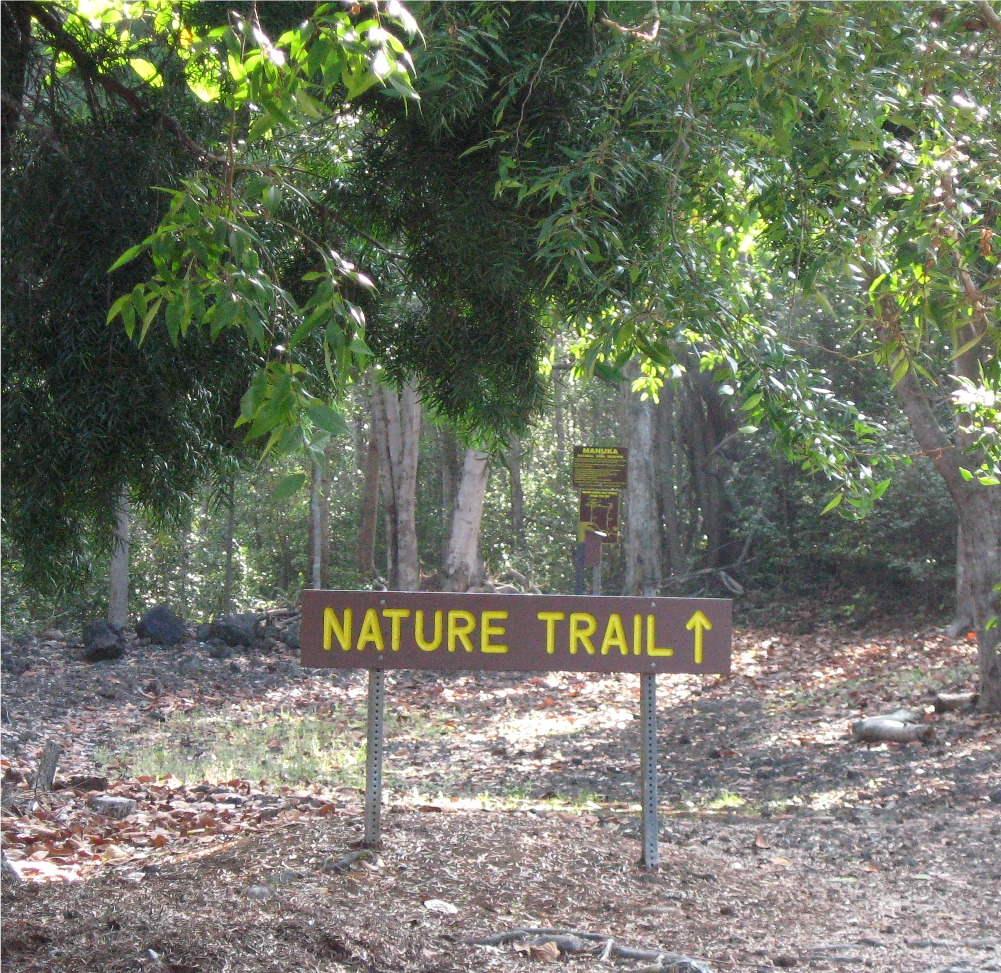
- A short nature trail at the wayside
- Interactive map of Manuka State Wayside Park

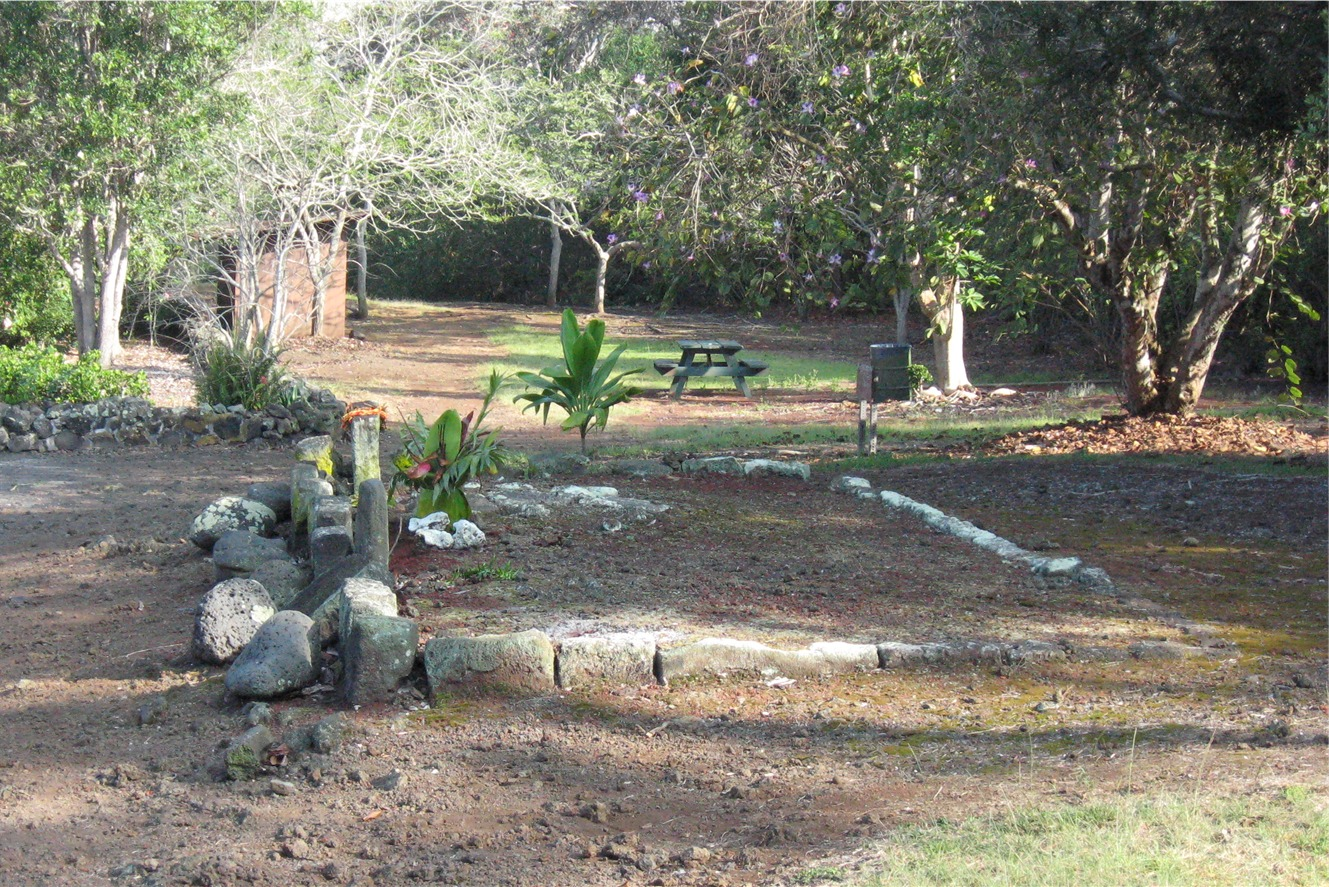
Unidentified grave site

The Manuka State Wayside Park is a state park of 13.4 acres (5.4 ha) with an arboretum located approximately 19 miles (31 km) west of Naʻalehu, on the Mamalahoa Highway (Route 11) section of the Hawaii Belt Road, on the island of Hawaii, Hawaii, coordinates 19°6′33″N 155°49′33″W

The name means "blundering" in the Hawaiian Language, and was the name of the ancient land division (ahupaʻa) that ran from a bay on the southwest side of the island up the slopes of the Mauna Loa volcano. The arboretum of 8 acres (3.2 ha) was originally planted in the mid-19th century with native and introduced plants. It now contains 48 species of native Hawaiian plants and more than 130 species of other exotic plants and flowers, and is surrounded by the 25,550-acre (10,340 ha) Manuka Forest Reserve.

There is also a pit crater on the trail.

Services at the park include restrooms, trash cans, and camping in an open shelter. No drinking water is available at the park.

== See also ==
- List of botanical gardens in the United States
- Natural Area Reserves System Hawaii
