= Falsoropica hawaiana =

Scientific classification
- Kingdom: Animalia
- Phylum: Arthropoda
- Class: Insecta
- Order: Coleoptera
- Suborder: Polyphaga
- Infraorder: Cucujiformia
- Family: Cerambycidae
- Genus: Falsoropica
- Species: F. hawaiana

Binomial name
- Falsoropica hawaiana Breuning, 1982

Species of beetle

Falsoropica hawaiana is a species of beetle in the family Cerambycidae. It was described by Breuning in 1982.
