= Turricula =

Turricula, turret in Latin, may refer to:

- Turricula (plant), a plant genus in the subfamily Hydrophylloideae
- Turricula (gastropod), an animal genus in the family Clavatulidae
