= Carl Friedrich Wilhelm Claus =

German zoologist (1835–1899)

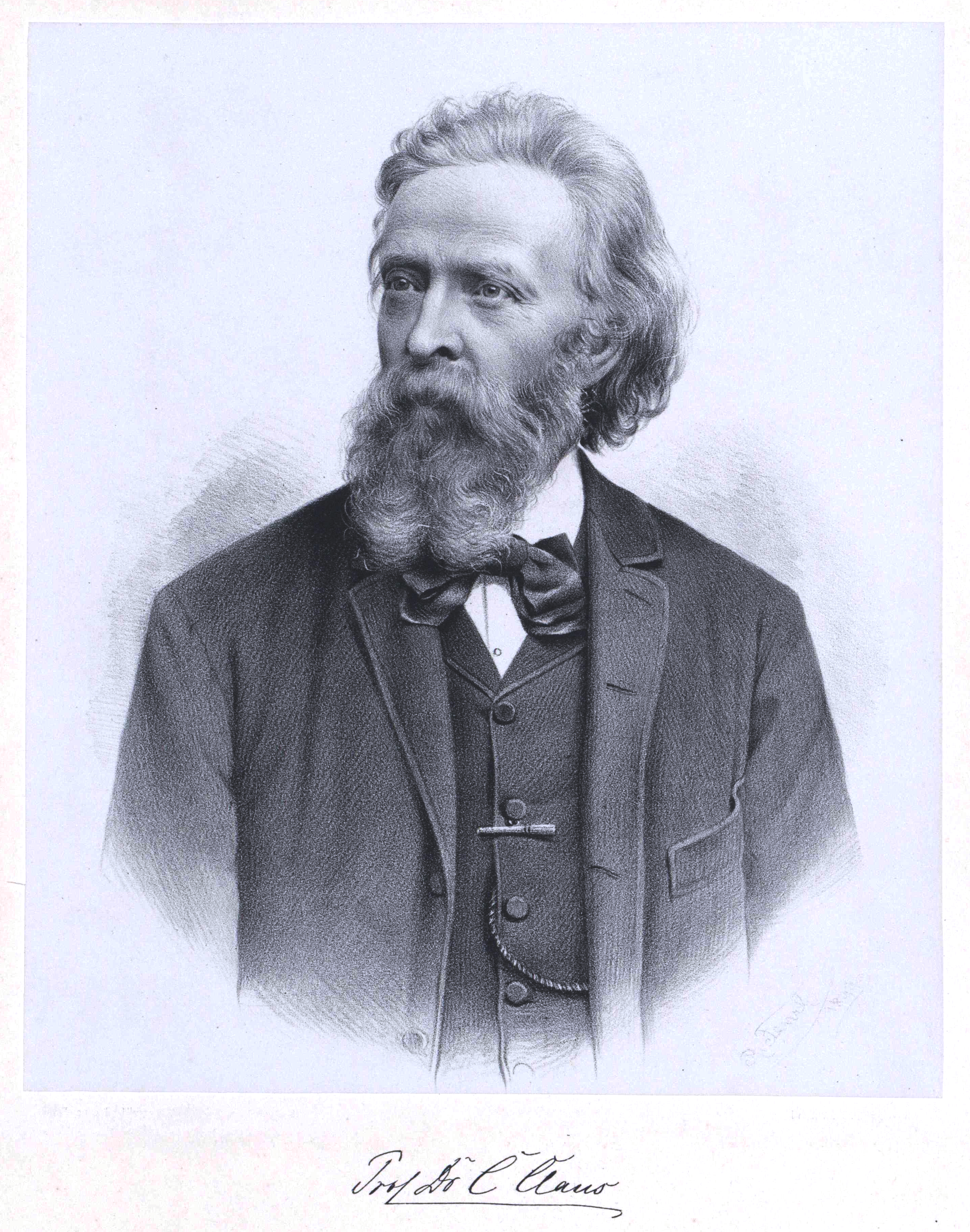
- Born: 2 January 1835; Kassel, Electorate of Hesse, German Confederation
- Died: 18 January 1899 (aged 64); Vienna, Austria-Hungary
- Education: University of Marburg; University of Gießen
- Scientific career
- Fields: Marine zoology
- Workplaces: University of Würzburg; University of Göttingen; University of Vienna
- Doctoral advisor: Rudolf Leuckart
- Author abbrev. (zoology): Claus

Carl Friedrich Wilhelm Claus (2 January 1835 – 18 January 1899) was a German zoologist and anatomist. He was an opponent of the ideas of Ernst Haeckel.

== Biography ==
Claus studied at the University of Marburg and the University of Gießen with Rudolf Leuckart. He worked at the university of Würzburg. In 1863, he became professor of zoölogy at Marburg, in 1870 at Göttingen and in 1873 at Vienna. He was head of the oceanographic research station in Trieste and was specialized on marine zoology and there his interest was focused on crustaceans. During his research on cell biology he coined the word phagocyte.

He is known for the fact that Sigmund Freud started his studies on the yet unsolved eel life history.

== Works ==
Of his numerous works, the following are important:

- Die freilebenden Copepoden (1863);
- Beiträge zur Kenntnis der Ostracoden (1868);
- Grundzüge der Zoölogie (1868) ;
- Ueber den Bau und die Entwicklung der Cumaceen (1870);
- Die Metamorphose der Squilliden (1872);
- Ueber die Entwicklung Organisation und systematische Stellung der Arguliden (1875);
- Lehrbuch der Zoölogie (6th ed., 1897; trans. into English, under the title of Text-book of Zoölogy, by Claus and Sedgwick, London, 1897 ).
