= Procaris chacei =

Conservation status
- Critically Endangered (IUCN 2.3)

Scientific classification
- Kingdom: Animalia
- Phylum: Arthropoda
- Class: Malacostraca
- Order: Decapoda
- Suborder: Pleocyemata
- Family: Procarididae
- Genus: Procaris
- Species: P. chacei

Binomial name
- Procaris chacei Hart & Manning, 1986

Species of crustacean

Procaris chacei is a species of shrimp in the family Procarididae. The genus was first described in 1986 by Charles W. Hart Jr. and Raymond Manning.

It is endemic to Bermuda.
