= Procaris hawaiana =

Scientific classification
- Kingdom: Animalia
- Phylum: Arthropoda
- Class: Malacostraca
- Order: Decapoda
- Suborder: Pleocyemata
- Family: Procarididae
- Genus: Procaris
- Species: P. hawaiana

Binomial name
- Procaris hawaiana Holthuis, 1973

Species of crustacean

Procaris hawaiana is a species of shrimp belonging to the family Procarididae, from Maui, Hawaii. It is very similar to Procaris ascensionis from Ascension Island.
