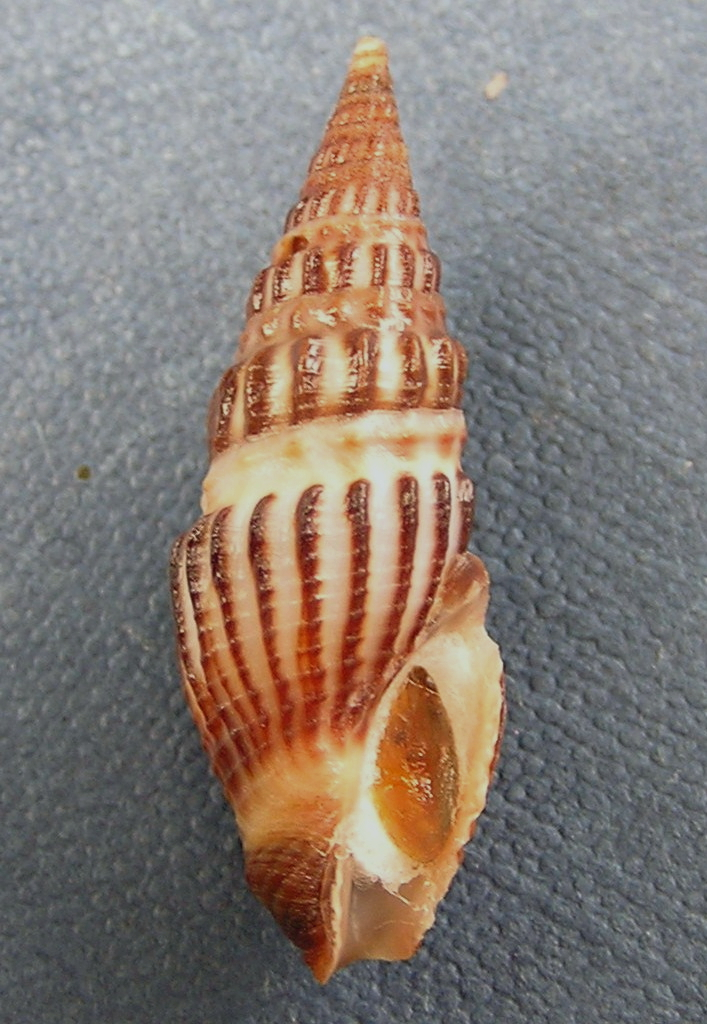
- Apertural view of a shell of Crassispira turricula

Scientific classification
- Kingdom: Animalia
- Phylum: Mollusca
- Class: Gastropoda
- Subclass: Caenogastropoda
- Order: Neogastropoda
- Superfamily: Conoidea
- Family: Pseudomelatomidae
- Genus: Crassispira
- Species: C. turricula

Binomial name
- Crassispira turricula (Sowerby I, 1834)

Synonyms
- Crassispira sowerbyi Reeve, 1843; Crassispira (Crassiclava) turricula (G.B. Sowerby I, 1834); Drillia corrugata (G.B. Sowerby I, 1834); Drillia sowerbyi (Reeve, 1846); Pleurotoma corrugata G.B. Sowerby I, 1834; Pleurotoma sowerbyi Reeve, 1843; Pleurotoma turricula Sowerby I, 1834

= Crassispira turricula =

Species of gastropod

Crassispira turricula, common name the turriculated pleurotoma, is a species of sea snail, a marine gastropod mollusk in the family Pseudomelatomidae.

== Description ==
The length of the shell varies between 21 mm and 45 mm.

(Original description) The brown shell is sharply pyramidal. The upper part of the whorls is tuberculated. The tubercles are arranged in a single row. The lower part of the whorls is longitudinally ribbed, the ribs decussated. The interior of the aperture is blackish purple. The siphonal canal is short.

== Distribution ==
This marine species occurs from Baja California, Mexico to Ecuador.
