= Lancelot Alexander Borradaile =

English zoologist (1872–1945)

Borradaile in 1926

Lancelot Alexander Borradaile (26 September 1872 – 20 October 1945) was an English zoologist, noted for his work on crustaceans and his books The Invertebrata and Manual of Elementary Zoology.

== Biography ==
He was born on 26 September 1872 to a "merchant in the African trade". He studied at Selwyn College, University of Cambridge, on the natural sciences tripos. He graduated with a first-class honours B.A. in 1893; the M.A. followed in 1897. In 1895, he began demonstrating in zoology at Cambridge, and also starting investigating variation in crustaceans, under William Bateson. In 1899, he accompanied John Stanley Gardiner on an expedition to Ceylon (Sri Lanka) and Minikoi (Minicoy), where he studied various aspects of crustacean biology, especially the terrestrial crabs. For his further work on crabs and shrimp, he was awarded the higher doctorate Sc.D. in 1922.

Borradaile became university lecturer in zoology in 1910, later dean of Selwyn College and eventually tutor at that college. He was on the livery of the Drapers' Company and so a freeman of the City of London. He retired in 1937 and died on 20 October 1945.

== Legacy ==
Borradaile may be best known for his undergraduate textbook titled Manual of Elementary Zoology, and for The Invertebrata: a manual for the use of students, co-written with F. A. Potts.

In addition to these generalist works, Borradaile also worked as a carcinologist. He published an important monograph On the Pontoniinae in 1917, based on material collected by the 1905 Percy Sladen Trust Expedition to the Indian Ocean, led by John Stanley Gardiner. He worked extensively on crabs and similar animals, and coined the term "carcinisation" to describe "one of the many attempts of Nature to evolve a crab". He is commemorated in the scientific names Metapenaeopsis borradaili, Athanas borradailei, Corallianassa borradailei, Accalathura borradailei and Petrolisthes borradailei.
