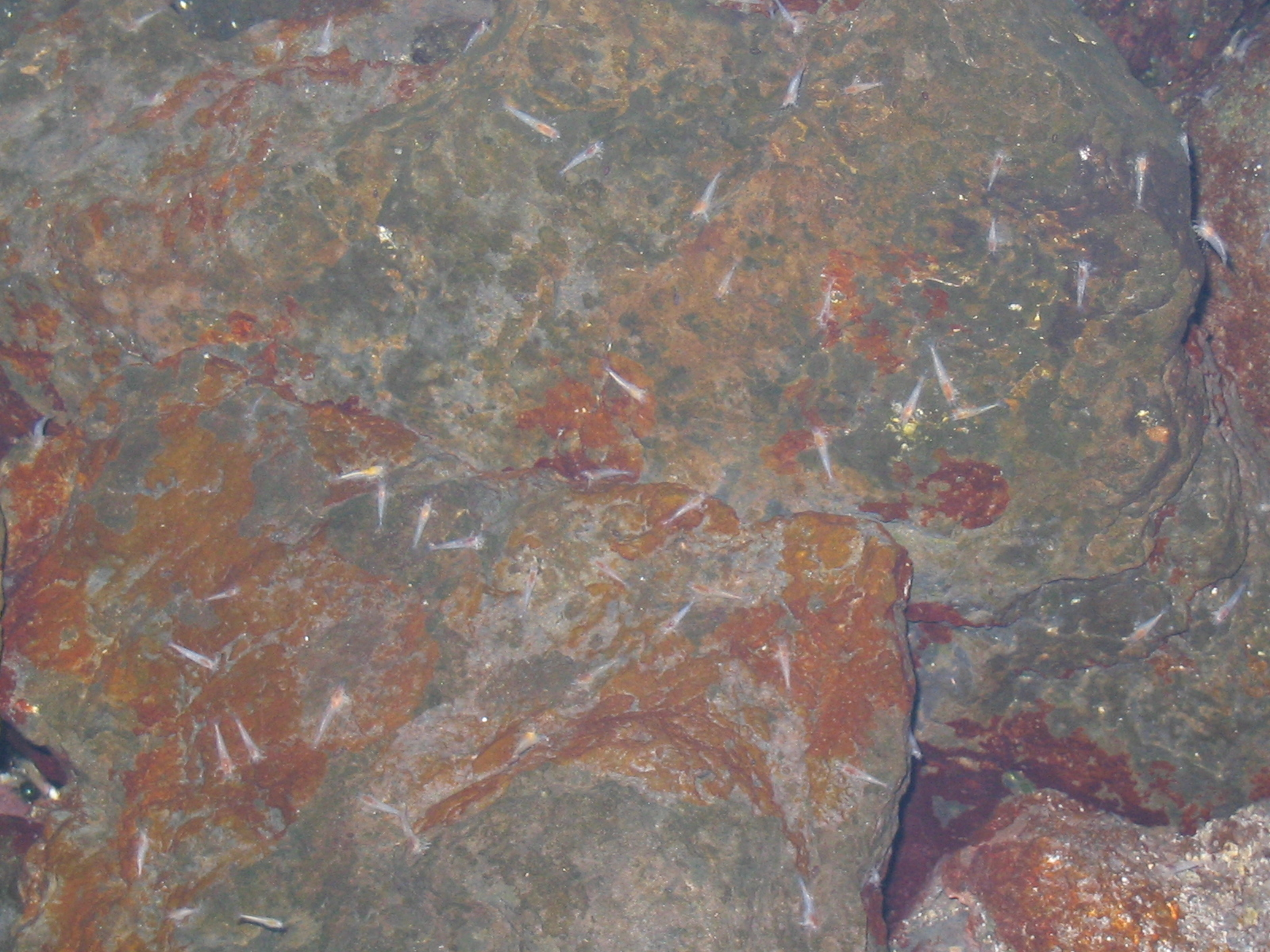

Scientific classification
- Domain: Eukaryota
- Kingdom: Animalia
- Phylum: Arthropoda
- Class: Malacostraca
- Order: Decapoda
- Suborder: Pleocyemata
- Family: Procarididae
- Genus: Procaris
- Species: P. ascensionis

Binomial name
- Procaris ascensionis Chace & Manning, 1972

= Procaris ascensionis =

Species of crustacean

Procaris ascensionis is a species of shrimp, known only from two anchialine pools on Ascension Island; the larger of the two pools is about 4.5 metres (15 ft) in diameter and contains 45 centimetres (18 in) of water.
