= Vetericaris =

Conservation status
- Endangered (ESA)

Scientific classification
- Kingdom: Animalia
- Phylum: Arthropoda
- Class: Malacostraca
- Order: Decapoda
- Suborder: Pleocyemata
- Family: Procarididae
- Genus: Vetericaris; Kensley & Williams, 1986
- Species: V. chaceorum

Binomial name
- Vetericaris chaceorum Kensley & Williams, 1986

Genus of crustaceans

Vetericaris is a genus of procarididean shrimp in the family Procarididae that lives in Hawaiian anchialine pools and contains one species, Vetericaris chaceorum, which was listed as endangered by the U.S. Fish & Wildlife Service in 2013.
