= Barbouriidae =

Scientific classification
- Kingdom: Animalia
- Phylum: Arthropoda
- Clade: Pancrustacea
- Class: Malacostraca
- Order: Decapoda
- Suborder: Pleocyemata
- Infraorder: Caridea
- Superfamily: Alpheoidea
- Family: Barbouriidae; Christoffersen, 1987

Family of crustaceans

Barbouriidae is a family of shrimp, comprising four genera:

- Barbouria Rathbun, 1912
- Calliasmata Holthuis, 1973
- Parhippolyte Borradaile, 1900
- †Tomaricaris Garassino, Pasini & Nazarkin, 2022

== See also ==
- Parhippolyte sterreri
