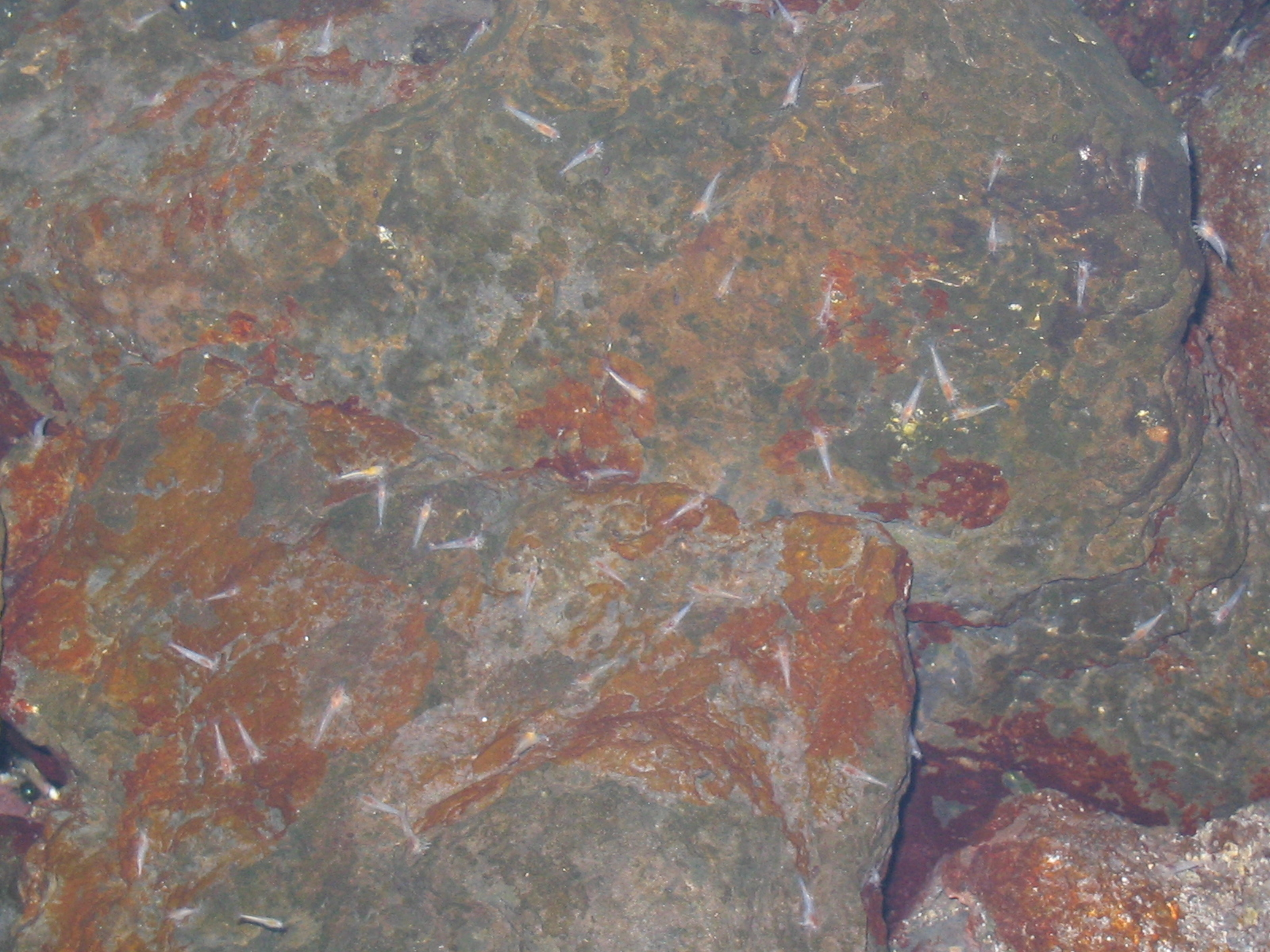
- Procaris ascensionis

Scientific classification
- Kingdom: Animalia
- Phylum: Arthropoda
- Clade: Pancrustacea
- Class: Malacostraca
- Order: Decapoda
- Suborder: Pleocyemata
- Infraorder: Procarididea; Felgenhauer & Abele, 1983

Families and genera
- Procarididae Chace & Manning, 1972; Procaris Chace & Manning, 1972; Vetericaris Kensley & Williams, 1986; †Udora Münster, 1839; †Udorellidae Van Straelen, 1925; †Udorella Oppel, 1862

= Procarididea =

Infraorder of crustaceans

Procarididea is an infraorder of decapods, comprising only thirteen species. Six of these are in the genera Procaris and Vetericaris, which together make up the family Procarididae. The remaining seven species are only known from fossils, one belonging to the genus Udorella (the sole member of the family Udorellidae) and the other six belonging to the genus Udora, which cannot yet be assigned to any family.

The cladogram below shows Procarididea's relationships to other relatives within Decapoda, from analysis by Wolfe et al., 2019.

- Decapoda
  - - Dendrobranchiata (prawns)
  - Pleocyemata
    - - Stenopodidea (boxer shrimp)
      - - Procarididea
        - Caridea ("true" shrimp)
    - Reptantia (crawling / walking decapods)
      - - Achelata (spiny lobsters and slipper lobsters)
        - - Polychelida (benthic crustaceans)
          - Glypheidea (glypheoid lobsters)
          - Astacidea (lobsters and crayfish)
      - - Axiidea (mud shrimp, ghost shrimp, and burrowing shrimp)
        - - Gebiidea (mud lobsters and mud shrimp)
          - - Anomura (hermit crabs and allies)
            - Brachyura ("true" crabs)
