= Agon (disambiguation) =

Agon is an ancient Greek term for a conflict, struggle or contest and also a god. It may also refer to:

== Arts and entertainment ==
- Agon (ballet), a 1957 ballet by George Balanchine with music by Igor Stravinsky
- Agon (game), a board game
- Agon (tokusatsu), a Japanese TV series
- Agon (2012 film), an Albanian film
- Agon (2025 film), a docufiction film
- Agon (band), a Ukrainian pop band
- Agon (comics), a Marvel Comics character
- Agon Kongo, a character in the Eyeshield 21 anime and manga series
- AGON, a series of episodic adventure games for the Mac and PC
- Agon, one of the four elements of play identified by Roger Caillois in his book Man, Play and Games
- Agon, the world in the MMORPG Darkfall
- Agon Wastes, a region in the video game Metroid Prime 2: Echoes

== Business ==
- Agon Limited, a sports event promoting company
- Agon Channel, a former private television station
- Agon (motorcycle), manufactured in Germany between 1924 and 1928
- Agon (newspaper), published in Tirana, Albania

== People ==
- Jean-Paul Agon (born 1956), chairman and former CEO of the cosmetic company L'Oréal
- Agon Elezi (born 2001), Macedonian footballer
- Agon Hamza (born 1984), Kosovan philosopher and political theorist
- Agon Mehmeti (born 1989), Albanian footballer
- Agon Muçolli (born 1998), Danish footballer
- Agon Sadiku (born 2003), Finnish footballer

== Other uses ==
- Agón, a municipality in Aragon, Spain
- Agön, Sweden, an island in the Bothnian Sea
- China-Japan Agon Cup, a Go competition

== See also ==
- Agonist (disambiguation)
- Antagonist (disambiguation)
- Protagonist (disambiguation)
