= Haptosquilla trispinosa =

Scientific classification
- Kingdom: Animalia
- Phylum: Arthropoda
- Clade: Pancrustacea
- Class: Malacostraca
- Order: Stomatopoda
- Family: Protosquillidae
- Genus: Haptosquilla
- Species: H. trispinosa

Binomial name
- Haptosquilla trispinosa (Dana, 1852)

Species of mantis shrimp

Haptosquilla trispinosa is a species of mantis shrimp. This is a smasher species using its raptorial appendages like a club to prey on hard-shelled animals and to defend its burrow. This species is a coral-dwelling crustacean that is common to the Indo-West Pacific tropical waters. H. trispinosa has been found from depths ranging from the low intertidal zone to more than 30 m (100 ft). This animal is relatively small compared to other stomatopods, measuring typically under 35 mm (1.4 in). The females are generally larger than their male counterparts and prefer mating with smaller males. It is believed that mantis shrimp species like H. trispinosa exhibit some of the most sophisticated visual systems in nature. H. trispinosa utilizes its advanced vision for nearly every aspect of life, like mating, hunting and defense.

== Taxonomy ==
H. trispinosa was first described by American zoologist James Dwight Dana in 1852. Initially, H. trispinosa was placed into the genus Gonodactylus but was later moved to the genus Haptosquilla. Members of the genus Haptosquilla have a particular maxilliped arrangement and telson (tail) shape, which is distinguished from other gonodactyloids. Under the family Protosquillidae, H. trispinosa is related to other small-body smasher mantis shrimp that live in small coral reef crevices.

== Description ==
H. trispinosa has a relatively small body size compared to other mantis shrimp, adults measuring at most around 40–50 mm (1.6–2.0 in). This species is a smasher mantis shrimp, as its second pair of thoracic appendages (dactyls) have evolved into calcified clubs that is uses to attack prey. H. trispinosa's appearance is cryptically colored with grey and green allowing it to blend in with coral rubble and algae backgrounds. H. trispinosa contains three spines on the mid-dorsal surface of its telson. This distinctive feature is where the epithet, trispinosa is derived. H. trispinosa's telson is flat and lacks a high median carina. This species also has iridescent blue patches that are located on the inner portion of its first maxillipeds. These patches are used in "meral displays" that are used for interspecies communication to defend its burrow or for mating purposes.

== Distribution and habitat ==
H. trispinosa is distributed across the tropical Western Pacific Ocean. It has been found in waters near Vietnam and the Philippines, southward towards Great Barrier Reef near Australia and eastwards near New Caledonia and the Solomon Islands. H. trispinosa is a benthic species and lives in shallow, intertidal, and sub-tidal waters between 0 and 30 m (0 and 100 ft). This species inhabits pre-existing spaces in coral rubble and limestone crevices for protection, whereas larger mantis shrimp species are known for digging their own burrows. These spaces are essential for the survival of H. trispinosa, as the act like a base for ambush predation and protection during molting phases.

== Behavior ==
=== Courtship and mating ===
The courtship and mating behaviors of H. trispinosa and heavily on visual signals. Females have a mating preference for males that are smaller in size. During the courtship process, a male will cautiously swim to a female and display the "raptorial appendage pumping display". This display, as the name suggests, is where the male will flare off the reflectors located on the first pair of maxillipeds. The maxillipeds display polarized blue light signals that are thought to attract female attention. In the absence of blue reflective regions, males are still able to mate but require a much longer display. Females are also more aggressive to males without the reflectors before courting occurred.

=== Agonistic encounters and aggression ===
In stomatopods like H. trispinosa, aggressive behavior is highly prevalent, rising from competition over limited resources, shelter, and mating. H. trispinosa engages in both interspecific and intraspecific rivalries and will use its club-like raptorial appendages to fight. These aggressive behaviors are in large part facilitated through monoaminergic signaling, with neurotransmitters inducing changes in brain activity. H. trispinosa exhibits a unique phenomenon in which it has increased whole-brain concentrations of serotonin, octopamine, and dopamine associated with a subordinate losing state rather than a more aggressive or dominant state.

=== Cognition and learning ===
H. trispinosa possesses the cognitive capacity to recognize shapes and exhibits associative learning. Stomatopods have apposition compound eyes that contain many different photoreceptor types that allow H. trispinosa to accurately discriminate between different objects, such as a square from a circle. H. trispinosa was also found to be able to learn to distinguish these shapes with greater accuracy over a 30-day period, demonstrating its capability of test-learning.

== Vision processes ==
=== Tunable color vision ===
Most mantis shrimp species can be found at a variety of narrow depth ranges. Since the range of depth is relatively constant between members of the same species, the light at these depths is also relatively consistent. Because the light is consistent, many stomatopods of the same species have similar photoreceptor characteristic in their eyes. H. trispinosa conversely can be found between a relatively large range of depths of nearly subtidal to more than 30 meters. Since the characteristics of light very highly between subtidal to more than 30 meters, similarly behaving photoreceptors would not be able to function at both depths. Adaptation has allowed H. trispinosa to tune their color vision to meet the requirements imposed by their environment. The spectral sensitivity of H. trispinosa is tuned by transparent filters that are directly in front of four different classes of photoreceptors. Each filter class contains a spectral maximum corresponding to yellow at 508 nanometers, orange at 537 nanometers, red at 539 nanometers and blue at 558 nanometers. Populations of H. trispinosa at depths of 1 meter and 15 meters contain identical visual pigments. In animals that live in deeper waters, the long-wavelength receptors are shifted toward shorter wavelengths. The light conditions of these animals in their post-larval stages dictate the phenotypic differences of light sensitivity which suggests phenotypic plasticity. Post-larval H. trispinosa that developed under wavelengths lacking blue light longer than 550 nanometers successfully develop characteristically deep-water population filters. Post-larvae that are raised under broad-spectrum white light retain filters that are characteristic of shallow-living adults. Even though 96% of illumination longer than 575 nanometers is reduced in deep-waters, tuning of the 15-meter animals allows them to capture incident photons at 75% of the rate of the surface dwellers.

=== Polarization vision ===
H. trispinosa, like many marine animals, are able to perceive polarized light in order to more clearly visualize objects in shallow coastal areas, where conditions like the time of day and the turbidity of water can affect the clarity and coloration of visual stimuli. Crustaceans like H. trispinosa also utilize polarization signals to detect prey and to communicate with conspecifics. H. trispinosa has shown a significantly greater likelihood towards responding to horizontally polarized stimuli when compared to vertically polarized stimuli. H. trispinosa was able to discriminate between two different angles of polarization through a threshold between 21.4 and 30 degrees. This discrimination works as a low-pass filter that improves the signal-to-noise ratio against natural variations in background. The blue polarization reflectors on their maxillipeds contain small vesicles that function as polarization beam splitters. These vesicles reflect highly polarized light so the rest of the wavelengths can be transmitted.

=== Ultraviolet vision ===
H. trispinosa is also able to process visual information through the ultraviolet spectrum. The midband of the H. trispinosa's eyes contain up to five different types of ultraviolet photoreceptors. These photoreceptors are able to detect wavelength ranges below 400 nanometers. H. trispinosa also have three spectral class of UV-sensitive photoreceptors. In a binary trained choice assay, H. trispinosa was able to decipher UVA light that peaked at 379.1 nanometers and UVB light that peaked at 317.4 nanometers. H. trispinosa also displayed an aversion to burrows emitting UVB light. This may suggest that UVB stimuli could be treated as a warning cue.
