= Vilan (disambiguation) =

Vilan is a mountain in the Alps.

Vilan may also refer to:

== People ==
- Avshalom Vilan (born 1951), Israeli politician
- Mayte Vilán (born 1970), Cuban actress

== Other uses ==
- Cape Vilan, peninsula in Spain

== See also ==
- Villain (disambiguation)
- Villon (disambiguation)
- VLAN
- Vylan
