= Villain (disambiguation) =

A villain is an evil person or fictional character.

Villain(s) or The Villain(s) may also refer to:

== Books ==
- Villain, a 1971 novel by James Barlow
- Villain (Akunin 悪人), a 2010 novel by Shuichi Yoshida
- Villain, a 2009 poetry collection by Justin Clemens
- Villains, a comic book published by Viper Comics

== Film and television ==
=== Film ===
- The Villain (1917 film), starring Oliver Hardy
- Villain (1971 film), a British gangster film
- The Villain (1979 film), a sendup of Westerns, starring Kirk Douglas
- Khal Nayak or The Villain, a 1993 Indian film by Subhash Ghai starring Sanjay Dutt
- Villain (2002 film), an Indian Tamil film directed by K. S. Ravikumar starring Ajith Kumar
- Villain (2003 film), an Indian Telugu film directed by K. S. Ravikumar starring Rajasekhar
- The Villain (2009 film), a French film
- Villain (2010 film) (Akunin), a Japanese film directed by Lee Sang-il
- Villain, the Telugu-dubbed version of Raavanan, a 2010 Indian film
- Villain (2012 film), an Indian Kannada film
- Villain (2013 film), a Bengali film
- Ek Villain, a 2014 Indian Hindi film
- Villain (2017 film), an Indian Malayalam film
- The Villainess, a 2017 Korean film
- The Villain (2018 film), an Indian Kannada film
- Villains (film), a 2019 comedy horror film
- Villain (2020 film), a British film starring Craig Fairbrass
- Villain, a 2023 short film starring Bella Ramsey
- Villain (2024 film), a Sri Lankan Sinhalese-language film

=== Television ===
- Villains (British TV series), a 1972 crime drama
- Villains (South Korean TV series), a 2025 crime drama
- "Villains" (Buffy the Vampire Slayer), a 2002 episode of Buffy the Vampire Slayer
- "Villains" (Heroes), a 2008 third-season episode of Heroes
- Villains, the third volume of the TV series Heroes, comprising 13 episodes of season 3

== Music ==
- Villains (electronic music group), an American DJ/producer duo

=== Albums ===
- The Villain (album), by Trick Trick, 2008
- Villain (album), by Attila, 2019
- Villains (Emma Blackery album), 2018
- Villains (Queens of the Stone Age album), 2017
- Villains (Stray from the Path album), 2008
- Villains (The Verve Pipe album), 1996
- Villains (Wolfgang album), 2008
- Villains? (album), by The Saw Doctors, 2002
- Vilã, by Ludmilla, 2023

=== Songs ===
- "Villain", by Ado from Ado's Utattemita Album, 2023
- "Villain", by Bella Poarch from Dolls, 2022
- "Villain", by Deafheaven from Infinite Granite, 2021
- "Villain", by Girls' Generation from Forever 1, 2022
- "Villain", by Hedley from Hedley, 2005
- "Villain", by Jennifer Lopez from Love?, 2011
- "Villain", by K/DA from All Out, 2020
- "Villain", by Maisie Peters from You Signed Up For This, 2023
- "Villain", by Slayyyter from Troubled Paradise, 2021
- "Villain", by Speedy Ortiz from Twerp Verse, 2018
- "Villain", by Stella Jang from Stella I, 2020
- "Villain", by Theory of a Deadman from The Truth Is..., 2001
- "Villain", by YoungBoy Never Broke Again from Until Death Call My Name, 2018

== People ==
- Evan Turner (born 1988), American basketball player, nicknamed "The Villain"
- François-Xavier Villain (1950–2025), French politician
- Jacques Villain (1934–2022), French physicist
- Jean-Paul Villain (born 1946), French long-distance steeplechase runner
- Marty Scurll (born 1988), English professional wrestler, nicknamed "The Villain"
- Raoul Villain (1885–1936), French nationalist and assassin of Jean Jaurès
- Rose Villain (born 1989), Italian singer-songwriter and rapper

== Other uses ==
- Villain (roller coaster), a defunct wooden roller coaster at Geauga Lake in Aurora, Ohio
- Villains (James Bond 007), a 1986 supplement for the role-playing game James Bond 007
- Villein or villain, a type of serf in the Middle Ages

== See also ==
- Vilan (disambiguation)
- Villaine (disambiguation)
- Villainy (disambiguation)
- Villano (disambiguation)
- Villon (disambiguation)
- VLAN
- Vylan
- Aston Villa F.C., nicknamed "The Villans", an English football club
- The Opponent (disambiguation)
- Antagonist (disambiguation)
