= Akunin =

Akunin may refer to:

- Boris Akunin, pen name of a Georgian-Russian writer Grigory Shalvovich Chkhartishvili (born 1956)
- Kakushi Toride no San-Akunin: The Last Princess, a 2008 Japanese film
- Akunin (film), a 2010 Japanese crime noir film

== See also ==
- Villain (disambiguation)
