= Antagonism =

Antagonism may refer to:

- The characteristic of an antagonist
- Antagonism (chemistry), where the involvement of multiple agents reduces their overall effect
- Drug antagonism, a drug that stops the action or effect of another substance, preventing a biological response
  - Receptor antagonism or pharmacological antagonism, the action of a drug that inhibits the function of an agonist at the level of a receptor
- Antagonism (phytopathology), an effect that suppresses the activity of a plant pathogen
- Reflexive antagonism of muscles
- Intraspecific antagonism, disharmonious or antagonistic interaction between two individuals of the same species

== See also ==
- Antagonist (disambiguation)
