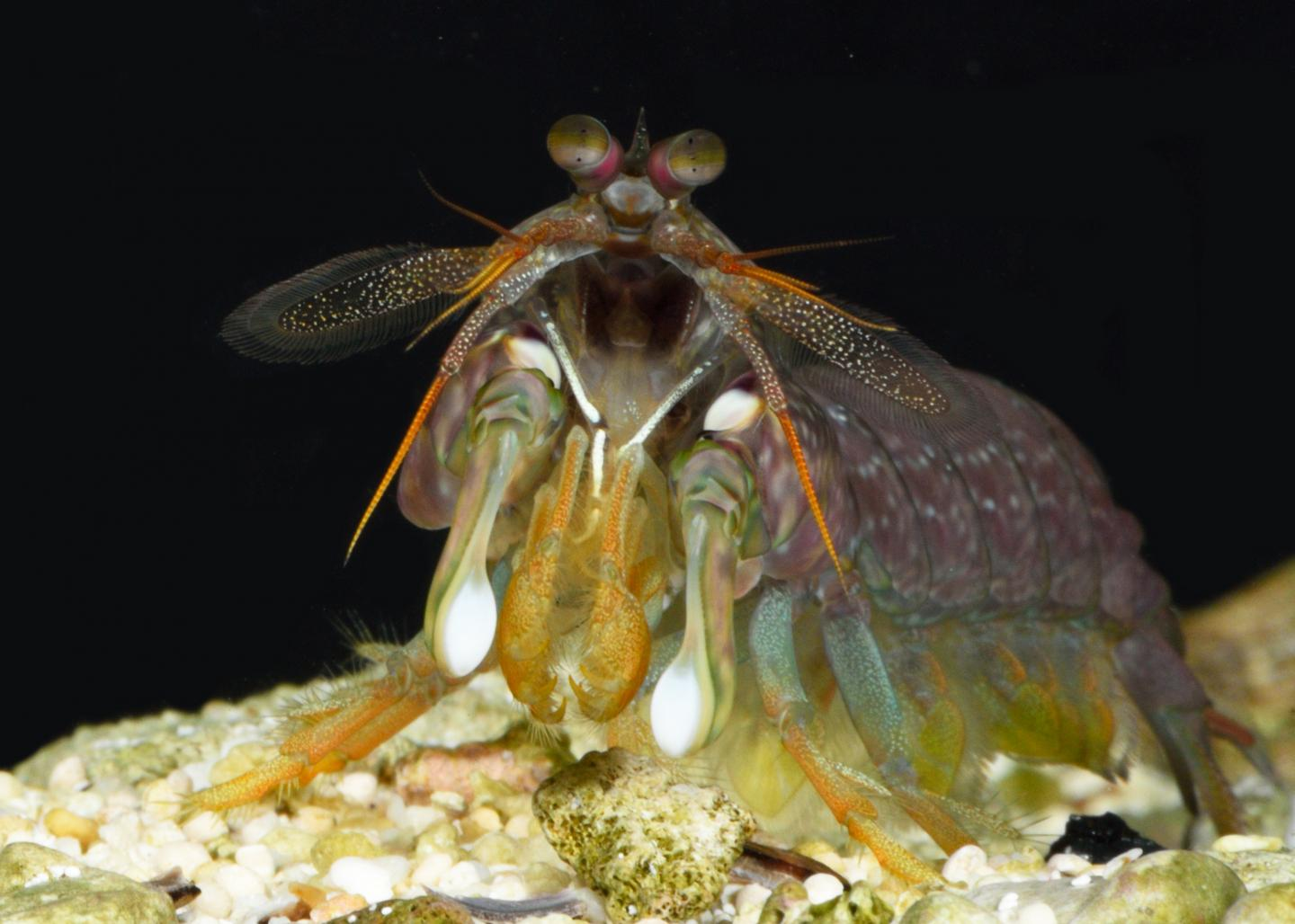

Scientific classification
- Kingdom: Animalia
- Phylum: Arthropoda
- Clade: Pancrustacea
- Class: Malacostraca
- Order: Stomatopoda
- Family: Gonodactylidae
- Genus: Neogonodactylus
- Species: N. bredini

Binomial name
- Neogonodactylus bredini (Manning, 1969)

Synonyms
- Gonodactylus bredini

= Neogonodactylus bredini =

Species of crustacean

Neogonodactylus bredini, commonly known as the split-thumb mantis shrimp, is a stomatopod native to tropical parts of the western Atlantic. It lives in the littoral zone and prefers shallow waters, most common in depths up to 15 meters. N. bredini thrive among sponges, corals, and rocks on the ocean floor. Like other stomatopods, it has large, powerful raptorial claws that it uses to fight other stomatopods and break the shells of prey.

N. bredini lives in rocky crevices and cavities, a highly contested resource on the ocean floor. It has complex social behaviors, able to recognize other individuals of its species, and will often participate in aggressive contests with them over control of territory. Its enlarged raptorial claws have blunt edges, putting it under the smasher class of mantis shrimp, and they make it a skilled fighter and hunter that opportunistically preys on hard- and soft-shelled prey.

== Appearance ==
Neogonodactylus bredini is usually light green in color, although it can range between reddish, darker green, and blue. Their walking legs are yellow or orange, and their dactyls are usually pink. Like other smashing type mantis shrimp, its raptorial claws have a blunt, swollen base for smashing hard-shelled prey. Males grow to about 70mm in size, females to 75mm. N. bredini can be distinguished from the similar Neogonodactylus lacunatus by a lack of channeled grooves along its carapace, which are observed in N. lacunatus.

== Ecology ==
=== Geographic range ===
Neogonodactylus bredini is native to tropical parts of the western Atlantic. It is found around the Gulf of Mexico and the Caribbean Sea around coastal areas, from the southern edge of the Bermudas and the Carolinas to the northern parts of Curaçao and Bon-Aire.

=== Habitat ===
Neogonodactylus bredini lives in rock cavities in shallow waters on the ocean floor. It is typically solitary, although a male and female may coexist as a mating pair in the period between initial breeding and oviposition. It prefers to inhabit larger cavities with multiple entrances, but will use smaller ones in cases of scarcity. Extra entrances may be plugged up with debris or remain open and monitored, where the individual switches between entrances in order to guard them. The animal will use its maxillae and raptorial claws to clean or excavate the chamber and shovel any debris outside. Entrances will be filled with pieces of random debris such as shell or stone, and gaps in the barricade will be filled in with mud or algae. The opening and closing of entrances follows a daily cycle, where entrances will be opened during daylight and closed at night.

=== Diet ===
Neogonodactylus bredini is a generalist predator, preying on soft-bodied and hard-bodied animals opportunistically. It will eat worms, fish, shrimp, crabs, and whatever prey is readily available in its habitat. Like other smasher-type stomatopods, it hunts hard-shelled prey, like snails and crabs, by smashing them with the blunt edge of its raptorial claw. However, N. bredini will strike soft- and hard-bodied prey alike. It can travel up to 2 meters away from its cavity to hunt, going on upwards of 10 hunts a day and bringing prey back to its cavity to eat. N. bredini is capable of learning from its prey and will strategically target weak spots or seams on shells. If a single blow does not break a shell, an individual may experimentally strike a shell many times to test the effectiveness of specific strike locations. It will strike differently shaped shells in different places in order to break them open with the least effort.

== Behavior ==
=== Territoriality ===
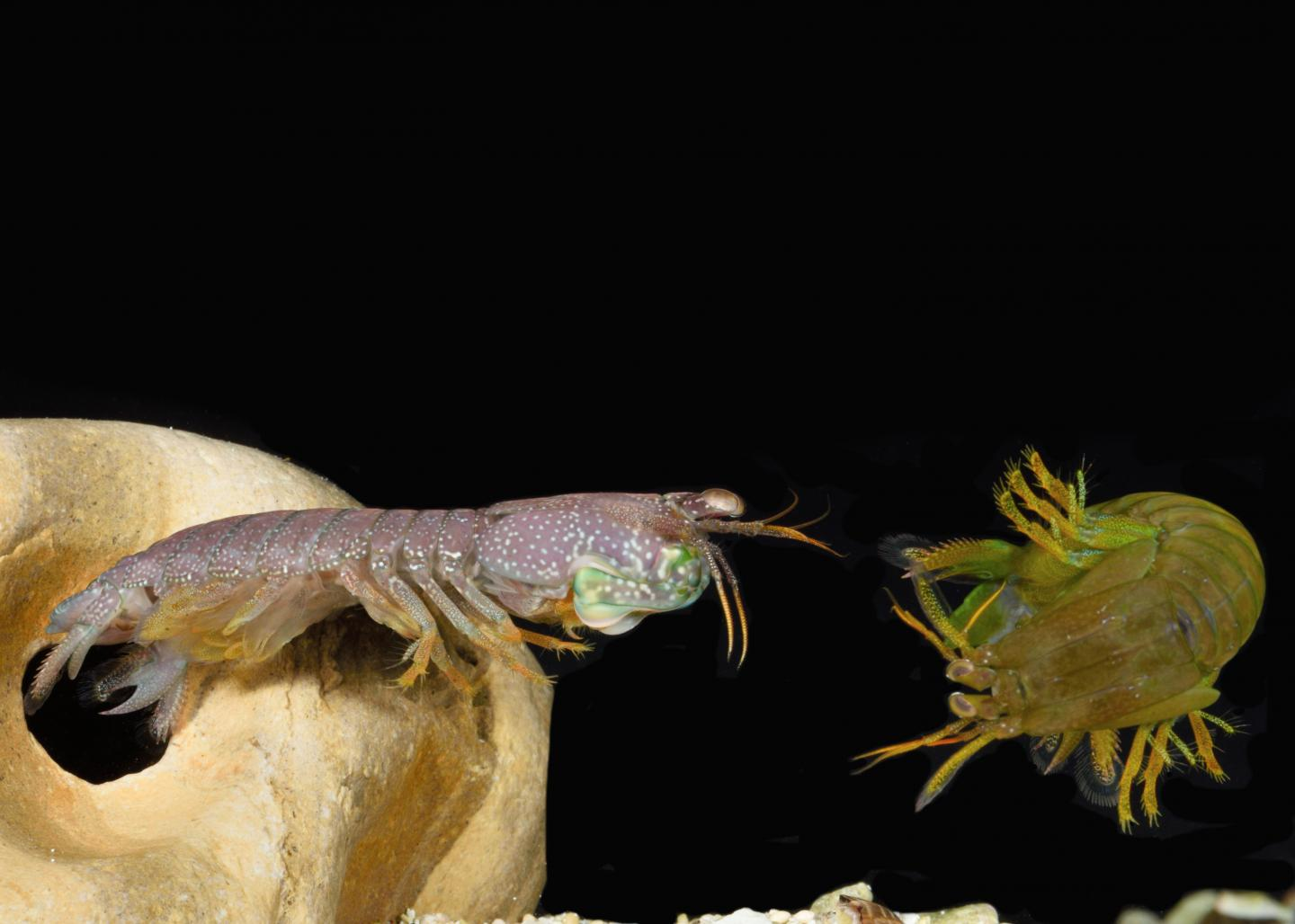
Two N. bredini sparring

Neogonodactylus bredini is a highly territorial animal. Individuals will find enclosed cavities and station themselves in the entrance with their head protruding, defending the entrances against any intruders. Approaching stomatopods will be met with aggression and a meral spread, a display in which the animal spreads its claws and shows off the prominent spots on them. The defender is usually able to successfully defend its territory, with successful evictions mostly occurring in cases of clear dominance; the attacker is significant larger than the defender, the defender is molting and vulnerable. Even in such cases, eviction does not occur without some direct aggressive encounter. The defending N. bredini will not leave only because of the approach or displays of a larger individual.

Cavities are a highly contested resource, both by stomatopods and other animals. Octopus joubini is a common competitor for suitable cavities. N. bredini will fight and consume smaller octopuses when they approach, but larger ones are a significant threat. While N. bredini does not instinctually avoid chemical signals emitted by the octopus, after one or multiple encounters it will recognize the scent and grow cautious, avoiding cavities they know to be occupied.

=== Parental care ===
After successful courtship and mating, a male and female pair may settle in a cavity together, which they mutually defend from predators and other stomatopods. Soon after the eggs are laid, often within 24 hours, the female becomes aggressive and drives the male out. She remains with the eggs, defending the chamber and keeping the eggs clean by palpating and turning them over in her maxillipeds. The female does not abandon the chamber until the larvae molt into the fourth stage, at which point both larvae and the female exit. When a chamber in which to keep eggs is not readily available, the female may build or dig one herself using her maxillipeds.

=== Aggression ===
Neogonodactylus bredini is markedly aggressive and will attack any members of its species that range too close. Aggressive encounters are signaled by a quick approach and threat display; raising its cephalothorax, flicking its antennae in a distinctive back-and-forth towards the other. This is followed by a meral spread, in which the animal raises its maxillipedes to display its meral spots, conspicuous white and black dots on the insides of its claws. Meral spreads are used to warn off opponents or predators, but they are not typically enough to end an encounter. They are used as precursors to combat rather than a method of resolution. The size of a meral spread is not a good predictor of the victor of a fight between similarly sized opponents, nor is the force of blows. Rather, the winner is usually the individual able to throw and land more blows.

After the approach, attacks may be exchanged. Blows are made with the raptorial claws and involve forcefully smashing the enlarged end of the dactyl against the opponent. Battles almost never end in significant injury, and when two N. bredini are similarly sized and equally matched, they will strike non-lethally at the opponent's telson in order to avoid fatal risk until they or the opponent surrender. Dominant individuals are more likely to initiate and continue aggressive exchanges, while subordinates will be more likely to avoid encounters. If a subordinate is losing a battle or in close quarters with a known stronger individual, the subordinate will go motionless and assume a humped, defensive position. Larger N. bredini are usually more aggressive than smaller ones. After molting an individual will be non-aggressive and avoid combat for 7-9 days until their shell hardens and they are able to participate in battle again without significant risk of injury. When defending territory, a freshly molted individual will attempt to bluff with meral spreads in order to dissuade the invader. This tactic works best against smaller opponents, but an individual will attempt to bluff larger opponents as well even though they will be unable to defend themself if combat is initiated by the intruder.

Neogonodactylus bredini is capable of recognizing specific other individuals of its species, and will respond according to their history. An individual who has previously lost a contest with another is likely to avoid or submit to the winner. Contests generally escalate from visual recognition, when the two individuals make eye contact, to display behaviors, like antennular flicking and meral spreads, into active aggression, such as lunges, strikes, or telson coils, where the animal rolls into a ball, pulling its telson up near its head. Individual animals are capable of scaling the power behind their strikes and tend to strike larger opponents harder than smaller ones.

== Life cycle ==
Egg masses consist of 800-900 eggs, each less than a millimeter in diameter. The development of the larvae consists of seven stages, three propelagic and four pelagic. During their first three stages, the larvae have underdeveloped mouthparts and will remain in the burrow, guarded by their mother, eating their egg yolk. In the fourth stage, they leave the burrow and begin hunting and eating prey. The time for the larvae to develop fully averages around 30-40 days, but will take longer in colder waters and shorter in warmer waters.

== Mating ==
Sexually mature female Neogonodactylus bredini develop swollen ovaries and hepatopancreas, which are visible as darkened, orange sections in the telson. N. bredini mating rituals can be initiated by either the male or female. When the male initiates, he spreads his claws before her multiple times and swims over her in a mating display before clasping her at the telson and beginning to mate. If the female is unwilling to mate, she will remain territorial and attack any individuals that approach her. When the female initiates, she pushes beneath the male, compelling him to grasp her. If both partners are receptive, there will be little to no aggressive displays or aggression during mating.

After mating, the paired N. bredini will guard a cavity together until the female lays her eggs. Females remain willing to mate with any extrapair males that approach, and paired males will fight more aggressively to prevent other potential matches. Males are unlikely to seek out extrapair mating.

== Anatomy ==
N. bredini has similar physiology to other stomatopods. Its carapace covers most of the front of its body, followed by four thoracic segments, six abdominal segments, and the telson, the end of its tail. It has five pairs of maxillipedes, the second pair being the enlarged raptorial claws, and three pairs of walking legs behind them. Males have visible copulatory tubes directly behind the last pair of walking legs. The gills are on the pleopods, which are beneath the first five abdominal segments.

=== Vision ===
Like other mantis shrimp, N. bredini has complex color vision that can see a wide range of wavelengths of both visible light and ultraviolet. Its range of vision is tuned specifically for its preferred depth range, and N. bredini can adjust their vision to see better in different ranges of wavelengths.

== Interactions with humans ==
Neogonodactylus bredini is not easily kept as an aquarium animal. Its aggression means it must be housed alone, and it will prey on any animals housed with it that are small enough for it to eat. Additionally, the force of its strike means it can break the glass of an aquarium.

== Taxonomy ==
Raymond B. Manning first described the split-thumb mantis shrimp as Gonodactylus bredini in 1969. He reclassified it as Neogonodactylus bredini in 1995, separating Neogonodactylus from Gonodactylus by the presence of an additional carina on its telson. In 1997, Neogonodactylus wennerae was separated from N. bredini based on minor physical differences and differing depth ranges.
