= Agonist (disambiguation) =

Agonist (from Ancient Greek ἀγωνιστής: agōnistēs, “combatant, champion”) may refer to:

- A person engaged in a contest or struggle (see agon)
- An advocate of the political theory of agonism (or "agonistic pluralism")
- Agonist, a substance that binds to a receptor to induce a biochemical response
  - Inverse agonist, a substance that induces the opposite effect of an agonist
- Agonist (muscle), a muscle type
- The Agonist, a Canadian metal band
- Agonistic behaviour, animal behaviour relating to conflict

== See also ==
- The dictionary definition of ἀγωνιστής at Wiktionary
- Agonistes (fictional character), a fictional demon from the videogame Tortured Souls
- Samson Agonistes, a tragic closet drama John Milton
- Sweeney Agonistes, a verse drama by T.S. Eliot
- Agonist-antagonist (pharmacology)
- Combatant
- Agon (disambiguation)
- Antagonist (disambiguation)
- Protagonist (disambiguation)
- Champion (disambiguation)
