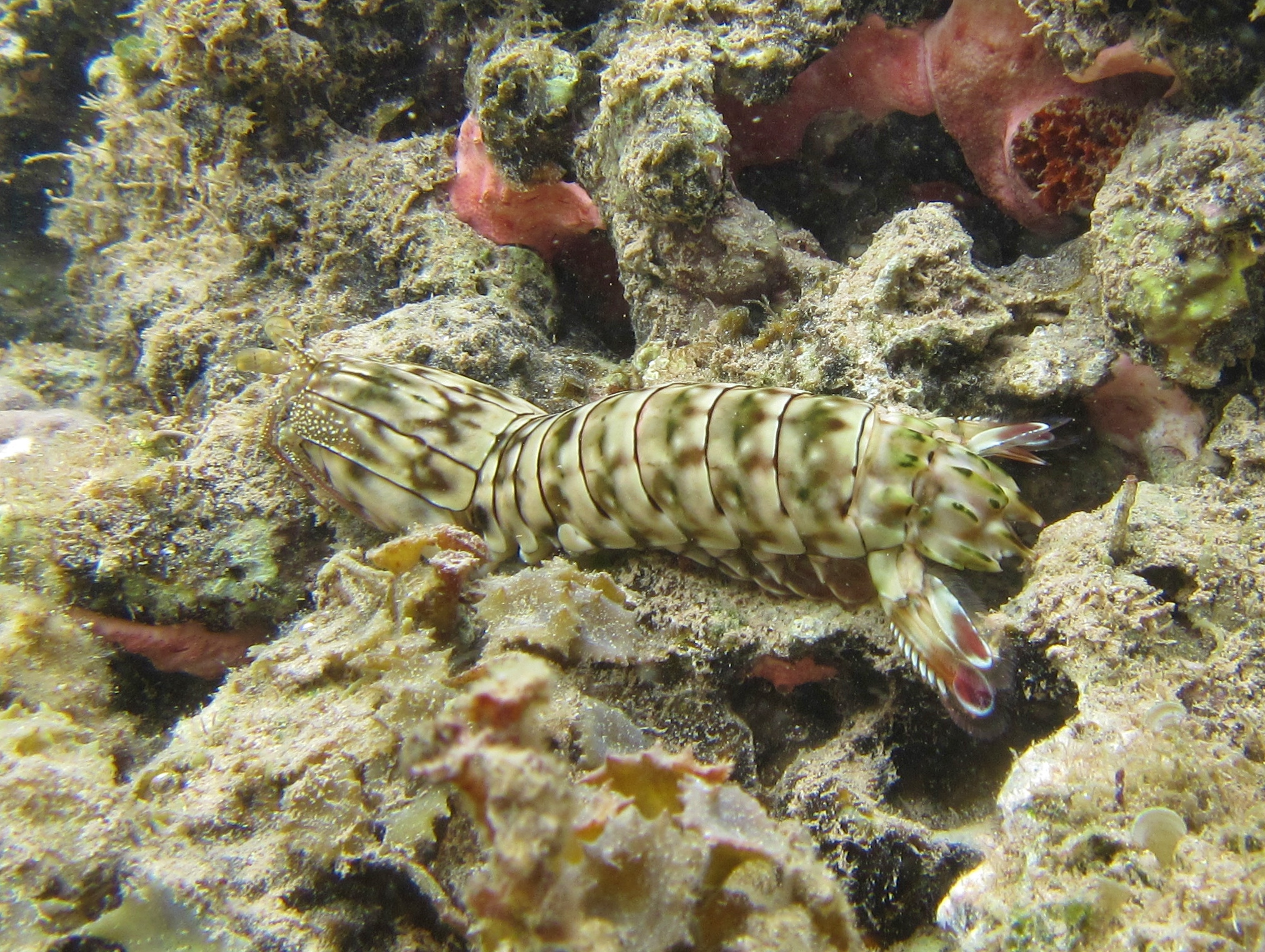

Scientific classification
- Domain: Eukaryota
- Kingdom: Animalia
- Phylum: Arthropoda
- Class: Malacostraca
- Order: Stomatopoda
- Family: Gonodactylidae
- Genus: Gonodactylus
- Species: G. chiragra

Binomial name
- Gonodactylus chiragra (Fabricius, 1781)

Synonyms
- Squilla chiragra Fabricius, 1781

= Gonodactylus chiragra =

Species of crustacean

Gonodactylus chiragra, also known as the clubfoot mantis shrimp, is a medium to large mantis shrimp that is distributed widely throughout the West Indo-Pacific.

== Taxonomy ==
The synonymy of G. chiragra remains unclear because all members of Gonodactylus have been confused with G. chiragra at some point. This species also displays a large amount of variation, which has made classification even more difficult. Newer research by Manning has resulted in the discovery of several new species that were previously thought to be G. chiragra.

== Description ==
The species typically grows to a maximum length of 105 millimetres and is sexually dimorphic. Males range in color from brown to a dark green, and females from a grey/green to white.

=== Claws ===
All mantis shrimp (stomatopods) are either spearers or smashers. G. chiragra is a smasher, which means that the heel on their second pair of thoracic appendages is greatly enlarged, forming a club that is used to smash prey. When a target is spotted, G. chiragra strike powerfully and quickly in one of the quickest punches in all of nature. Common targets for eating are snails, hermit crabs, and clams, but bigger animals are sometimes targeted such as mollusks and other crustaceans. G. chiragra are one of the largest smashers and employ a unique fighting strategy in which they circle around the target and aim at the head. This is thought to have developed as a result of intense competition for suitable burrows among stomatopods.

The species is considered one of the most aggressive species of mantis shrimp and when in captivity, routinely strike glass walls and air tubes in the aquarium.

=== Eyes ===
Seeing underwater is very different because in the ambient light there is strong spectral variations that affect color vision. The eyes of G. chiragra are some of the most unique in all of the animal world because they are sensitive to linear polarization. Living underwater, this provides many benefits to them including increased contrast enhancement, ability to see polarization reflecting prey, and better navigation among the light-scattered ocean environment.

The eyes themselves are large stalked apposition compound eyes and have two defining features that affect their complexity. First is their rotational ability; the eyes move completely independent of each other and one eye only is enough for catching prey. Second is the presence of a midband, a large strip of specialized ommatidia (clusters of photoreceptor cells) that divides each eye equally into two segments. The midband contains specialized polarization receptors in rows five and six. In row 2D, photoreceptors have unidirectional microvilli, which makes them sensitive to linear polarized light. The midband is also responsible for binocular distant vision.

Although their eyes are incredibly complex among animals, G. chiragra are one of the few species of mantis shrimp that do not have polarized body markings. This offers them one less form of communication, and it is thought that evolution of deadly weapons (see "Claws" above) was preferred to body signals because of their restricted habitat.

== Distribution and habitat ==
The species is widely distributed in the western Indo-Pacific. It occurs in shallow water in the upper intertidal zone around boulders and coral heads where prey is available. G. chiragra are burrowers, but usually do not construct their own shelters. Instead, they inhibit rocky cavities that are either natural or created by other animals such as mollusks. However, they are equipped to erode the material of the burrow so that it perfectly fits their body shape. Burrows serve many purposes, including protection, lookouts for finding prey, consuming prey, mating, and keeping eggs safe. G. chiragra are active during the day and often close off the entrance to their shelter at night using bits of sand and rocks.
