= Villainy =

Villainy may refer to:

- the activities or character of a villain
- Villainy (band), an alternative rock band from New Zealand
- Villainy Inc., fictional characters who battle Wonder Woman
- "Villainy", a song by Local Natives from the 2016 album Sunlit Youth

== See also ==
- Villain (disambiguation)
- Villainy & Virtue, a 2004 album by Dead to Fall
