= Kathanayakudu =

Kathanayakudu (lit. 'protagonist') may refer to:

- Kathanayakudu (1969 film), Indian Telugu-language film
- Kathanayakudu (1984 film), Indian Telugu-language film
- Kathanayakudu (2008 film), Indian Telugu-language film
- NTR: Kathanayakudu, 2019 Indian Telugu-language film

== See also ==
- Katha Nayagan (disambiguation)
- Protagonist (disambiguation)
- Kathanayaka, a 1986 Indian film
- Kathanayaki, a 1955 Indian film
- Katha Nayakan, a 1997 Indian film
