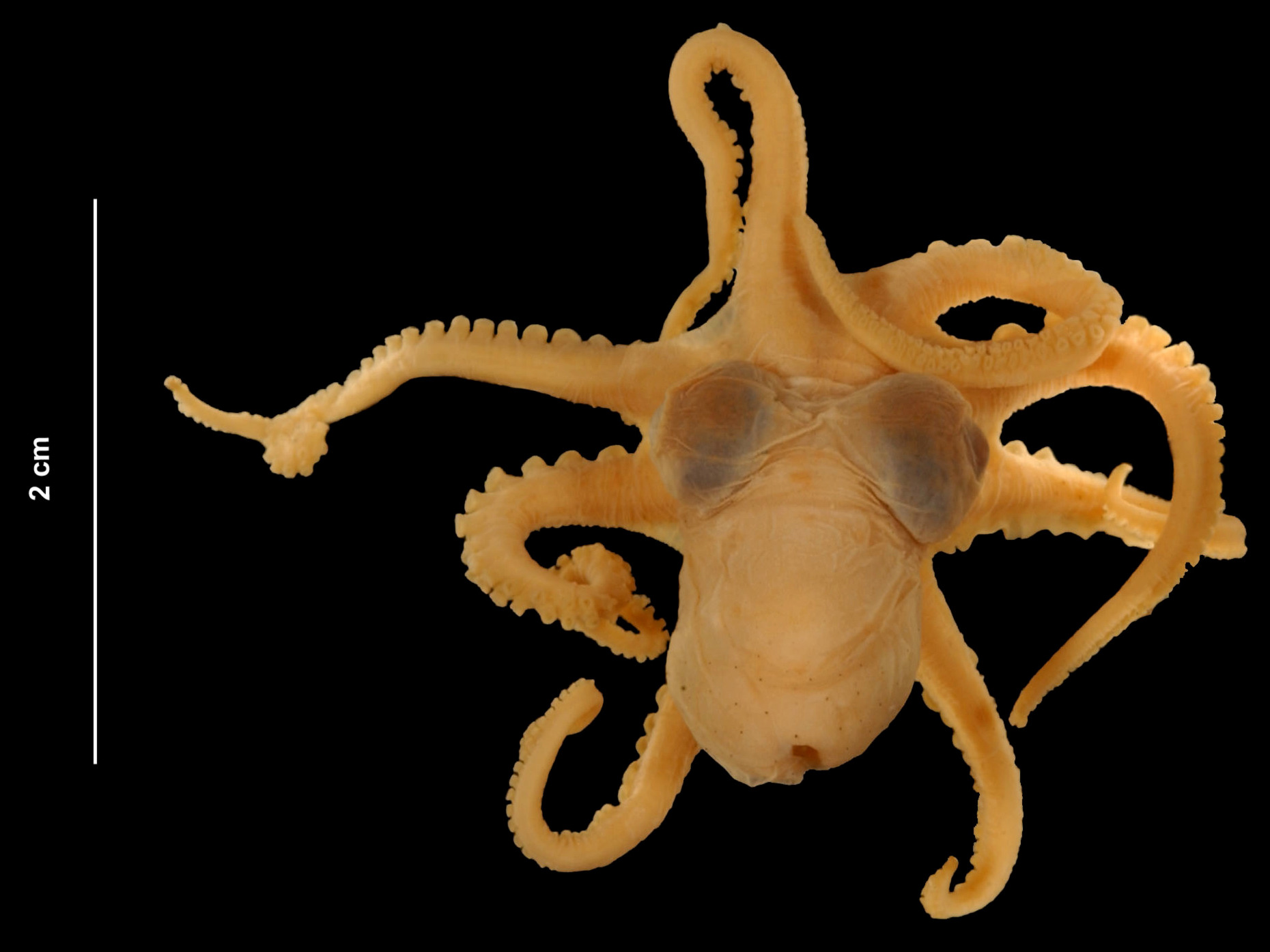

Conservation status
- Least Concern (IUCN 3.1)

- Secure (NatureServe)

Scientific classification
- Kingdom: Animalia
- Phylum: Mollusca
- Class: Cephalopoda
- Order: Octopoda
- Family: Octopodidae
- Genus: Octopus
- Species: O. joubini

Binomial name
- Octopus joubini Robson, 1925

= Atlantic pygmy octopus =

Species of cephalopod

The Atlantic pygmy octopus (Octopus joubini), also known as the small-egg Caribbean pygmy octopus, is a small species of octopus in the order Octopoda. Fully grown, this cephalopod reaches a mantle length of 4.5 cm (1.8 inches) with arms up to 9 cm (3.5 inches) long. They are known for being intelligent creatures with keen senses, particularly good sight.

O. joubini often seeks shelter from predators in empty clamshells, cans or small openings, pulling the opening closed with its arms, combining sand and gravel to form a lid. It employs the two defensive mechanisms typical of all octopuses: ink sacs and camouflage. All Cephalopods have chromatophores, special pigmented and light reflecting cells on their skin which allows them to change colour and texture quickly.

They are found in the Atlantic Ocean, particularly in the tropical waters of the Caribbean and the Gulf of Mexico. The first holotype was collected in 1929 by Guy Coburn Robson and became a key factor in distinguishing between O. joubini and the closely related Octopus mercatoris (or in some cases, an unidentified species referred to as Octopus sp. X). Much of the information about O. joubini was obtained through laboratory studies of captive specimens and what little is known about their behavior in a natural environment is inferential.

== Physical characteristics ==
O. joubini is red-orange in color which is caused by pigmented cells called chromatophores that are common in many animals. Compared to other species of octopus, the O. joubini color patterning is relatively less complex. They are capable of becoming a dark, light, or intermediate shade ranging from brown to orange. As hatchlings, their chromatophores can also appear yellow.

Though research is limited, some studies suggest that O. joubini have a complex system of sensory cells along their lip that serve a chemotactic function. These cells are highly ciliated and contain high concentrations of sensory neurons, some of which are thought to act as mechanoreceptors, and some as chemoreceptors. These neurons are likely chemoreceptors, considering the species' benthic lifestyle and the advantages that come with chemotactic sensitivity.

== Habitat ==
O. joubini are found in the warm temperate to tropical waters of the Atlantic, thriving in temperatures ranging from 18 to 25 °C (64 to 77 °F). They are benthic and are typically found on soft, muddy substrates around 10 to 15 m (33 to 49 feet) deep. Many laboratory experiments have shown that O. joubini prefer to remain hidden or, in the case of a tank environment, close to the sides of the enclosure. This behavior is presumably for protection against outside predators, though no literature describes specific predators of the O. joubini. In many instances, O. joubini observed in their natural habitat are found hidden in empty soda cans, and some researchers even obtained them by collecting soda cans from the ocean floor. They prefer to shelter in small cavities on the ocean floor and compete for viable crevices with many other animals, including mantis shrimp such as N. bredini.

== Reproduction ==
O. joubini in captivity exhibit highly varied broods ranging from 140 to over 2,500 eggs. They can reach sexual maturity at a very small size, though most spawning adults were at least 30 mm (1.2 inches). Females typically began to lay a new set of eggs when the oldest eggs began to hatch.

The key characteristics that differentiate O. joubini from O. mercatoris, and other unidentified pygmy octopuses, is the size of the eggs and its color. While varying in size, fully developed eggs range from 2.9 to 4.8 mm (0.11 to 0.19 inches), and are overall smaller than other species that were studied, informally referring to them as the "small egg species" that is most representative of the original O. joubini Robson holotype. Additionally, O. joubini appear to have a reddish-orange color that is more distinct than the larger egged species.

== Life cycle ==
Females of this species breed between March and June, laying elliptical, amber eggs in a sheltered place. The hatchlings are relatively small (0.04 grams or 0.62 grains), but are fully formed and can hunt within hours. They reach maturity in around 182 days and weigh about 30 grams (1.1 oz) at this time.

Hatchlings go through a brief planktonic stage where they remain close to the surface of the water for the first 2–3 days and then eventually disperse throughout the water column. These hatchlings average 2.5 mm (0.098 inches) in size and 2.9 milligrams (0.045 grains) in weight. Mortality is high during the first week (up to 90%) but becomes stable afterwards. By the third week, O. joubini undergo intense feeding and rapid growth, sometimes tripling in weight, and transition from the planktonic stage, becoming fully benthic. Their lifespan is temperature dependent and can range from 6–12 months.

== Diet ==
Like all octopuses, O. joubini is carnivorous. It is able to bore into the hard shells of small clams, crustaceans, or other creatures. It uses its radula, a small, spikey, tongue like structure, to drill a hole in the prey's shell, and proceeds to secrete venomous saliva out of its beak to paralyze its victim. While the Atlantic pygmy octopus feeds primarily on small crustaceans, only a few species have been recorded as prey of this species in the wild. In laboratory conditions, this diet is expanded considerably.

== Behavior ==
Though octopuses are solitary animals, they do appear to partake in various social interactions, especially when living in high densities or in limited space (as in a laboratory environment). O. joubini demonstrate loose dominance relationships where larger octopuses would take over a particular area. However, O. joubini do not isolate themselves and are often attracted to spaces where there are others and will often share spaces, suggesting that they are not territorial. They are also more likely to fight with other species, rather than with each other, when competing for space.

== Threats ==
In addition to competition and presumed predation, O. joubini also have to deal with anthropogenic threats such as pollution. In 1999, a harmful algal bloom wiped out an entire population of Octopus mercatoris in St Joseph's Bay, Florida. After five years only one brooding female was collected, demonstrating the long term impact these blooms can have on species. Though research indicated that only the species O. mercatoris was affected, the predicament of this algal bloom could foreshadow possible threats to O. joubini, and other species, where pollution could cause more severe and frequent algal blooms.
