= The Opponent =

The Opponent may refer to:

- The Opponent (1988 film), a 1988 film starring Daniel Greene
- The Opponent (2000 film), a 2000 film starring Erika Eleniak

== See also ==
- Opposition (disambiguation)
- Antagonist (disambiguation)
- Villain (disambiguation)
