= Katha Nayagan =

Katha Nayagan or Kathanayagan (lit. 'Story Hero' or 'Lead Hero'; transl. Protagonist) may refer to these Indian films:

- Kathanayagan (1988 film), a Tamil-language film
- Katha Nayakan, a 1997 Malayalam-language film
- Kathanayagan (2017 film), a Tamil-language film

== See also ==
- Protagonist (disambiguation)
- Kathanayakudu (disambiguation)
- Kadhanayagi (transl. female protagonist), an Indian 2023 Tamil-language TV series
