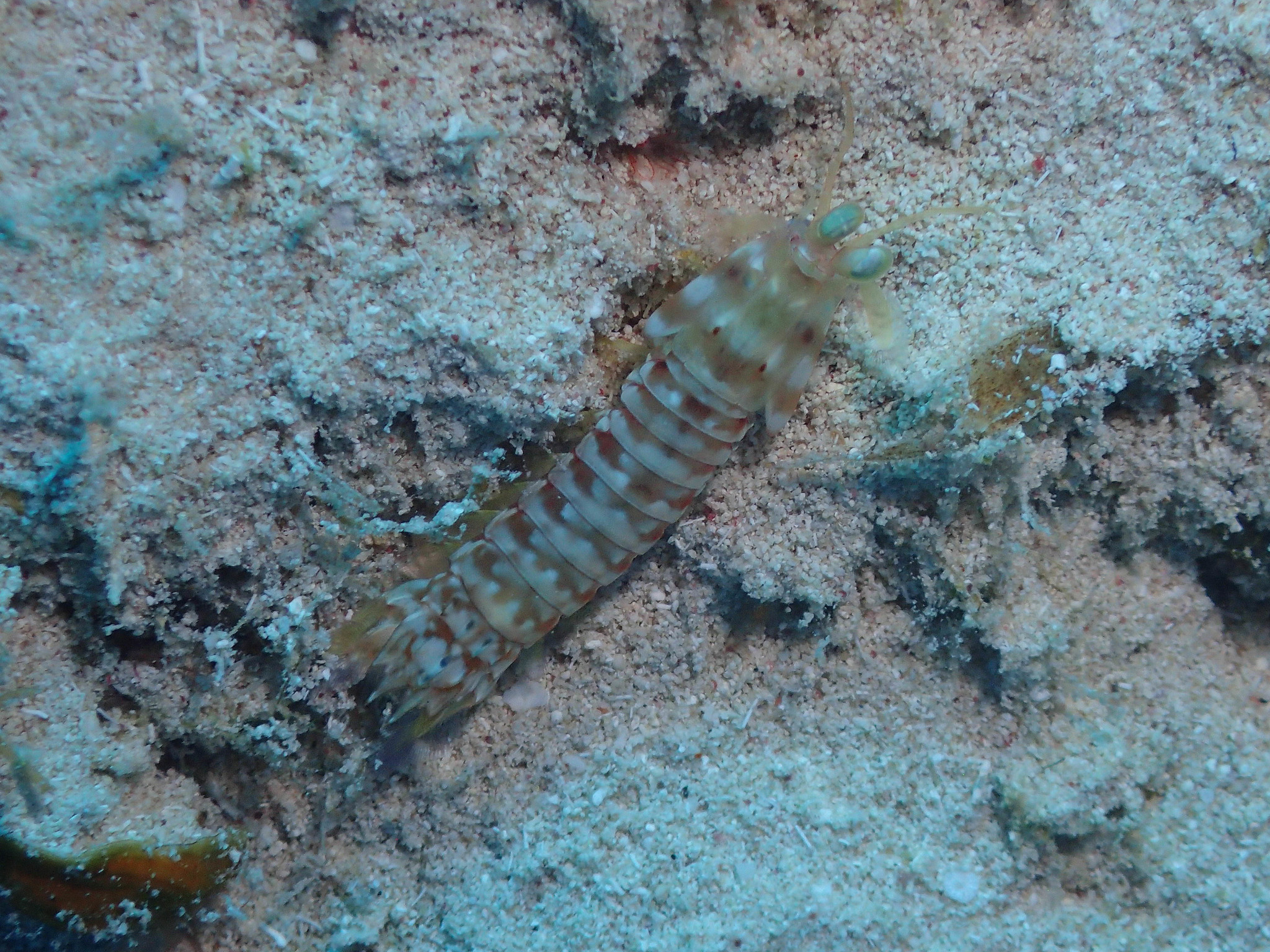

Scientific classification
- Kingdom: Animalia
- Phylum: Arthropoda
- Clade: Pancrustacea
- Class: Malacostraca
- Order: Stomatopoda
- Family: Gonodactylidae
- Genus: Neogonodactylus
- Species: N. oerstedii

Binomial name
- Neogonodactylus oerstedii (Hansen, 1895)

Synonyms
- Gonodactylus oerstedii Hansen, 1895

= Neogonodactylus oerstedii =

Species of burrowing mantis shrimp

Neogonodactylus oerstedii is a burrowing species of mantis shrimp known for its complex visual systems. N. oerstedii are a smasher type of mantis shrimp, using club-shaped raptorial appendages to strike prey and predators. This species belongs to the Stomapoda order, which is known for the complex visual systems of its species. The unique retinal designs of the Stomapoda order give these animals the ability to have unique color-analysis receptor sets, in addition to the detection of ultraviolet and polarized light. N. oerstedii are primarily found in shallow tropical waters of the Caribbean and the Florida Keys and reside in the cavities of the terrain present in their habitat. In this terrain the mantis shrimp create burrows in which they remain for long periods of time. N. oerstedii are primarily foragers and embark on foraging expeditions near their burrows and return to them once completing their trip. This species exhibits variable dorsal colorations ranging from a light cream color to green checkered patterns. It is hypothesized that these colorations of the N. oerstedii provide camouflage from its predators.

== Taxonomy ==
N. oerstedii was first reported by Hans Jacob Hansen in 1895, naming it Gonodactylus oerstedii. Raymond B. Manning then reclassified this species to the Neogonodactylus genus in 1995 subsequently changing the species name to Neogonodactylus oerstedii. N. oerstedii is one of 22 species belonging to the Neogonodactylus genus.

== Visual systems ==
N. oerstedii has some of the most complex eyes in the Animal Kingdom. N. oerstedii has up to sixteen photoreceptors and multiple visual pigments in their eyes. These mantis shrimp also have the capability to detect ultraviolet light. UV light detection is achieved by six distinct UV light receptors present in the eyes of N. oerstedii. The ability to detect UV light is predicted to influence the behavior and ecology of the mantis shrimp. Studies suggest that UV light detection plays roles in vertical migration, feeding efficiencies, and protection from photodamage. In addition, N. oerstedii have extremely complex opsin gene expression. These mantis shrimp have 33 opsin gene transcripts in their genome with twenty encoding for long-wavelength light, ten encoding for middle-wavelength light, and three encoding for UV sensitive opsins.This opsin diversity is the highest reported for any animal. Furthermore, the photoreceptors in oerstedii express multiple opsins. The photoreceptors of the mantis shrimp, however, still behave as if they contain one visual pigment. N. oerstedii has extremely complex retinas, divided into dorsal and ventral hemispheres. A specialized mid band is used for color and polarization vision.

=== Visual systems in larvae ===
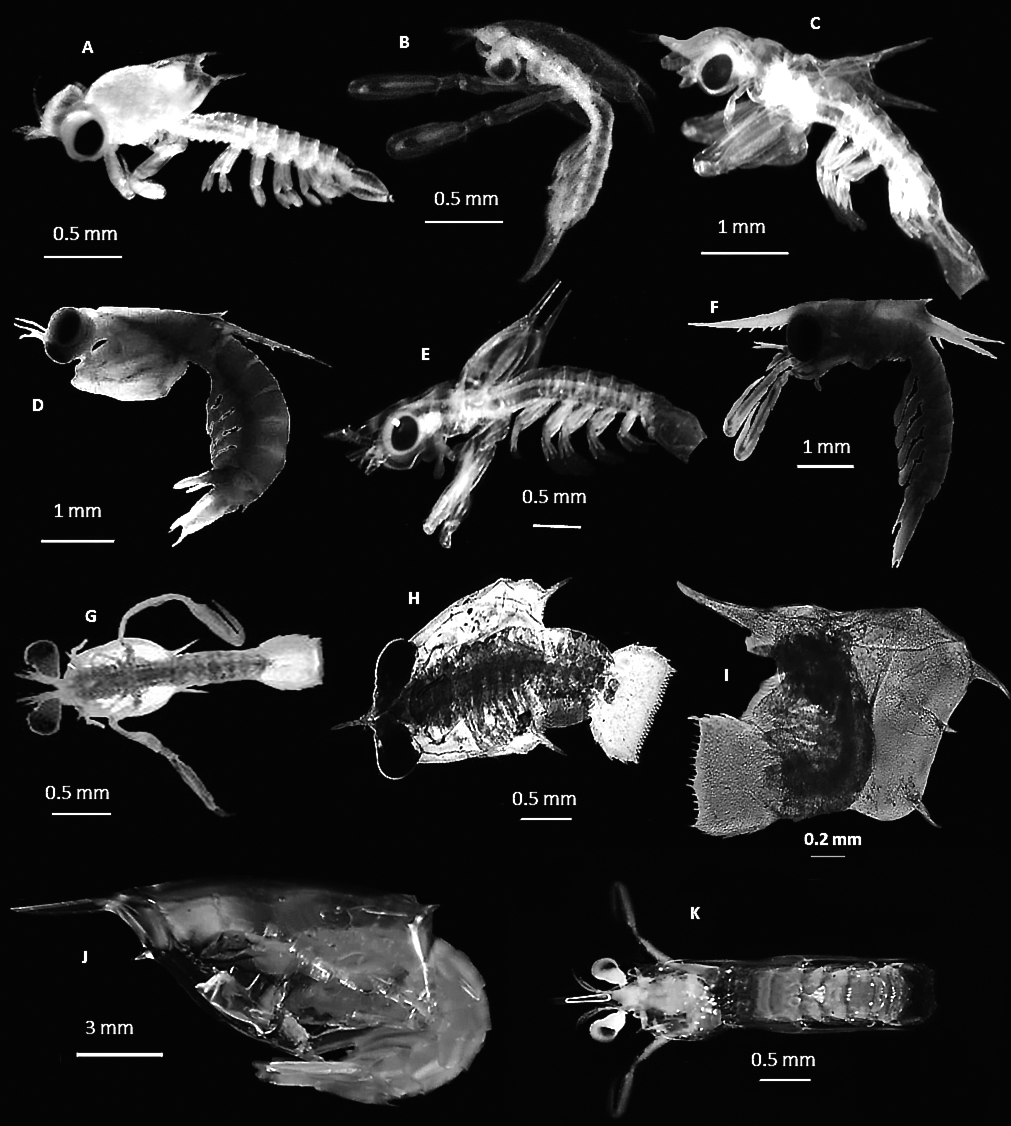
'Neogonodactylus Oerstedii' Larvae

Larval N. oerstedii eyes are physiologically and morphologically different. Larvae have a simple transparent apposition compound eye with the ommatidial units forming a uniform array. Furthermore, N. oerstedii larvae most likely lack the optical filters that create UV channels in adults. Although N. oerstedii larvae have different eye structures compared to the adult mantis shrimp, strong evidence suggests that larvae are able to also sense and respond to UV light. This perception of UV light likely aids the N. oerstedii larvae in prey detection, vertical migration, and contrast perception in their open water habitats.

== Behaviour ==
=== Intraspecies conflict ===
N. oerstedii engages in physical bouts over refuges (burrows). A common example of a refuge valuable to N. oerstedii is coral rock. These refuges allow the mantis shrimp to process food, hide from predators, mate, and brood eggs. Mantis shrimp engage in these bouts with their raptorial appendages. N. oerstedii are particularly devastating as they generate forces thousands of times greater than the mantis shrimp's bodyweight. This force is able to injure or even kill an opposing N. oerstedii. N. oerstedii also uses chemical cues to gain information about an opponent's size and strength. Before engaging in a physical bout, N. oerstedii performs a meral spread which is a threatening display. Performing this meral spread allows for the meral spot to be presented to the opposing N. oerstedii. Nearly all confrontations involving mantis shrimp of similar size lead to a physical contest. Winning this contest does not usually result from a stronger strike but rather which individual strikes the other more times.

=== Meral spot ===
The meral spot of N. oerstedii is likely based on carotenoproteins. This complex's formation relies on the ingestion of carotenoids. In turn, meral spot color is directly influenced by the foraging capability and success of a N. oerstedii. Research has determined that the striking strength of mantis shrimp is directly correlated with the UV reflectance of their meral spot. Additionally, oerstedii with darker meral spots also strike more times in a physical confrontation compared to oerstedii with lighter spots. It is hypothesized that N. oerstedii use meral spots as an honest signal to indicate weapon performance to opponents allowing individuals to avoid confrontation when fighting is too costly.

N. oerstedii exhibit variations in the meral spot color depending on their habitat. N. Oerstedii in rubble habitats present lighter colored meral spots than oerstedii found in seagrass environments. For a mantis shrimp to effectively see a meral spot's UV reflectance, the meral spot must contrast the surrounding environment of the shrimp. This variation in color allows mantis shrimp living in the same environment to efficiently analyze the meral spots of their opponents and vice versa for the challenger. This is an important evolutionary advantage because engaging in a physical bout is extremely costly for mantis shrimp.

=== Foraging ===
N. oerstedii resides in burrows for most of the day. However, to gain resources, oerstedii emerge from their concealed burrows and embark on extended foraging excursions. During these foraging expeditions, oerstedii primarily target clams, snails, and other crustaceans. Furthermore, these expeditions result in the mantis shrimp traveling a distance away from its burrow which leaves it susceptible to predation. To return to their burrows after resource collection, mantis shrimp use path integration to navigate back to their burrows. This entails N. oerstedii monitoring the distances they travel from their burrow by using a biological compass and odometer. This allows the mantis shrimp to formulate a vector leading back to their burrow. However, this system can accumulate errors as the N. oerstedii travel further along their journey. To combat the innate errors in their path integration systems, N. oerstedii also use landmark navigation to reliably get back to their burrows after their foraging expeditions. They use this technique mainly as a back up system when their path integration system is not able to direct them to their burrow.

=== Predation and prey recognition and avoidance ===
As seen in the behavior of recognizing landmarks, N. oerstedii are able to learn novel visual stimuli such as color, linear polarization and circular polarization cues. However, N. oerstedii primarily recognize objects by their shape. This is beneficial to the mantis shrimp due to them inhabiting marine environments. It is hypothesized that N. oerstedii primarily recognize their prey and predators by their shape. N. oerstedii also employ dorsal colorations to camouflage in their specific habitats. N. oerstedii that reside in seagrass habitats exhibit green dorsal colorations while N. oerstedii that live in rubble heavy environments exhibit sandy colorations.

=== Grooming ===
N. oerstedii exhibits grooming behaviour using the carpus and subchela of the first maxillipeds. The mantis shrimp specifically groom their antennae, eyes, subcarapace, and general body. Furthermore, they perform a process called autogrooming. This process can be described by a brief rapid grooming of the left and right maxillipeds. This is the last grooming behaviour in the N. oerstedii grooming sequence. N. oerstedii also infrequently groom their gills, however, the mantis shrimp spend the most time engaging in this behavior compared to the rest of the grooming sites. The sensory regions of the mantis shrimp such as the antenna and the eyes are the most frequent grooming targets of the mantis shrimp.

== Reproduction ==
Members of the N. genus come together only to mate while others mate for life. N. oerstedii exhibit complex maternal behaviors during the brooding of their young. Males produce sperm ducts rather than spermatophores (a protein capsule containing sperm). Females can produce a large amount of progeny, with a maximum brood size at around 50,000 eggs. Females lay eggs in a compact mass and constantly knead it with their maxillipeds. After her eggs hatch she remains with them during the larvae stage. Once the larvae reach the planktonic stage they leave their mother's burrow and enter the open ocean.

== Claw protection ==
The claw strikes of N. oerstedii are extremely devastating to opponents. However, the mantis shrimp are able to inflict these strikes without sustaining substantial damage to their claws. N. oerstedii claws are extremely tough and have crack resistance. This is due to mineralized patterns on the N. oerstedii claws that form a herringbone pattern. Furthermore, mantis shrimp have corkscrew-like fibers beneath the herringbone pattern that form a bouligand structure. This bouligand structure defends the mantis shrimp from high-frequency stress waves. This prevents damaging pressure waves from propagating through the mantis shrimp's arm and body.
