= Villaine =

Villaine may refer to:

- Aubert de Villaine, a French winemaker and social economist
- Vilaine, the historical spelling of a river in France

== See also ==
- Villain (disambiguation)
