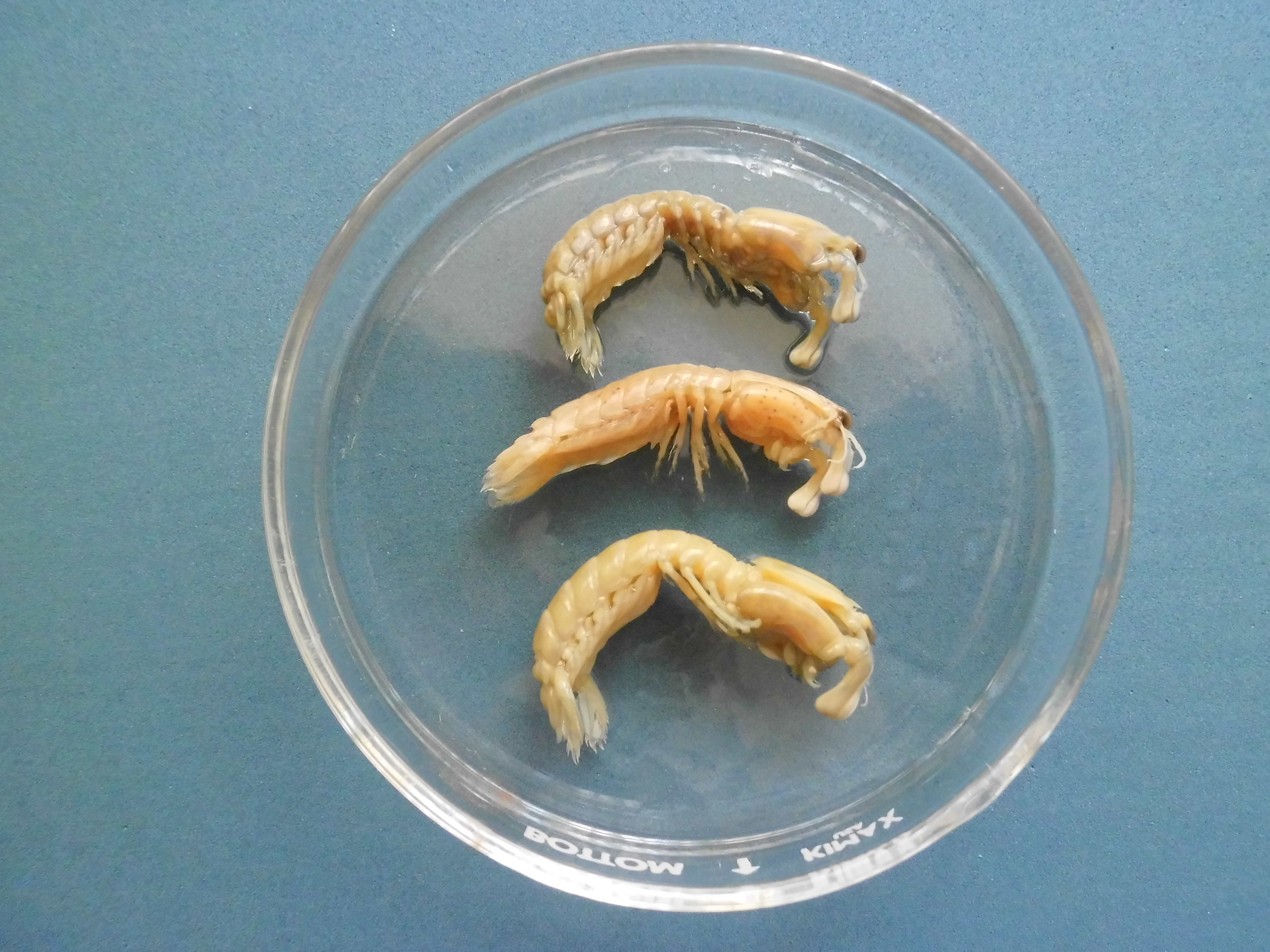

Scientific classification
- Kingdom: Animalia
- Phylum: Arthropoda
- Class: Malacostraca
- Order: Stomatopoda
- Family: Gonodactylidae
- Genus: Neogonodactylus; Manning, 1995

= Neogonodactylus =

Genus of crustaceans

Neogonodactylus is a genus of mantis shrimp. The genus was first described in 1995 by Raymond Manning. Neogonodactylus species are well known for having sophisticated visual systems that allow them to detect UV light; this ability is essential to their communication and foraging strategies in their dynamic coral reef environments. (Ultraviolet vision in Larval Neogonodactylus oerstedii, n.d.). Neogonodactylus oerstedii, the mantis shrimp, homing to burrow is via a combination of path integration and landmark recognition. Path integration ensures a direct home return by measuring distance traveled but is prone to cumulative error that the shrimp cancels out through visual landmarks. In case the cues conflict, N. oerstedii can switch navigation systems, yet the decision mechanism is not clear.

It contains the following species:

- Neogonodactylus albicinctus (Manning & Reaka, 1979)
- Neogonodactylus austrinus (Manning, 1969)
- Neogonodactylus bahiahondensis (Schmitt, 1940)
- Neogonodactylus bredini (Manning, 1969)
- Neogonodactylus campi Manning, 1997
- Neogonodactylus caribbaeus (Schotte & Manning, 1993)
- Neogonodactylus costaricensis (Manning & Reaka, 1979)
- Neogonodactylus curacaoensis (Schmitt, 1924)
- Neogonodactylus festae (Nobili, 1901)
- Neogonodactylus lacunatus (Manning, 1966)
- Neogonodactylus lalibertadensis (Schmitt, 1940)
- Neogonodactylus lightbourni (Manning & Hart, 1981)
- Neogonodactylus minutus (Manning, 1969)
- Neogonodactylus moraisi (Fausto-Filho & Lemos de Castro, 1973)
- Neogonodactylus oerstedii (Hansen, 1895)
- Neogonodactylus petilus (Manning, 1970)
- Neogonodactylus pumilus (Manning, 1970)
- Neogonodactylus spinulosus (Schmitt, 1924)
- Neogonodactylus stanschi (Schmitt, 1940)
- Neogonodactylus torus (Manning, 1969)
- Neogonodactylus wennerae Manning & Heard, 1997
- Neogonodactylus zacae (Manning, 1972)
