= Haptosquilla =

Scientific classification
- Kingdom: Animalia
- Phylum: Arthropoda
- Clade: Pancrustacea
- Class: Malacostraca
- Order: Stomatopoda
- Family: Protosquillidae
- Genus: Haptosquilla; Manning, 1969

Genus of crustaceans

Haptosquilla is a genus of crustaceans belonging to the family Protosquillidae. The genus was first described in 1969 by Raymond Manning. The species of this genus are found in all oceans.

== List of species ==
- Haptosquilla corrugata Ahyong, 2001
- Haptosquilla ectypa (Müller, 1886)
- Haptosquilla glabra (Lenz, 1905)
- Haptosquilla glyptocercus (Wood-Mason, 1875)
- Haptosquilla hamifera (Odhner, 1923)
- Haptosquilla helleri Ahyong, 2012
- Haptosquilla moosai Erdman & Manning, 1998
- Haptosquilla philippinensis Garcia & Manning, 1982
- Haptosquilla proxima (Kemp, 1915)
- Haptosquilla pulchella (Miers, 1880)
- Haptosquilla pulchra (Hansen, 1926)
- Haptosquilla setifera Manning, 1969
- Haptosquilla stoliura (Müller, 1887) 1886
- Haptosquilla tanensis (Fukuda, 1911)
- Haptosquilla togianensis Erdman & Manning, 1998
- Haptosquilla trispinosa (Dana, 1852)
- Haptosquilla tuberosa (Pocock, 1893)
