= Agonistic behaviour =

Any social behaviour related to fighting

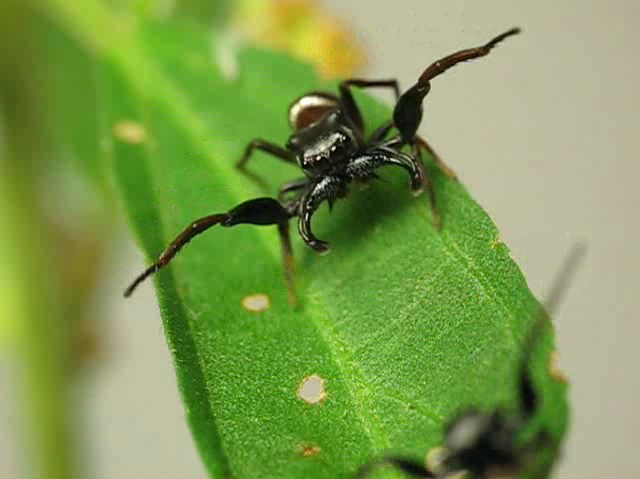
Ritualized agonistic behaviour between male Zygoballus sexpunctatus spiders

Agonistic behaviour is any social behaviour related to fighting, which can include aggressive behaviour, but also threats, displays, retreats, placation, and conciliation. The term "agonistic behaviour" was first defined and used by J.P. Scott and Emil Fredericson in 1951 in their paper "The Causes of Fighting in Mice and Rats" in Physiological Zoology. Agonistic behaviour is seen in many animal species because resources including food, shelter, and mates are often limited.

Ritualized aggression or ritualized fighting is when animals use a range of behaviours as posture or warning but without engaging in serious aggression or fighting, which would be expensive in terms of energy and the risk of injury. Ritualized aggression involves a graded series of behaviours or displays that include threatening gestures (such as vocalizations, spreading of wings or gill covers, lifting and presentation of claws, head bobbing, tail beating, lunging, etc.) and occasionally posturing physical actions such as inhibited (non-injurious) bites. This behavior is explained by evolutionary game theory.

Some forms of agonistic behaviour are between contestants who are competing for access to the same resources, such as food or mates. Other times, it involves tests of strength or threat display that make animals look large and more physically fit, a display that may allow it to gain the resource before an actual battle takes place. Although agonistic behaviour varies among species, agonistic interaction consists of three kinds of behaviours: threat, aggression, and submission. These three behaviours are functionally and physiologically interrelated, yet fall outside the narrow definition of aggressive behaviour. While any one of these divisions of behaviours may be seen alone in an interaction between two animals, they normally occur in sequence from start to end. Depending on the availability and importance of a resource, behaviours can range from a fight to the death or a much safer ritualistic behaviour, though ritualistic or display behaviours are the most common form of agonistic behaviours.

== As studied in rodents ==
Scott and Fredericson describe that agonistic behaviour is displayed in a variety of different circumstances in response to different stimuli. Scott and Fredericson studied mice and rats, and classified three main categories of agonistic behaviour these animals display, which include preliminary behaviour, attack, and defensive and escape behaviour. Preliminary behaviour describes the behaviours displayed by these rodents if fighting does not immediately begin. These may include involuntary behaviours such as hair-fluffing, where the rodent's hair stands up on end with no prominence on a particular region of the body, or tail-rattling where the rodent's tail experiences muscle contraction and twitches from side to side, making a loud sound if struck against a hard object. Another preliminary agonistic behaviour demonstrated by mice is referred to as mincing behaviour which is when mice circle their opponent before a fight begins. The fight itself is classified as one of the pattern of behaviour that occurs and involves physical violence between the rodents. Finally, the defensive and escape behaviour occurs usually immediately after the fight and is displayed by the mouse that was defeated in the fight. The defeated mouse, if allotted space, will run away and try and take shelter from the victorious mouse. If it is not possible for the mouse to physically run and escape because space is not available, the defeated mouse will rear up on its hind legs and hold its front legs up in a way that is characterized as a "submissive stance". These are examples of the physical behaviours that are responses to conflict in mice.

== Evolution and ecology of agonistic behaviour: Stomatopoda (praying mantis shrimp) ==
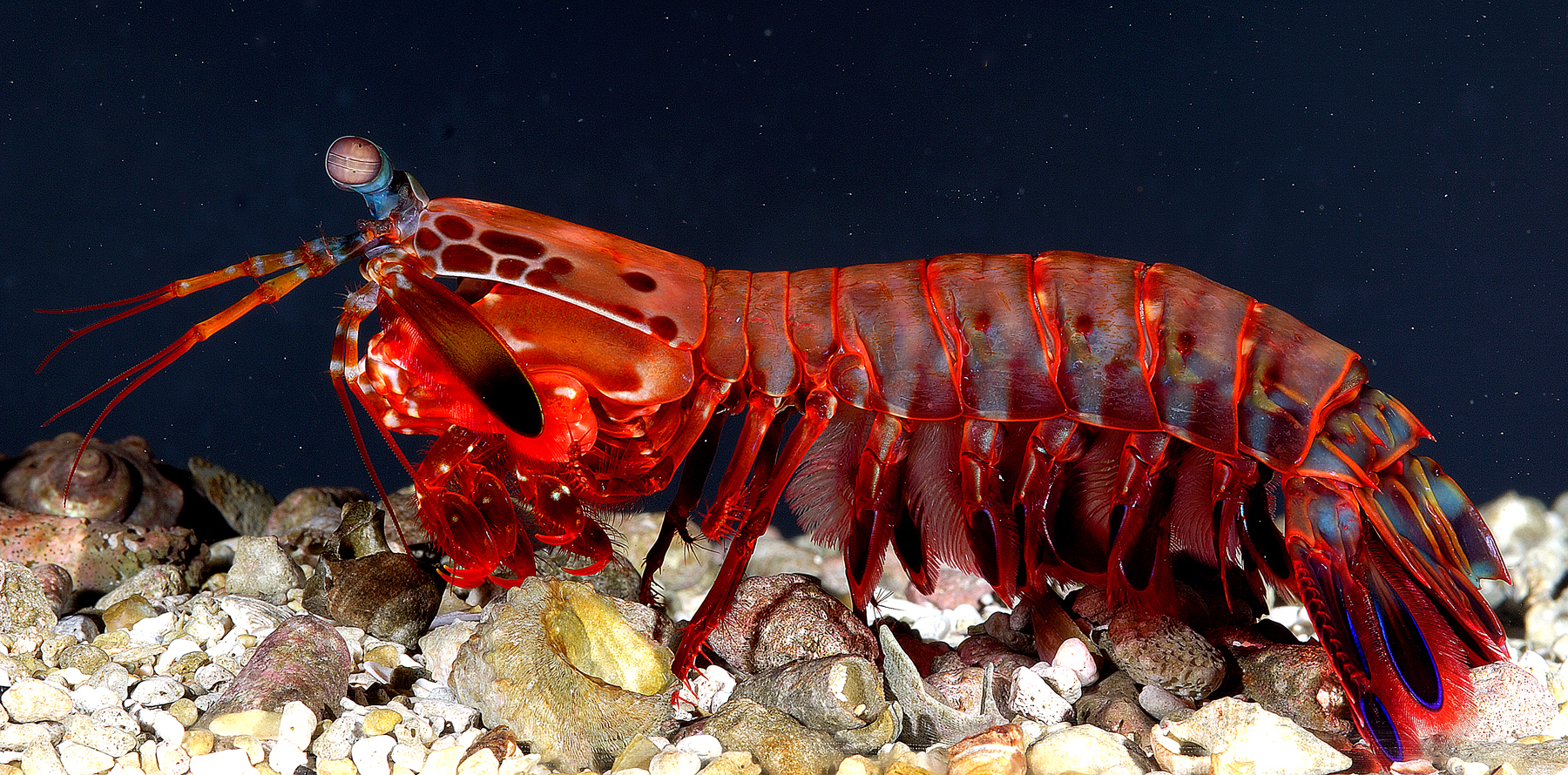
Mantis shrimp

Agonistic behaviour is a result of evolution, and this can be studied in a number of species facing different environmental pressures. Though agonistic behaviours can be directly observed and studied in a laboratory setting, it is also important to understand these behaviours in a natural setting to fully comprehend how they have evolved and therefore differ under different selective pressures. Mantis shrimp, predatory crustaceans, are an example of an aggressive and territorial organism whose agonistic behaviour has been studied in an ecological and evolutionary context.

Mantis shrimp are among the world's most aggressive crustaceans. These sea creatures are secretive, but highly alert and active predators who inhabit burrows and cavities along coral reefs, rocky coasts, and muddy shores of tropical and subtropical waters.

Roy Caldwell and Hugh Dingle conducted research on mantis shrimp and other stomatopods, which focused on the evolution of agonistic behaviour and how it applies to the ecology of these organisms. Agonistic behaviour has co-evolved alongside biotic factors such as body morphology, competition both within the species and against other species, and the habitats that these shrimp inhabit. Stomatopods arose from leptostracan stock, as is indicated by fossil evidence, approximately 400 million years ago. Morphology of stomatopods is consistent with most malacostracans in that they have three main body segments: the cephalon, the thorax and the abdomen. The abdomen is made up of six segments, five of which possess a pair of pleopods, which are used for respiration and swimming.

The key appendage used by stomatopods for fighting behaviour is referred to as the raptorial appendage, which is actually a pair of enlarged second maxillipeds just behind the maxillae. These strong maxillipeds are used for purposes of prey capture in addition to fighting. The morphology of this appendage, particularly the propodus and dactyl which extend forward in such a way that resembles the striking appendage of a praying mantis, gives this crustacean its name. Caldwell et al. classified the raptorial appendage into two categories based on its functional purpose: a smashing appendage or a spearing appendage. The smashing appendage is possessed by members of gonodactylidae and the dactyl contains several short spines. The spearing appendage is possessed by squillids, lysiosquillids, bathysquillids, and a couple gonodactylids; the last group contains both spearers and smashers.

"Smashers" are able to use the raptorial appendage with such a force, particularly the gonodactylids, that they are able to smash the glass of double walled aquaria in the laboratory. These smashers are able to use this immense force to kill same-species competitors with one blow. Caldwell et al. describe how two stomatopods generally display severe fighting behaviour when they have an encounter, both between species and within the same species, and males and females display the same level of this behaviour except in breeding season. Most species of stomatopods, regardless of the type of appendage, ordinarily deliver blows during agonistic encounters with the dactyl closed. When the dactyl is open, the result is usually serious injury or death of the opponent. These crustaceans may deliver blows with the dactyl open but generally only in situations of extremely intense fighting displays, which are rare amongst most species.

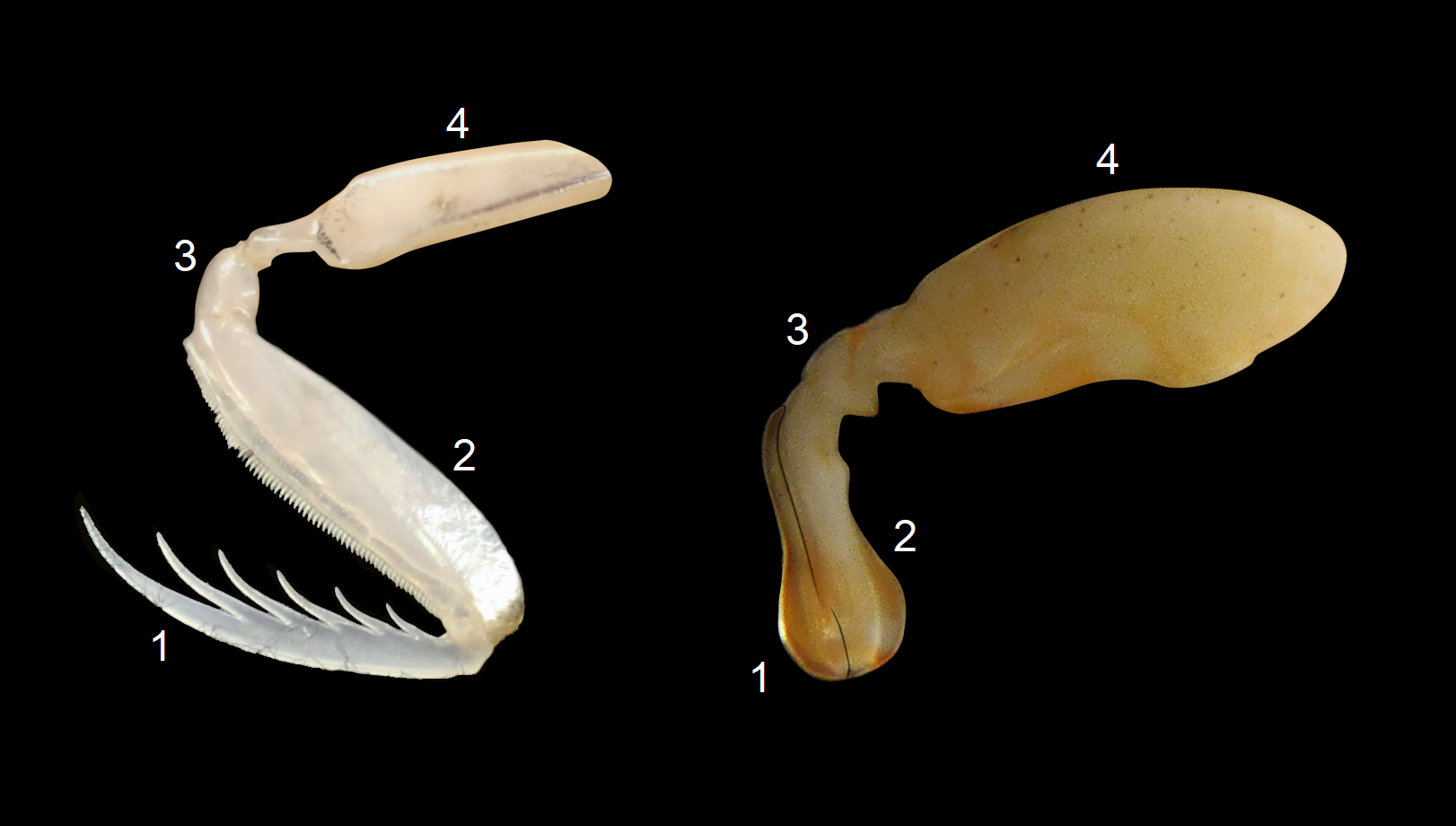
A comparison of "smasher" and "spearer" stomatopods; the spearer appendage is on the left.

Behaviour that is common during agonistic displays is raptorial appendage display, which is a common behaviour across many taxa. Display and expansion of the raptorial appendage is conducted in order to make the animal appear larger and therefore more threatening to competitors in times of agonistic encounters, and comparable displays in other taxa include teeth baring in canines or horn display in ungulates. This display behaviour is an evolutionarily conserved behaviour in agonistic displays.

Evolutionary differences are clear in "smasher" and "spearer" stomatopods who inhabit different substrates and either burrow or do not burrow. Caldwell et al. describe these differences with respect to a behavioural display called a "meral spread". This behaviour is described by these researchers as the most extreme of raptorial appendage displays, and is defined by the elevation of the cephalothorax and antennae and antennules while the raptorial appendage itself is elevated and spread. Interestingly, this meral spread may be displayed dozens of times during an agonistic encounter and Caldwell et al. explain it is used as a method to inhibit actual physical violence. Research on Neogonodactylus oerstedii shows that meral spot reflectance is directly correlated with the mantis shrimp's foraging success, indicating that the meral spot likely serves as an honest signal. Further studies on N. bredini, however, suggest that meral spreads are not directly related to strike force or fighting ability.

An evolutionary divergence between stomatopods is described in appearance of the meral spot, which is a dorsal, medial groove on the raptorial merus of the raptorial appendage. Smasher stomatopods, which are species that tend to inhabit cavities within rocks or coral, have brightly coloured meral spots which aid in making the meral spot more visible during these meral spread displays in fights. These bright meral spots possessed by smashers are either yellow, blue, red or white and are outlined by a conspicuous black pigment. Conversely, spearing Stomatopods or some smashing species that do not inhabit rock or coral cavities, have much duller meral spots. This correlation suggests to researchers that habitat and meral spot colouration have co-evolved, and those that inhabit burrows possess these bright spots and those species that do not have dull spots. This demonstrates how ecology and evolution of organisms within the same order directly affects agonistic behaviour.

== Hormonal influence ==
Agonistic behaviour is influenced by the action of hormones such as vasopressin, which is a small peptide synthesized in the brain by magnocellular neurons. Agonistic behaviour itself may be divided into two categories: offensive or defensive. Each of these classes of agonistic behaviour are the result of different neurobehavioural pathways, and offensive and defensive agonistic behaviour are elicited by different stimuli.

Offensive behaviour specifically has been studied in the context of intruder interactions in studies employing rodents as test subjects. For example, when an unfamiliar male hamster is placed into cage of a conspecific male, a stereotypical suite of agonistic behaviours follow. The resident male approaches the intruder and sniffs him intently, threatens the intruder with an upright posture, and finally initiates a physical attack on the intruder. The resident male attacks the belly of the intruder male and attempts to maneuver the intruder onto his back.

Studies have shown that offensive behaviour displayed by hamsters may be modulated due to the presence of vasopressin. Specifically, research conducted by Ferris et al. (1990) suggests that when a vasopressin receptor antagonist is injected into the anterior hypothalamus of the resident male, the tendency to attack intruder males decreases as the dose of antagonist increases. This antagonist has been known to decrease the tendency of offensive aggression via injections into the ventrolateral hypothalamus, therefore is able to act on multiple regions of the brain and exhibit the same effects of offsetting this agonistic behaviour.

While vasopressin plays a role in offensive aggression in agonistic behaviour, serotonin also plays a role in aggressive behaviour in rodents as well as similar effects in humans. Research has shown that increased levels of serotonin or stimulating serotonin receptors in rodents corresponds with decreased agonistic behavioural display, such as behaviours like attacking and biting.

Male resident hamsters, which typically always display stereotypical offensive agonistic behaviours, display a significant decrease in bite attempts toward intruder males when treated with a serotonin reuptake inhibitor called fluoxetine. Vasopressin and serotonin both play significant roles in agonistic behavioural displays, and understanding the interaction of these two opposing neurotransmitters is important in fully understanding the neurobiology of agonistic behaviour. It is understood that vasopressin enhances aggression in agonistic displays due to increased activity in the neural pathways that are associated with increased flank marking and the offensive aggression demonstrated in resident hamsters in the presence of an intruder. This neural pathway that enhances aggression is subdued by the presence of serotonin. It is hypothesized that serotonin acts as an antagonist to vasopressin by eliciting its effects on vasopressin-sensitive neurons and therefore inhibiting these neurons.

Steroid hormones are also associated with offensive aggression behaviour. Androgens in particular have well documented effects on enhancing aggression in male rodents, and testosterone injections into the septum and medial pre-optic area of castrated mice greatly increased offensive aggression. Glucocorticoids also have reported effects on agonistic behaviour in mice, though these effects are not as thoroughly understood as effects of androgens. Research has demonstrated that in mice that have been defeated in agonistic encounters have elevated levels of corticosterone, which appears to enhance submissive behaviour and therefore has opposing effects on agonistic aggressive behaviour.

== Prediction of winning ==
The type of agonistic behaviour observed, whether it be aggressive or submissive, all depend on the likelihood of winning. For instance, size is usually a good predictor of fighting success, and many animals will display to flaunt their size. Animals are better able to assess their next form of agonistic action by judging the opponent's size and if they are likely to win a fight if a physical altercation were to occur.

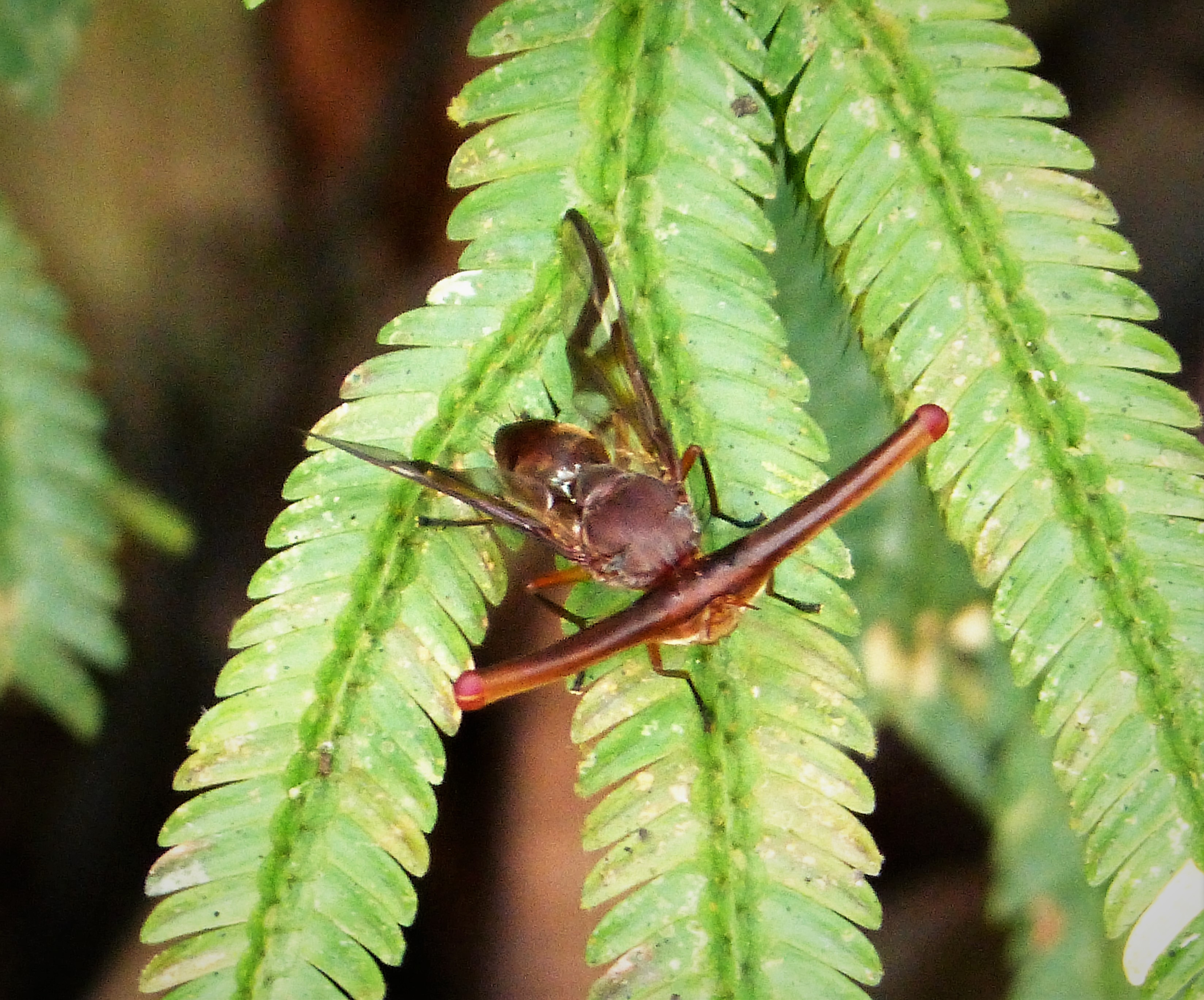
Stalk-eyed fly

=== Example: Stalk-eyed flies (Diopsidae) ===
In aggressive behaviour by male stalk-eyed flies the males "square off" by displaying their eyes. Females show a strong preference for mating with males with longer eyestalks. Due to the female preference, males have evolved to compete with each other for mating rights. In the threat display the two flies face each other head-to-head, with their forelegs spread outward and parallel to the eyestalks. This behaviour allows each individual to judge the distance between its competitor's eyes. Eyestalk length increases with body size, and males with shorter eyestalks will usually retreat. A further distance between the eyes conveys a bigger body size, and a better chance of winning.

== Avoidance ==
Physical fighting is actually rare between animals. It would seem that normally the more aggressive an animal is, the more it has to gain. However, in a normal scenario if an animal is too aggressive it might face an unacceptably high cost such as severe injury or death. Unless an animal has a sure indication that they will win without injury, or the resources are valuable enough for the risk of death, animals usually avoid fighting. An animal must weigh the relative costs and benefits of fighting. If the costs are too high, avoiding a fight is preferable.

== Ritual display ==
For animals, display is any behaviour modified by evolution that is used to convey information. Animals display particular signs, which recipients can use to infer something about the mental and physical state of the first animal. To avoid the heavy cost of fighting, animals have evolved sophisticated rituals, which they use to bluff their opponents into backing down or fleeing. The cost-benefit model of display makes three assumptions: (1) type of display varies depending on the cost; (2) the risk of the display increases as the effectiveness of display increases; and (3) the value of resource being disputed over determines the choice of display used. Animals have evolved to use their physical attributes as a display of ability. If contests can be resolved with ritual display, fighting is not needed. Display can be used to dispute for mates, territory, and food through symbolic gestures instead of battles to the death. If an animal can display without fighting that he is more physically fit than his opponent, he will have gained more than he would have if he had fought and in the process possibly been injured.

=== Examples ===
==== Male grey catbird (Dumetella carolinensis) ====
Male grey catbirds fluff their feathers and spread their lower tails to defend their territory when threatened by another male. The bird that is capable of puffing up and appearing to be the biggest will win the territory.

==== Western gorilla (Gorilla gorilla) ====
Male western gorillas display a wide range of both vocal and gestural communications when threatened by an opponent. A silverback will start hooting, throwing, chest pounding, leg kicks, and sideways running when approached by another male. This is done to intimidate the opponent and show physical abilities without actually making any physical contact.

==== Ring-tailed lemur ====
Male ring-tailed lemurs have scent glands on their wrists, chests, and in the genital area. During encounters with rival males they may perform ritualized aggression by having a "stink fight". The males anoint their tails by rubbing the ends of their tails on the inside of their wrists and on their chests. They then arch their tails over their bodies and wave them at their opponent. The male toward which this is directed either responds with a display of his own, physical aggression, or flees. "Stink fights" can last from 10 minutes to one hour.

==== Oscar cichlids ====
Oscar cichlids (Astronotus ocellatus) are able to rapidly alter their colouration, a trait which facilitates ritualised territorial and combat behaviours amongst conspecifics. Individuals of another cichlid species, the blunthead cichlid (Tropheus moorii), defend their feeding territory with a display, quivering the tail and fins to intimidate, or an attack, darting at the intruder and chasing them away. Astatotilapia burtoni cichlids have similar displays of aggressive behaviour if they are territorial, which include threat displays and chasing.

== Threats ==
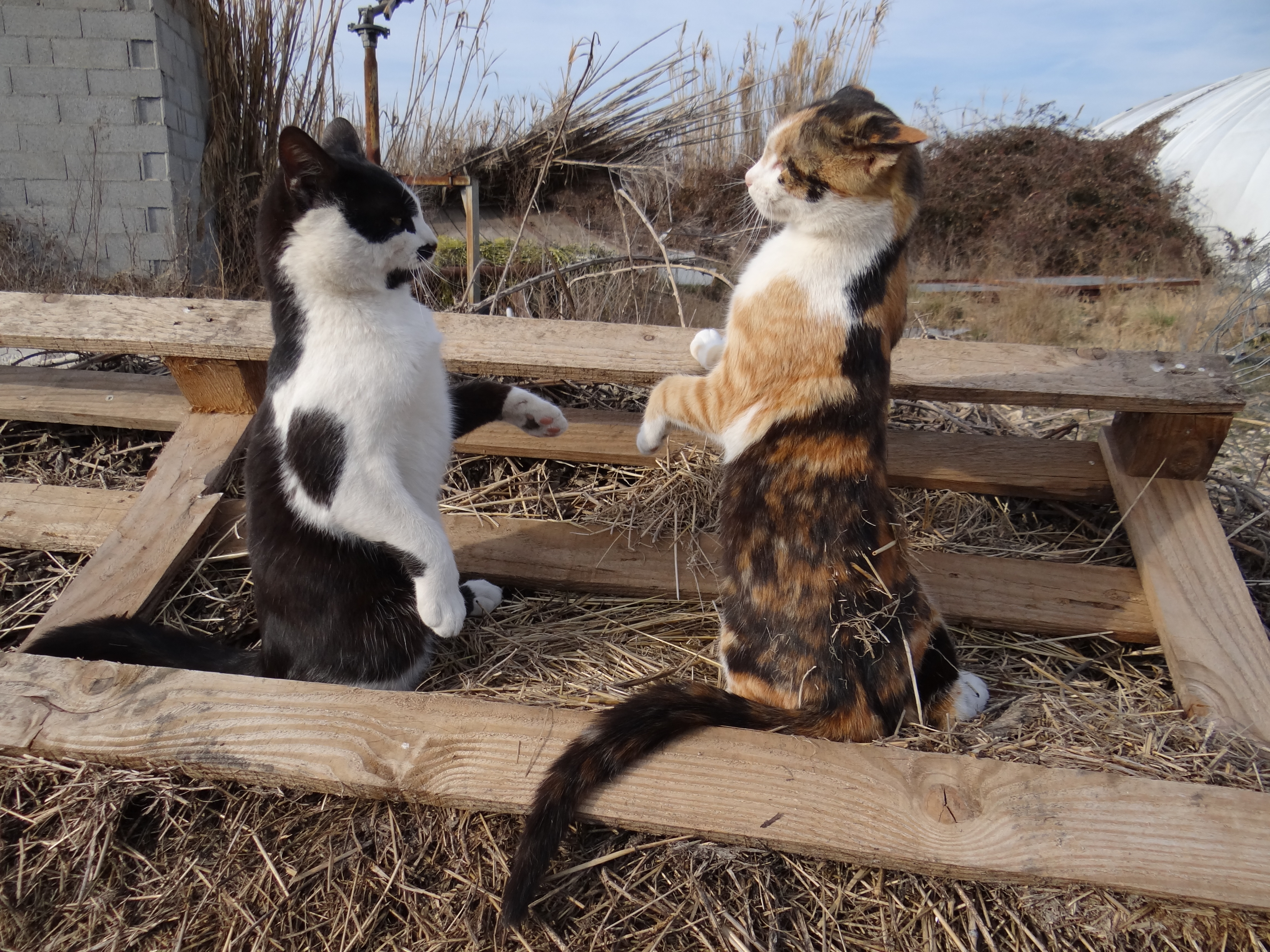
Two domestic cats threatening each other. Note the more flattened ears of the cat on the right

Threat behaviour is any behaviour that signifies hostility or intent to attack another animal. Threat behaviour is meant to cause the opponent to back down and leave. While ritual display can be used for an array of reasons or communicative purposes, threat distinctly is meant for hostility and is the last step before fighting or submission. Threat does not involve physical contact with another animal. Any threat behaviour most often elicits other agonistic behaviour in the recipient. This initiation of threat will result in a display of physical attributes, a fight, or submission; the behaviour or sequence of behaviours depends on what resources are being fought over and each individual's chance of winning against his opponent. In any animal species, threat always contains components of attack and fleeing, which expresses an animal's readiness and likelihood of winning. An intimidation display with a means to threat are exhibited through: hair bristling, feather ruffling, raising skin folds and crest, teeth displaying, horn displaying, making sound, etc.

=== Examples ===
==== Frill-necked lizard (Chlamydosaurus kingii) ====
Chlamydosaurus kingii, an Australian agamid lizard, uses its frill as a way to display size and aggression to opponents. It is one of the largest and most notable displays seen in the animal kingdom. In comparison to its body size, the frill can flare out to make the lizards head look several times bigger, and it displays bright orange and red scales. Males of C. kingii fight and display frills often during the mating seasons. The male ritualistic display includes repeated partial erections of the frill, head bobbing, tail lashing, and waving of forelimbs.

==== Spider monkeys ====
Spider monkeys (genus Ateles) defend their territory by screams, barks, rattling or dropping branches, and urinating and defecating on intruders below.

== Agonistic fighting ==
Agonistic behaviour in a zoo between two chickens

Actual fighting in contests is rare because of the risk of injury to both participants. It is most likely to occur when individuals are similarly sized, or when the contested resource is essential for reproduction or survival. Even when agonistic behaviour escalates to fighting, restraint may be used. Fish such as Oreochromis mossambicus often exhibit aggressive displays, but rarely fight to the point of injury or bodily harm. This is also the case in fights among some male venomous snakes; they wrestle, but refrain from biting.

=== Examples ===
==== Black mamba (Dendroaspis polylepis) ====
Agonistic fighting for black mambas involves a wrestling match in which opponents attempt to pin each other's head repeatedly to the ground. Fights normally last a few minutes but can extend to over an hour. The purpose of fighting is to secure mating rights to receptive females nearby during the breeding season.

==== Creek chub ====
The creek chub (Semotilus atromaculatus) engages in ritualized aggression when others of the species invade its territory. Engaging in parallel swimming, the fish widens its fins and mouth and swims at a caudal fin beat. Intimidating opponent fish throughout these rituals, the forward fish stops and directs blows to the head of the other fish to ensure territory dominance.

== Submissive behaviour ==
Submissive behaviour involves an individual indicating by an act or posture that it will not challenge a dominant individual in a social group. Submissive behaviours are part of the maintenance of a dominance hierarchy of cooperating individuals in a social group that have overlapping but not entirely coincident interests.

=== Example: Bearded dragon (Pogona vitticeps) ===
Communication between animals is often achieved by adding a succession of behaviours to a display. Social interactions among bearded dragons (Pogona vitticeps) consist of a unique set of movements or visual signals. Waving is one of the most visible signs of submission one lizard can display to another. The lizard rests on three of its legs, raises one of the front arms and then slowly waves the arm in a circular motion. This circular motion, along with the dragon puffing up slightly, shows submission. This display is seen between opponents, as well as adolescents towards adults.

== See also ==
- Aggression
- Animal communication
- Competition (biology)
- Courtship display § Agonistic behavior and courtship
- Dear enemy recognition
- Display (zoology)
- Dominance hierarchy (alpha male, pecking order)
- Learned helplessness
- Meat ant § Ritualised fighting
- Ritual warfare (among humans)
- Territory (animal)
