= Antagonist (disambiguation) =

An antagonist is a character opposing the protagonist in literature.

Antagonist may also refer to:

== Science and medicine ==
- Antagonist (muscle), a muscle type
- Receptor antagonist, a class of drugs that bind to but do not trigger a receptor
- Physiological antagonists, a drug that produces an opposite effect (without blocking the same receptor)

== Arts and entertainment ==
- Antagonist A.D., a New Zealand metalcore band
- Antagonist (band), metalcore band from Whittier, California
- Antagonist (album), the debut album of the German Metalcore band Maroon
- The Antagonists (Haggard novel), a 1964 novel by William Haggard
- The Antagonists (Gann novel), a 1971 novel by Ernest K. Gann
- Antagonist, a 2007 book in the Childe Cycle by Gordon R. Dickson and David W. Wixon
- Antagonist, a 2011 album by Neurotech
- The Antagonists (TV series), a 1991 American television series
- Antagonist Tour, a 2025 concert tour by Playboy Carti

== Other ==
- HMS Antagonist

== See also ==
- Inverse agonist (pharmacology)
- Agonist-Antagonist (pharmacology)
- O Antagonista
- Antagonism (disambiguation)
- Agonist (disambiguation)
- Protagonist (disambiguation)
- The Opponent (disambiguation)
- Villain (disambiguation)
