= Villano =

Villano may refer to:

- Vittorio Villano (born 1988), Belgian footballer
- Villano de las Encartaciones, Spanish dog breed
- Any of the members of the Mendoza professional wrestling family who wrestled under the ring name "Villano":
  - Villano I (1950–2001), real name José de Jesús Díaz Mendoza
  - Villano II (1949–1989), real name José Alfredo Díaz Mendoza
  - Villano III (1952–2018), real name Arturo Díaz Mendoza
  - Villano IV (born 1965), real name Thomas Díaz Mendoza
  - Villano V (born 1962), real name Raymundo Díaz Mendoza, Jr.
  - Villano III Jr. (born 1998), Mexican third-generation luchador enmascarado
- Villanos (band), an Argentinian band

== See also ==
- Villanova (disambiguation)
