= Drug antagonism =

Medicine preventing a biological response

Drug antagonism refers to a medicine stopping the action or effect of another substance, preventing a biological response. The stopping actions are carried out by four major mechanisms, namely chemical, pharmacokinetic, receptor and physiological antagonism. The four mechanisms are widely used in reducing overstimulated physiological actions. Drug antagonists can be used in a variety of medications, including anticholinergics, antihistamines, etc. The antagonistic effect can be quantified by pharmacodynamics. Some can even serve as antidotes for toxicities and overdose.

== Receptor antagonism ==
=== Mechanism of action ===
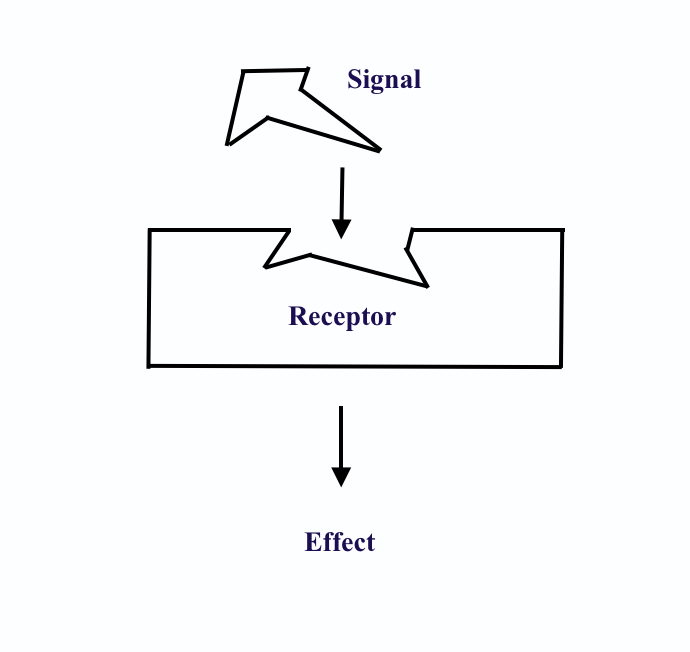
A ligand is a signal which binds to the receptor to form a ligand-receptor complex. The complex further produces a physiological effect.

Receptors bind with endogenous ligands to produce a physiological effect and regulate the body and cellular homeostasis. In a ligand-receptor interaction, the ligand binds with the receptors to form a drug-receptor complex, producing a biological response. The biological nature of receptors can be enzymes, nucleic acids or cellular proteins. Common types of receptors include G-protein coupled receptors, nuclear receptors and ion channels.

Functional antagonists would not produce a biological response after binding with a receptor. It blocks the binding of endogenous ligands to the receptors and thus inhibits the subsequent physiological effect.

=== Types of receptor antagonism ===
==== Reversible and irreversible competitive antagonism ====
Both agonist and antagonist bond the same active site. Adding agonist dose can reverse the effect of reversible competitive antagonism. Irreversible competitive antagonism occurs when the antagonist binds to the same spot on the receptor as the agonist but dissociates from the receptors very slowly or not. As a result, when the agonist is delivered, there is no change in the antagonist occupancy. Since a receptor can only hold one molecule at a time, competitive antagonists can reduce the agonist occupancy (percentage of receptors to which the agonist is bound). Raising the agonist concentration can bring back the agonist occupancy and the subsequent tissue response due to their competition. Thus, the opposition is surmountable. The amount to which the competitive antagonist causes the agonist log concentration–effect curve to shift to the right while maintaining its maximum slope is a measure of the dosage ratio. The antagonist concentration causes the dosage ratio to rise linearly.

==== Non-competitive (irreversible) antagonism ====
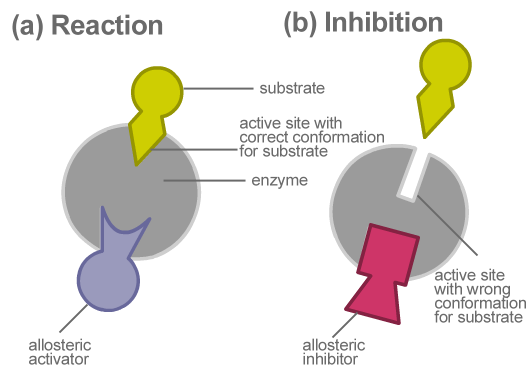
Under normal conditions, an allosteric activator (blue binder) is present to activate the reaction. An allosteric antagonist (red binder) binds to an allosteric site, which leads to conformational change in the receptor's active site, making the active site incompatible with the substrate.

===== Allosteric antagonists =====
Different active sites are bonded by agonist and antagonist, which means the antagonist obstructs the chain of events that triggers the agonist to produce a response at a point downstream from the agonist binding site on the receptor. It irreversibly binds to the active site.

One examples is when Ketamine enters the NMDA receptor's ion channel pore and blocks it, stopping ions from passing through the channels. Also, medication like nifedipine and verapamil stops Ca2+ from entering the cell membrane and so non-selectively prevent medications that act at any receptor that binds to these calcium channels from causing smooth muscle contraction.

===== Partial agonists and full agonists =====
In the presence of a full agonist exerting its maximal effect, a partial agonist can behave like a competitive antagonist to lower the effect of receptor binding, generating merely a submaximal reaction. These variations can be evaluated regarding effectiveness, indicating the agonist-receptor complex's "strength" in causing a tissue response. It relies on receptor occupancy and response. A particular medication of intermediate efficacy may appear as a partial agonist in one tissue (lower level of receptor expression) and a full agonist in another (high level of receptor expression) across distinct cell types expressing the same receptor but at varying densities.

=== Clinical use ===
==== Reversible and irreversible competitive antagonism ====
Competitive antagonists are usually structurally similar to the active compound since they are structural analogues that have to bind to the same pocket. Examples of reversible competitive antagonists like antihistamines (Figure 1) compete with histamine (Figure 2) to bind to histamine receptors, blocking the allergic response by histamine. They are used in treating histamine-mediated allergies and allergic rhinitis.

Figure 2. Histamine

Figure 1. H1 Antihistamine

Irreversible competitive antagonists like phenoxybenzamine do not dissociate from alpha-adrenergic receptors. It is used to block the activity of alpha receptors in sympathetic pathway and is used in the treatment of paroxysmal hypertension and sweating resulting from pheochromocytoma and benign prostate hyperplasia.

== Chemical antagonism ==
=== Mechanism of action ===
Chemical antagonism occurs when a chemical antagonist combines with a ligand to form an inactive product compound, inhibiting the response. In chemical antagonism, the receptors are not involved in the process, and the antagonist directly binds with or removes the ligand. It prevents the ligand from binding to the receptor. As the ligand cannot stimulate the receptor, no physiological effect is generated by the receptors and thus provides an inhibitory effect. The common types of chemical antagonism include chelating agents, neutralising antibodies and salt aggregation.

Figure 3. Dimercaprol structure

=== Clinical use ===
==== Chelating agent ====
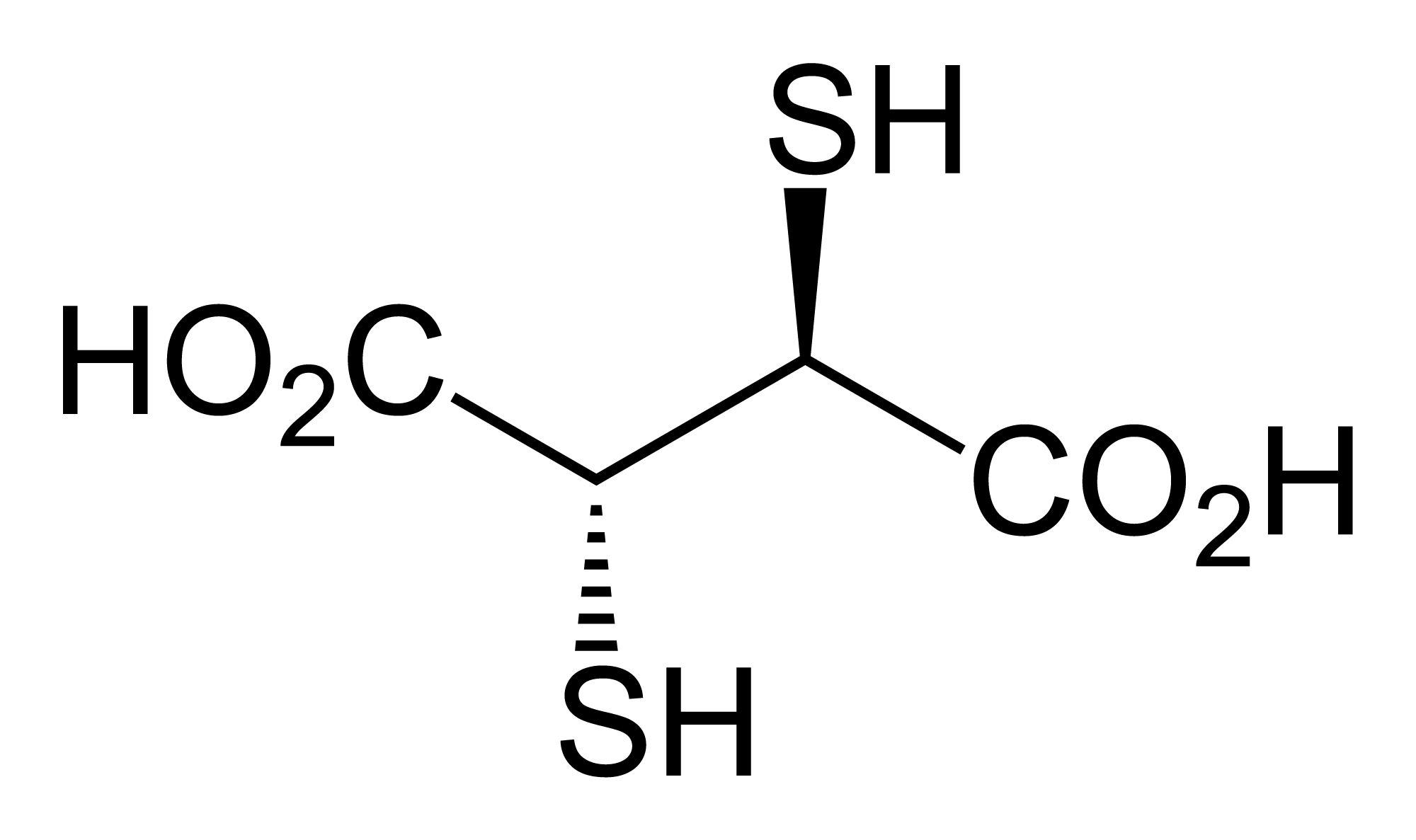
2,3-dimercaptosuccinic acid structure

"Chelating agents are organic compounds which are capable of linking to metal ions". They are usually useful for removing toxic heavy metal ions from body. Dimercaprol is a common chelating agent to treat toxic exposure to arsenic, mercury, gold, and lead. It is in the chelating class of drugs. From Figure 3, the SH-ligands of dimercaprol can compete with -SH groups in natural enzymes for heavy metal, forming a stable metal complex to be excreted through urine. The action antagonises the toxic metal ions and helps remove them from body circulation. However, dimercaprol has a narrow TI and is later replaced by its derivative, 2,3-dimercaptosuccinic acid (DMSA).

==== Neutralising antibodies ====
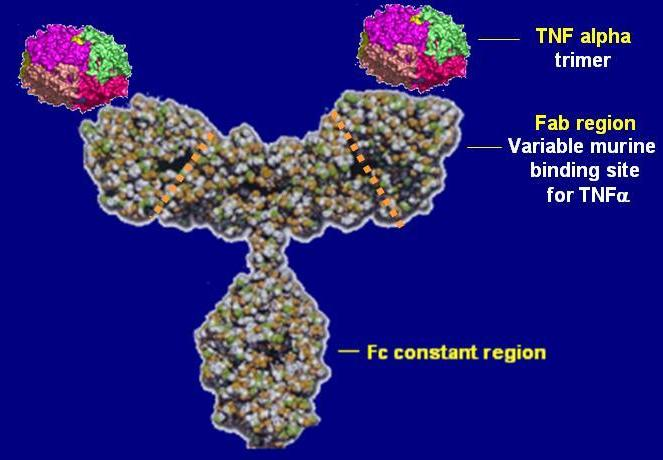
Infliximab binding and inactivating TNF-alpha.

Neutralising antibodies block pathogen entry into cells to prevent further infection and replication. Infliximab is a monoclonal antibody binding with tumour necrosis factor-alpha (TNF-alpha), inhibiting its pro-inflammatory action. Its efficacious anti-inflammatory action is clinically used in Crohn's Disease, active rheumatoid arthritis, psoriatic arthritis, and active ankylosing spondylitis.

==== Salt aggregation ====
Salt aggregation refers to reactions between a drug and an active compound forming a salt. Strongly anionic unfractionated heparin reacts with the positive cationic protamine arginine peptide to generate a salt aggregation. The resulting salt aggregate is not anticoagulant and is inactive. Protamine acts quickly, taking only five minutes to neutralize unfractionated heparin, and its half-life is only ten minutes.

== Pharmacokinetics antagonism ==
=== Mechanism of action ===
A drug which can affect the pharmacokinetics (absorption, digestion, metabolism, excretion) profile of another chemical (or drugs), thereby reducing the action of the target chemical. There could be a rise in the active drug's rate of metabolic breakdown. As an alternative, there may be a decrease in the rate at which the active medication is absorbed from the digestive system or a rise in the rate at which the drug is excreted by the kidneys.

=== Clinical use ===
==== Drugs affecting Absorption: antacid ====
Most drugs are taken orally and are absorbed through the gastrointestinal tract. Antacids would increase the pH environment in the stomach and cause premature release of enteric coated drugs, which are designed to be protected from an acidic environment in stomach. For example, proton-pump inhibitors (PPIs) are enteric coated to protect them from decomposition under an acidic environment. Co-administration of antacids with PPIs would lead to premature release into acidic gastric environments and inactivate PPIs before absorption. These types of pharmacokinetics antagonism should be carefully avoided to prevent loss of drug efficacy.

Since most drugs are either weakly acidic or weakly basic, modified pH would also affect the location at which the drug is deionised, thus affecting the required time for absorption and onset.

==== Drugs affecting metabolism: phenytoin ====
Many drugs are metabolised by a set of liver enzymes called CYP450s. The activity of these enzymes would determine the rate of pro-drug activation and the rate of inactivation of active drugs. For example, warfarin, a commonly used anticoagulant drug in atrial fibrillation, is metabolised by an enzyme called CYP2C9. Phenytoin, a CYP2C9 inducer, would increase its activity and the rate of warfarin breakdown, thereby reducing its efficacy. Patients should avoid the co-administration of warfarin and phenytoin. In cases where both drugs must be used together, warfarin dosing may be titrated up to cope with the reduced efficacy.

==== Drugs affecting excretion: intravenous sodium bicarbonate ====
The kidney excretes most drugs through urine. Since urine is weakly alkaline in nature, weakly acid drugs would ionise in urine, making it difficult for them to be reabsorbed. Therefore, in cases of aspirin (weak acid) toxicity, injecting intravenous sodium bicarbonate could increase urine pH, thereby increasing the excretion of aspirin through urine. A similar approach can be used in other weakly acidic drug toxicity.

== Physiological antagonism ==
=== Mechanism of action ===
Physiologic antagonism refers to the behaviour in which an antagonist behaves the opposite of the agonist but does not bind to the same active site as the agonist does. A physiologic antagonist binds to a different receptor but not the original agonist receptor.

=== Clinical use ===
Both insulin and glucagon are synthesised naturally in the human body to regulate blood glucose levels at homeostasis. Insulin binds to insulin receptors to decrease blood glucose levels, whilst glucagon binds to glucagon receptors to increase blood glucose levels. In cases of insulin-induced hypoglycaemia, glucagon injection could help increase blood glucose levels.

Another example is epinephrine (a bronchodilator) and histamine (a bronchoconstrictor). Epinephrine binds to adrenergic receptors to promote bronchodilation whilst histamine binds to histamine receptors which leads to bronchoconstriction. Since they have opposite effects in different pathways, they are considered physiological antagonists, and they are not advised to be taken together.

== Quantifying effects of antagonists using pharmacodynamics ==
=== Pharmacodynamics ===
Pharmacodynamics (PD) is the core principle of quantifying the effects of antagonists by measuring the drug's efficacy and safety. PD emphasises the relationship between the dose and response of a certain drug, which can be illustrated using a dose-response curve.

==== Efficacy ====
Efficacy is the maximal effect (Emax) that an agonist can produce. As a receptor antagonist does not affect receptors after binding, it is said to have zero efficacy.

A competitive antagonist does not affect the Emax of the agonist. This is because the effect of an agonist can be maximized by adding the dose of the agonist as the action of the antagonist is reversible. The maximum effect of the agonist can be achieved by adding the concentration of the agonist.

A non-competitive antagonist(or Allosteric antagonist) lowers the Emax of an agonist. The Emax of an agonist is inversely proportional to the concentration of the antagonist, which means a higher concentration of antagonist results in a lower Emax. The maximal efficacy of agonists is reduced as the inhibition cannot be reversed by adding the agonist concentration.

==== Potency ====
Potency is the amount of drug needed to give a certain therapeutic effect. It is affected by the drug's affinity to the receptors and the number of receptors available. For antagonists, half maximal inhibitory concentration (IC50) is used to measure the potency of antagonists. IC50 means the concentration of antagonist needed to give a 50% inhibition. It can be directly compared with EC50, which is commonly used to measure the potency of an agonist. EC50 means the concentration of agonist needed to give a 50% response.

IC50 is significant in determining the optimal dose of antagonist. A high concentration of an antagonist in the body may result in toxicity in the cell and damage the cell membrane. A lower IC50 means the inhibitory effect can be met with a lower concentration of antagonist and, therefore a lower risk of toxicity. For example, the IC50 of antagonists on cancer cell growth is essential for determining the optimal dose which inhibits cancer cells while inducing less harmful systemic effects in the body.

==== Therapeutic index ====
The therapeutic index (TI) is used to quantify the risks and benefits of a certain drug. It describes the relationship between toxic dose and minimum effective dose, thus providing an important insight into the safety of a drug. The Therapeutic Index is calculated using the following equation:

TI = TD50 / ED50, where TD50 is the dose at which toxicity presents in 50% of the population, and ED50 is the dose needed to produce 50% of maximal response. From the equation, a high TI indicates that the drug needs a high dose to induce toxicity in 50% of the population or a low dose to achieve the minimum effective dose, and vice versa.

In the case of physiological antagonists, for example, insulin has a narrow TI. A narrow TI indicates that either excess or lack of insulin can cause significant risks. On one hand, lack of insulin may result in high blood glucose levels and kidney or cardiovascular damage. On the other hand, excess insulin may result in insulin-induced hypoglycemia as aforementioned. Another example is dimercaprol, a chemical antagonist in treating metal toxicity. Dimercaprol has a narrow TI so it is replaced by its derivative, 2,3-dimercaptosuccinic acid (DMSA).

=== Upregulation of receptors in functional antagonists ===
Upregulation of receptors is the increase in receptor number or sensitivity of receptors. The receptors involved in functional antagonism are regulated in sensitivity, number and location. Therefore, changes in receptors are common. Using a long-term antagonist drug or continuous exposure to an antagonist may cause the upregulation and hypersensitivity of receptors, which means an increase in the number and sensitivity of receptors. The increase in the number of receptors is due to the increased expression of receptors after prolonged inhibition. The upregulation of receptors is important in the clinical aspect.

One example of upregulation of receptors is the upregulation of β-receptors caused by β receptor antagonists (also called β-blocker). The prolonged use of β-blockers results in the blockade of β-receptors, causing cells (mainly myocardial cells) to increase their expression of β-receptor. After removing the blockage, more receptors available for stimulation, resulting in higher sensitivity of β-receptors called the hypersensitivity of β-receptors. Abrupt discontinuation of β-blocker may potentially aggravate coronary artery disease, tachycardia, or even sudden cardiac death. Therefore, to prevent the adverse effects, doses of β-blocker must be reduced gradually over 10–14 days.

== Antidotes ==
Antidotes are agents that can neutralise the effects of a poison or toxin. Antidotes counteract the effects of toxins in many ways, such as by blocking the absorption of the toxin, binding and neutralising the poison, opposing the toxin's end-organ function, or blocking the toxin's conversion to more hazardous metabolites. In addition to lowering the amount of free or active poison present, antidote delivery may also lessen the toxin's effects on organs through competitive inhibition, receptor blockage, or direct antagonistic interaction.

The therapeutic index or ratio (TD50/ED50), which is the ratio of the toxic dosage (TD) or fatal dose (LD) to the effective dose (ED), determines the level of safety associated with a substance.

=== Mechanism of action ===
==== Decrease the active toxin level ====
Agents that "bind" to the toxin can reduce free or active toxin present. It is possible for this binding to be nonspecific or specific.

Activated charcoal is the non-specific binding agent most frequently utilised as it has strong adsorption capacity and could prevent the toxin's enterohepatic recirculation. Chelation agents, immunotherapy, and bioscavenger therapy are examples of specific binders. Urinary alkalization or hemadsorption may improve elimination in some circumstances.

==== Block the site of action of the toxin ====
It might occur either at the enzyme or receptor level. There are two possible outcomes at the enzyme level: competitive inhibition or enzyme activity reactivation. Ethyl alcohol or fomepizole used in methyl alcohol or ethylene glycol poisoning is a typical example of competitive enzyme inhibition. By posing competition for alcohol dehydrogenase (ADH) with methyl alcohol and ethylene glycol, these drugs reduce the production of harmful metabolites. For receptor level, the traditional antidotes include naloxone and flumazenil. Flumazenil functions as a competitive antagonist at the GABA-A receptor complex's benzodiazepine site. By doing this, the CNS and respiratory depression would reverse and the inward chloride current would reduce. Flumazenil is useful in treating and preventing benzodiazepine-induced coma from recurring.

==== Decreasing the toxic metabolite ====
Antidotes can be employed to either mop up hazardous metabolites or change them into less toxic forms once they have developed. Hepatic glutathione stores are replenished by N-acetyl cysteine, and this process is what leads to the conjugation of the poisonous metabolite N-acetyl P-benzoquinone imine (NAPQI).

== See also ==
- Receptor antagonist
- Receptor
- Dose–response relationship
- Pharmacodynamics
- Antidotes
