= Protagonist (disambiguation) =

A protagonist is the leading actor or the principal character in a story whose fate is most closely followed by the reader or audience.

Protagonist may also refer to:

- Protagonist (film), a 2007 documentary written and directed by Jessica Yu
- Der Protagonist, a 1926 opera by Kurt Weill with libretto by Georg Kaiser
- The Protagonists (1968 film), an Italian film directed by Marcello Fondato
- The Protagonists (1999 film), an Italian film directed by Luca Guadagnino
- The Protagonist, the alias of the otherwise nameless main character in Tenet (film)
- Protagonists, a 2023 album by post-punk band Ist Ist

== See also ==
- Agonist (disambiguation)
- Antagonist (disambiguation)
- Kathanayakudu (disambiguation)
- Katha Nayagan (disambiguation)
