= Agon (motorcycle) =

- Production: 1924–1928
- Class: Motorcycle
- Engine: 173–996 cc Paque, Bradshaw, and JAP

Manufactured in Germany between 1924 and 1928, the Agon line of motorcycles featured a wide range of engine engine sizes from 173 cc up to 996 cc from engine manufacturers such as Paque, Bradshaw and JAP.
