= Protosquillidae =

Scientific classification
- Kingdom: Animalia
- Phylum: Arthropoda
- Clade: Pancrustacea
- Class: Malacostraca
- Order: Stomatopoda
- Superfamily: Gonodactyloidea
- Family: Protosquillidae; Manning, 1980

Family of crustaceans

Protosquillidae is a family of mantis shrimp. It contains the following genera:

- Chorisquilla Manning, 1969
- Echinosquilla Manning, 1969
- Haptosquilla Manning, 1969
- Protosquilla Brooks, 1886
- Rayellus Ahyong, 2010
- Siamosquilla Naiyanetr, 1989
