= Villon =

Villon may refer to:

- Villon (surname), a French surname
- Villon, Yonne, Burgundy, France
- 10140 Villon, a main belt asteroid, named after François Villon
