= Agon (newspaper) =

Newspaper in Albania

- Founded: 2007; 18 years ago
- Political alignment: Independent
- Language: Albanian
- Headquarters: Tirana
- Website: Agon

Agon is a newspaper published in Albania and based in Tirana. The paper was launched in 2007 as a free daily, being the first in its category.
