= Villon (surname) =

Villon is a French surname. Notable people with the surname include:

- François Villon (circa 1431–1463), poet
- Jacques Villon (1875–1963), painter
- Raymond Duchamp-Villon (1876–1918), sculptor, brother of Jacques Villon
- Pierre Villon (1901–1980), French Communist Party member
