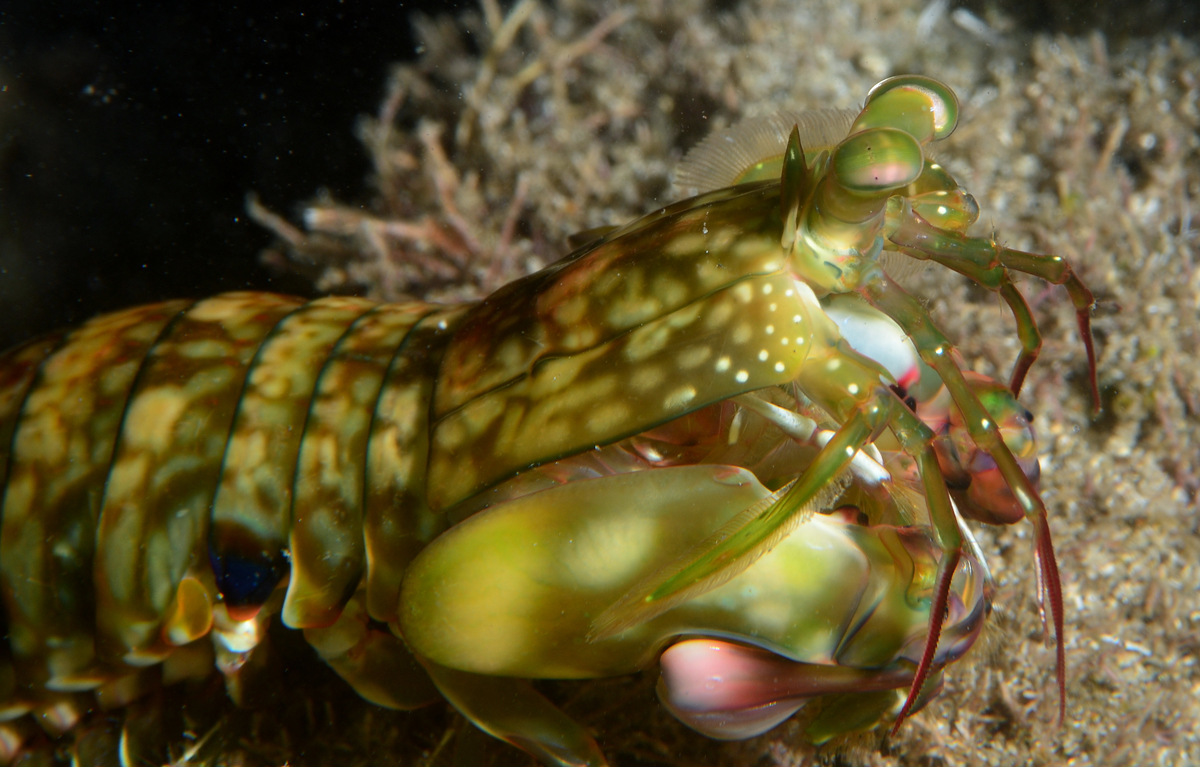
- Gonodactylus platysoma

Scientific classification
- Domain: Eukaryota
- Kingdom: Animalia
- Phylum: Arthropoda
- Class: Malacostraca
- Order: Stomatopoda
- Family: Gonodactylidae
- Genus: Gonodactylus; Berthold, 1827

= Gonodactylus =

Genus of crustaceans

Gonodactylus is a genus of mantis shrimp, containing the following species:

- Gonodactylus acutirostris de Man, 1898
- Gonodactylus botti Manning, 1975
- Gonodactylus childi Manning, 1971
- Gonodactylus chiragra (Fabricius, 1781)
- Gonodactylus platysoma Wood-Mason, 1895
- Gonodactylus smithii Pocock, 1893
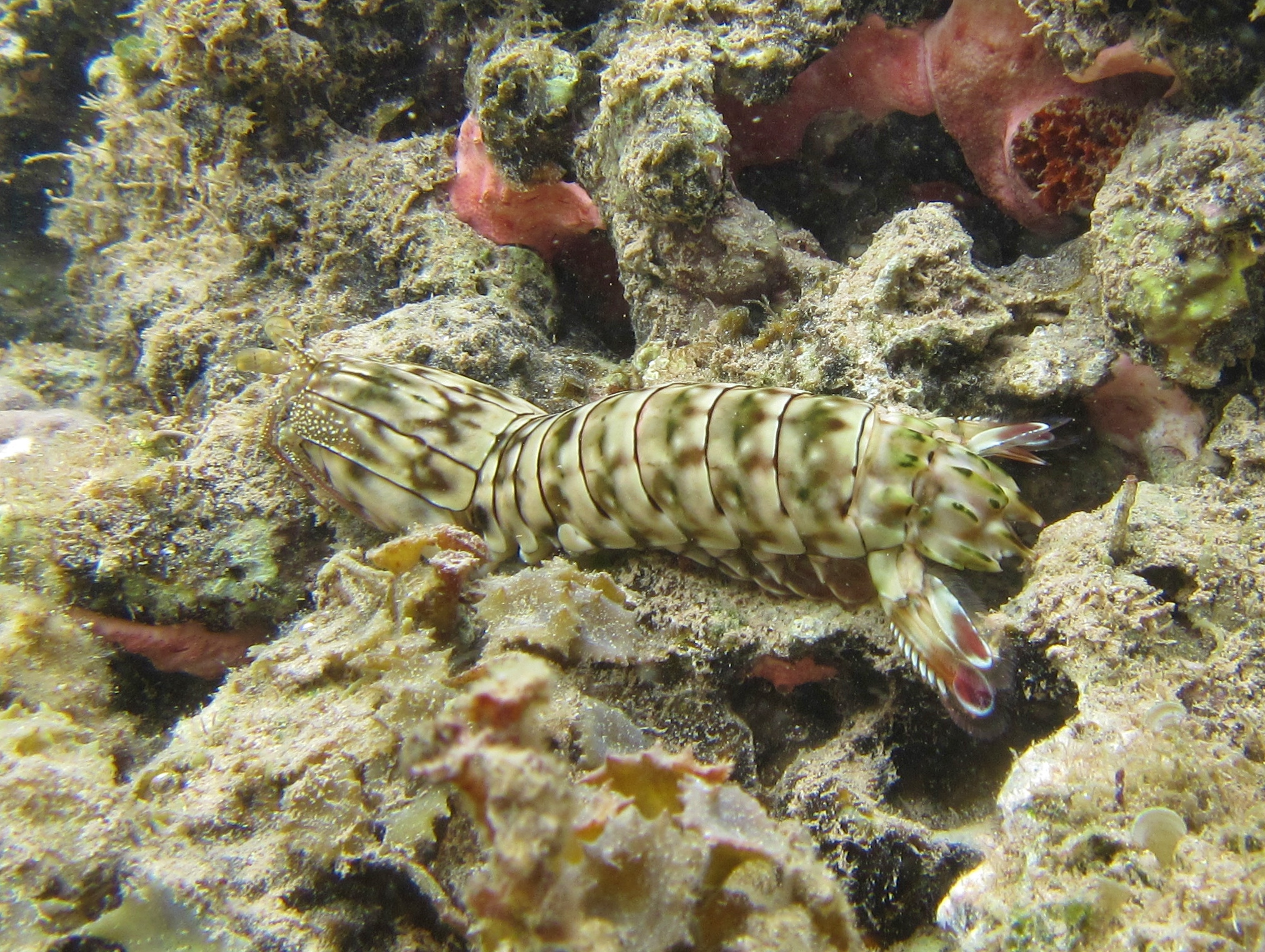
Gonodactylus chiragra

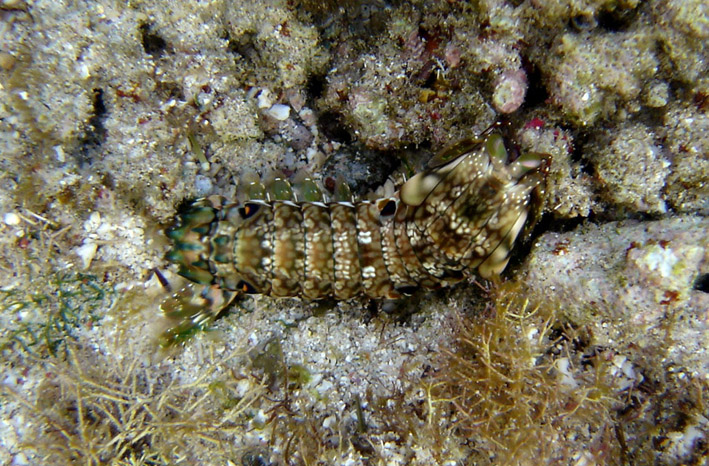
Gonodactylus platysoma
