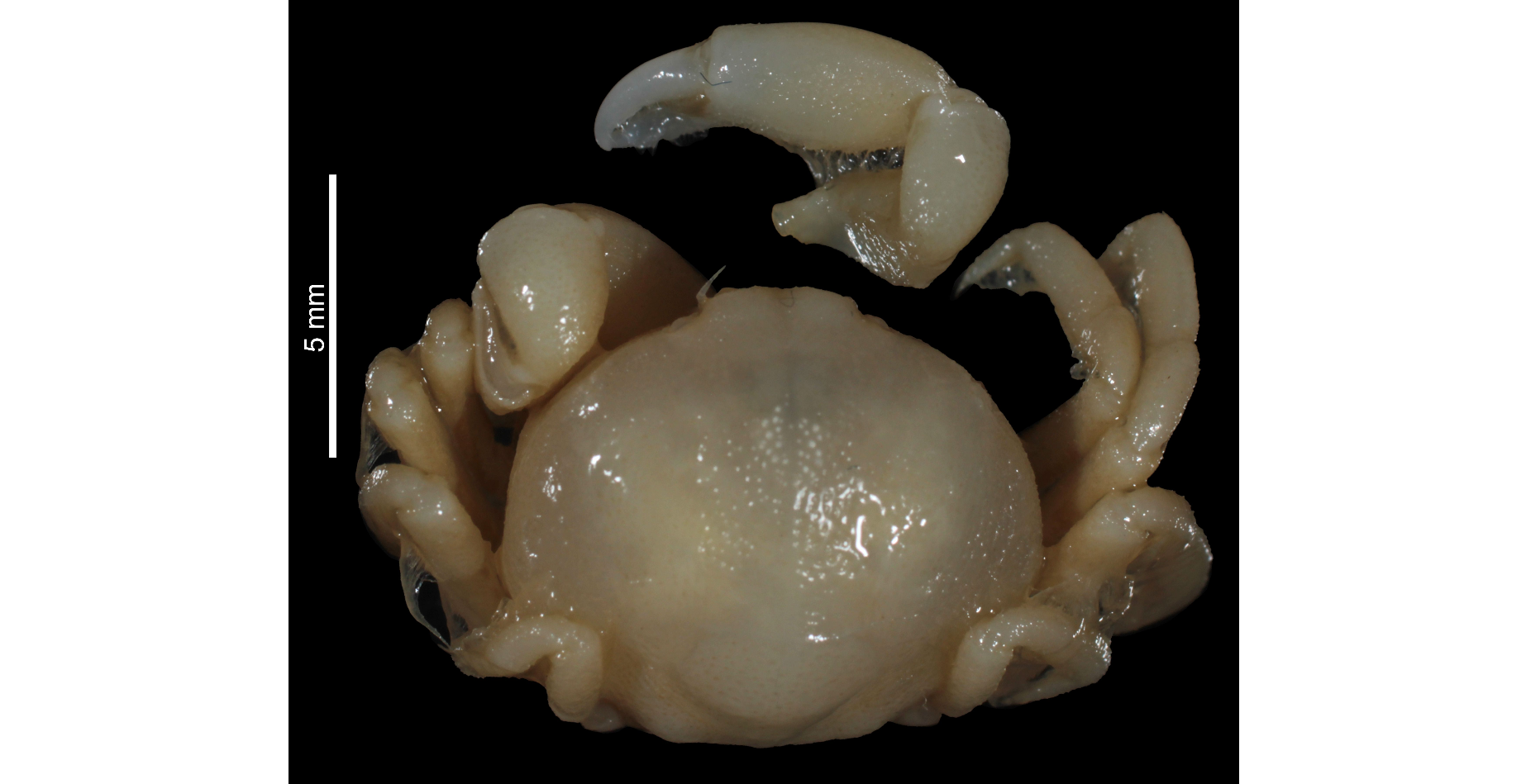

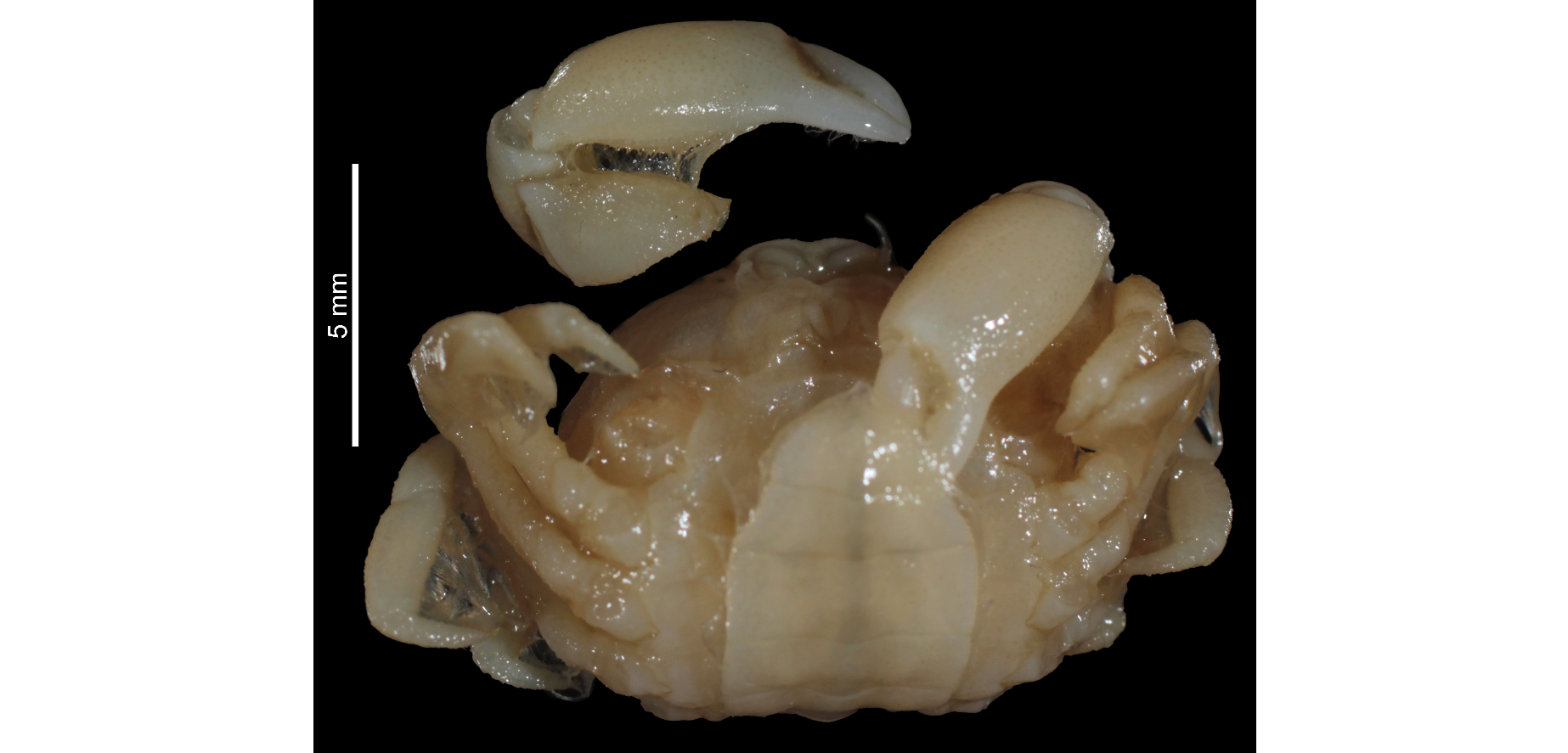
- Alain crosnieri:holotype MNHN

Scientific classification
- Kingdom: Animalia
- Phylum: Arthropoda
- Class: Malacostraca
- Order: Decapoda
- Suborder: Pleocyemata
- Infraorder: Brachyura
- Family: Pinnotheridae
- Genus: Alain; Manning, 1998

= Alain (crab) =

Genus of crabs

Alain is a genus of crabs belonging to the family Pinnotheridae, and was first described in 1998 by Raymond Manning. The type species of this genus (Alain crosnieri) was collected in Indonesian territorial waters.

== Species ==
Species listed at WoRMS are:

- Alain crosnieri Manning, 1998
- Alain raymondi Ahyong, 2008
