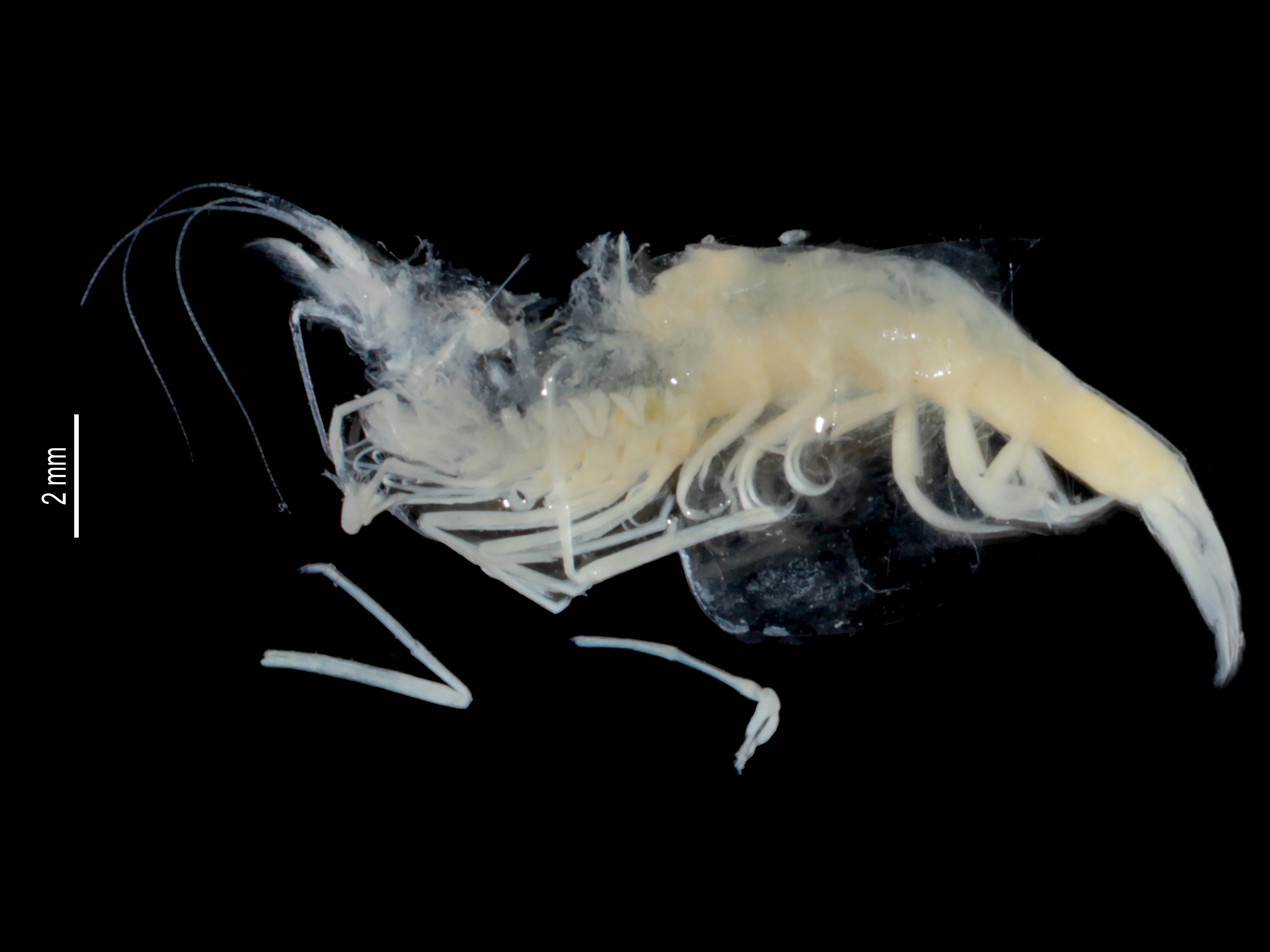
- Typhlatya arfeae

Scientific classification
- Kingdom: Animalia
- Phylum: Arthropoda
- Class: Malacostraca
- Order: Decapoda
- Suborder: Pleocyemata
- Infraorder: Caridea
- Family: Atyidae
- Genus: Typhlatya; Creaser, 1936

= Typhlatya =

Species of crustacean

Typhlatya is a genus of shrimp in the family Atyidae. These are small, stygobitic shrimp found in the West Mediterranean region (France and Spain), Caribbean region (the Antilles, Bahamas and Yucatán), Ascension Island and the Galápagos, although the individual species often have very small ranges. Species in this genus are found in salt, brackish and fresh waters, mostly in anchialine habitats and none in the open sea.

== Taxonomy, species and conservation ==
There are currently 17 recognized species, of which one is listed by the IUCN as critically endangered (marked "CR" below), and six are considered vulnerable (marked "VU"). Phylogenetic studies indicate that the genus as presently defined is paraphyletic and needs to be redefined, as T. galapagensis clusters with the widespread Antecaridina and T. monae likely with the Australian Stygiocaris. On a higher level, these three genera, together with Halocaridina and Halocaridinides, form a group. In addition to the species below, "Typhlatya" jusbaschjani (Georgia) and "Typhlatya" pretneri (Hercegovina) have been listed in this genus, but the former is a species inquirenda and recent authorities generally include the latter in Troglocaris.

- Typhlatya arfeae Jaume & Bréhier, 2005 – France
- Typhlatya campecheae H. H. Hobbs III & H. H. Hobbs Jr., 1976 – Yucatán Peninsula
- Typhlatya consobrina Botoşăneanu & Holthuis, 1970 – Cuba
- Typhlatya dzilamensis Alvarez, Iliffe & Villalobos, 2005 – Yucatán Peninsula
- Typhlatya elenae Juarrero, 1994 – Cuba
- Typhlatya galapagensis Monod & Cals, 1970 – Galápagos Islands
- Typhlatya garciadebrasi Juarrero de Varona & Ortiz, 2000 – Cuba
- Typhlatya garciai Chace, 1942 – Cuba and possibly Caicos Island
- Typhlatya iliffei C. W. J. Hart & Manning, 1981 – Bermuda
- Typhlatya kakuki Alvarez, Iliffe & Villalobos, 2005 – Bahamas
- Typhlatya miravetensis Sanz & Platvoet, 1995 – Spain
- Typhlatya mitchelli H. H. Hobbs III & H. H. Hobbs Jr., 1976 – Yucatán Peninsula
- Typhlatya monae Chace, 1954 – widely across Caribbean islands
- Typhlatya pearsei Creaser, 1936 – Yucatán Peninsula
- Typhlatya rogersi Chace & Manning, 1972 – Ascension Island
- Typhlatya taina Estrada & Gómez, 1987 – Cuba
- Typhlatya utilaensis Alvarez, Iliffe & Villalobos, 2005 – Utila Island
