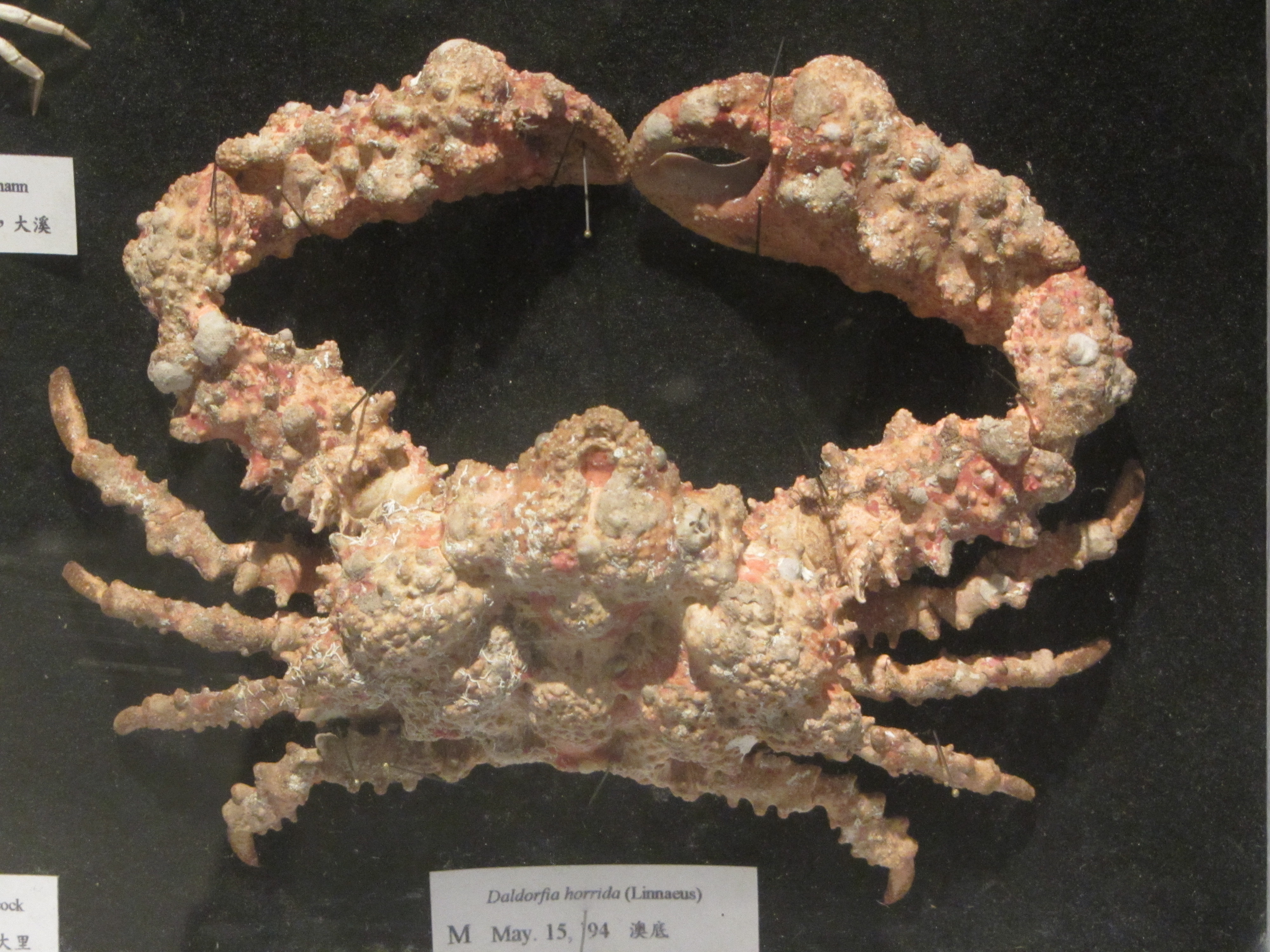

Scientific classification
- Kingdom: Animalia
- Phylum: Arthropoda
- Class: Malacostraca
- Order: Decapoda
- Suborder: Pleocyemata
- Infraorder: Brachyura
- Family: Parthenopidae
- Genus: Daldorfia
- Species: D. horrida

Binomial name
- Daldorfia horrida (Linnaeus, 1758)

Synonyms
- Cancer horridus Linnaeus, 1758

= Daldorfia horrida =

Species of crab

Daldorfia horrida, the horrid elbow crab, is a species of elbow crab in the family Parthenopidae. It is native to tropical and subtropical waters of the Indo-Pacific.

== Taxonomy ==
Daldorfia horrida was originally classified by Carl Linnaeus as Cancer horridus in 1758. It was subsequently moved to the genus Daldorfia in 1904.

== Description ==
Daldorfia horrida is a medium-sized species of crab with a carapace approximately 12 centimetres (4.7 in) in diameter. It utilises camouflage, as its carapace resembles a rock, which allows it to avoid predators in its natural environment. In addition to this, the carapace is roughly shaped like a pentagon, and covered in spines. The pincers are unequal in size and double the length of the carapace.
