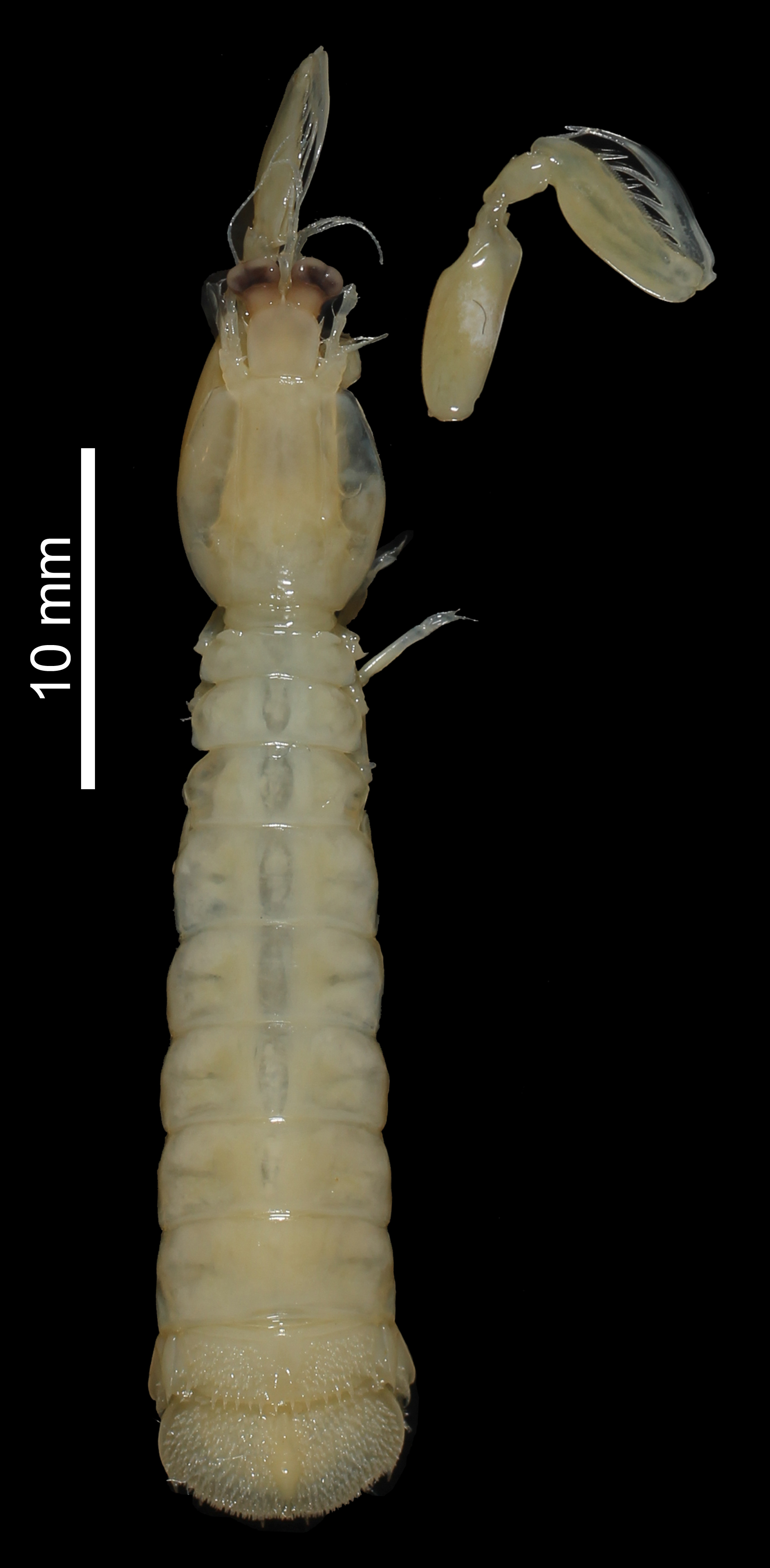
- Paracoridon johrae

Scientific classification
- Kingdom: Animalia
- Phylum: Arthropoda
- Clade: Pancrustacea
- Class: Malacostraca
- Order: Stomatopoda
- Suborder: Unipeltata
- Superfamily: Erythrosquilloidea; Manning & Bruce, 1984
- Family: Erythrosquillidae; Manning & Bruce, 1984
- Genus: Erythrosquilla; Manning & Bruce, 1984

Species
- Erythrosquilla hamano Erythrosquilla megalops

= Erythrosquilla =

Genus of crustaceans

Erythrosquilla is a genus of mantis shrimp, placed in its own family (Erythrosquillidae) and superfamily (Erythrosquilloidea) comprising two species:

- Erythrosquilla hamano Ahyong, 2001
- Erythrosquilla megalops Manning & Bruce, 1984

The family is distinguished from other stomatopod families by the presence of a ridge on the mid-line of the telson.

== Erythrosquilla megalops ==
E. megalops is only known from the waters off Somalia, in the Indian Ocean, which gives rise to the generic name (Mare Erythraeum being an old name for the Indian Ocean). The raptorial claws each have five teeth, rather than the 8–9 seen in E. hamano.

== Erythrosquilla hamano ==
E. hamano is known from Japanese waters in the East China Sea and around Rottnest Island, Australia. This apparently disjunct distribution is also known in the parasquillid mantis shrimp Pseudosquillopsis dofleini. Among the differences between it and E. megalops, the most obvious is that it has more teeth on the raptorial claw than E. megalops.
