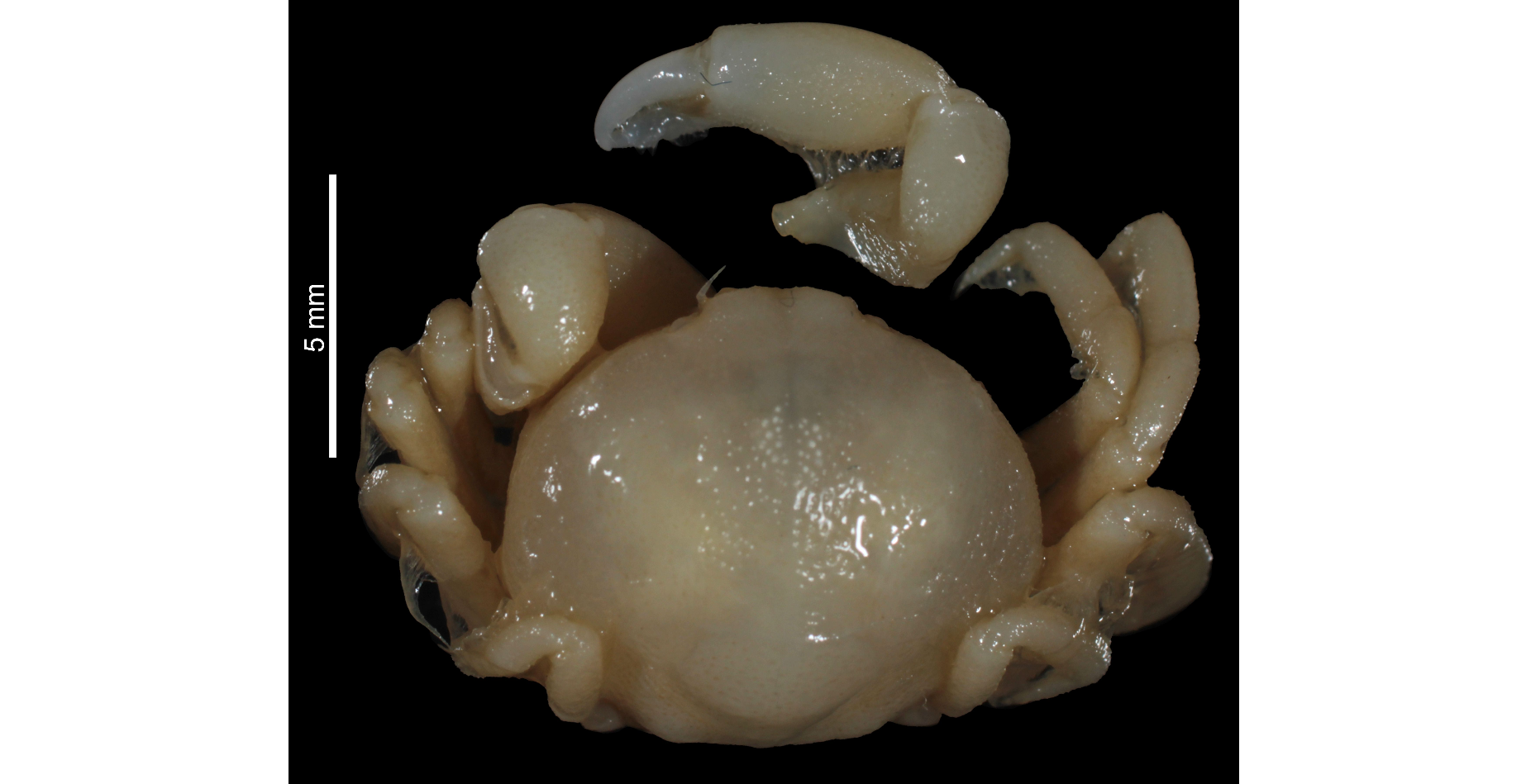

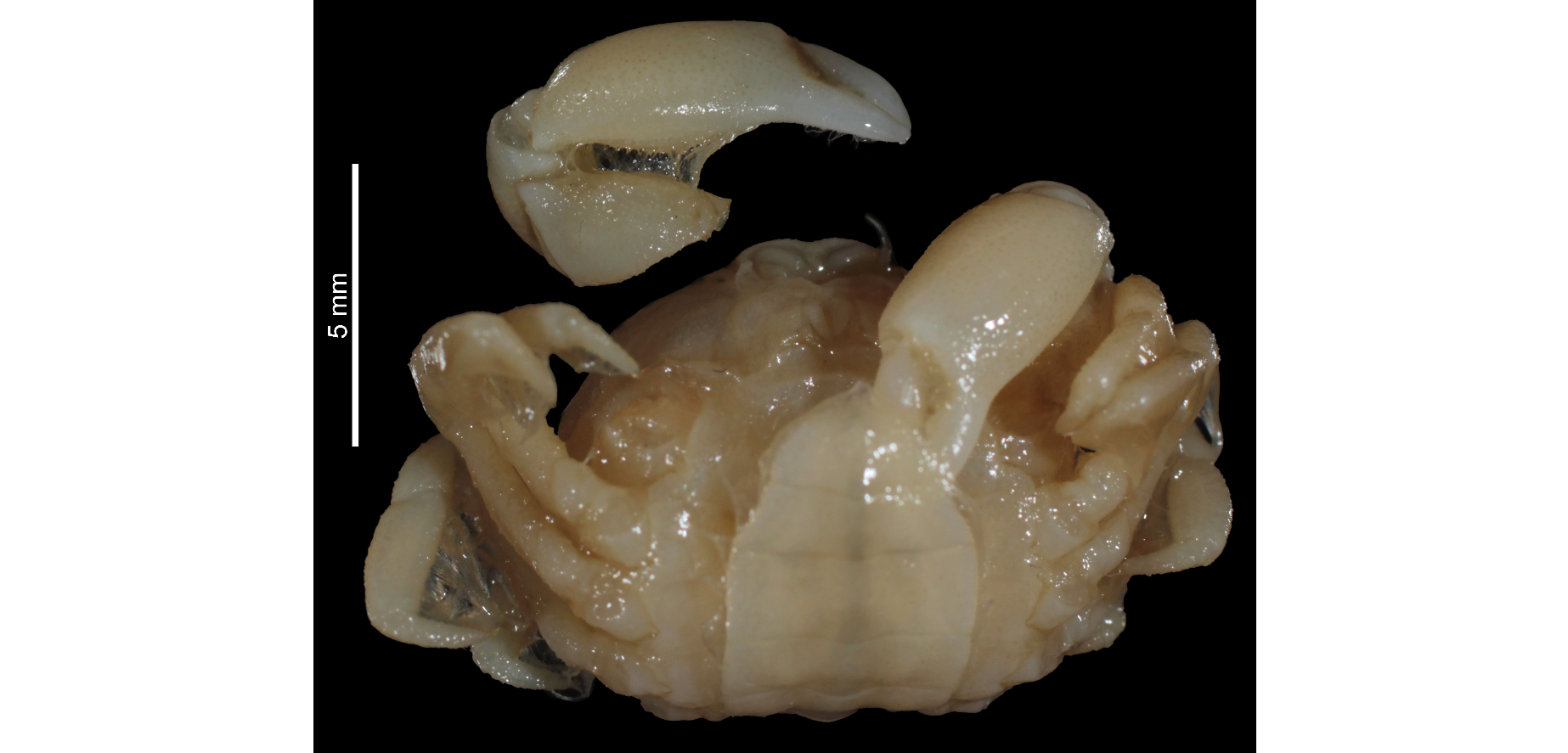
- holotype MNHN

Scientific classification
- Kingdom: Animalia
- Phylum: Arthropoda
- Class: Malacostraca
- Order: Decapoda
- Suborder: Pleocyemata
- Infraorder: Brachyura
- Family: Pinnotheridae
- Genus: Alain
- Species: A. crosnieri

Binomial name
- Alain crosnieri Manning, 1998

= Alain crosnieri =

Genus of crabs

Holotype site: Iles Tanimbar'"`UNIQ--ref-00000008-QINU`"'

Alain crosnieri is a species of crab in the family Pinnotheridae, and was first described in 1998 by Raymond Manning. This crab is found in Indonesian territorial waters.
