= Typhlatya monae =

Conservation status
- Least Concern (IUCN 3.1)

Scientific classification
- Kingdom: Animalia
- Phylum: Arthropoda
- Class: Malacostraca
- Order: Decapoda
- Suborder: Pleocyemata
- Infraorder: Caridea
- Family: Atyidae
- Genus: Typhlatya
- Species: T. monae

Binomial name
- Typhlatya monae Chace, 1954

Species of crustacean

Typhlatya monae is a species of basket shrimp in the family Atyidae. It is found in the Caribbean and Africa.

The IUCN conservation status of Typhlatya monae is "LC", least concern, with no immediate threat to the species' survival. The IUCN status was reviewed in 2013.
