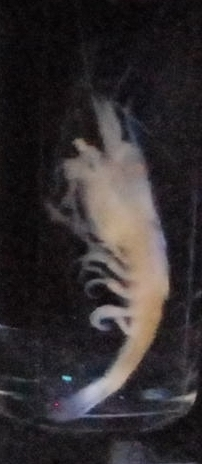
- Troglocaris anophthalmus

Scientific classification
- Domain: Eukaryota
- Kingdom: Animalia
- Phylum: Arthropoda
- Class: Malacostraca
- Order: Decapoda
- Suborder: Pleocyemata
- Infraorder: Caridea
- Family: Atyidae
- Genus: Troglocaris; Dormitzer, 1853

Type species
- Palaemon anophthalmus Kollar, 1848

= Troglocaris =

Genus of crustaceans

Troglocaris is a genus of freshwater shrimp in the family Atyidae. These stygobitic, whitish and eyeless shrimp are found in Southern Europe (Dinaric Alps and West Caucasus). Although locally very common, the small ranges of the individual species make them highly vulnerable to habitat loss, for example by water extraction. Their underground habitat is often extremely stable; for example, the Vipavska jama cave in Slovenia is home to a population of T. anophthalmus, and its water only varies from 10 °C (50 °F) in the winter to 11 °C (52 °F) in the summer. In some Dinaric caves, notably Vjetrenica, as many as three species may occur together.

These shrimp sometimes fall prey to olm salamanders, but are able to survive injuries if the attack fails. The Dinaric Troglocaris are the main host of several species of parasitic or epizoic flatworms of the family Scutariellidae (order Temnocephalida).

== Species ==
Troglocaris currently contains 15 described species, but there are also a number of undescribed species. Gallocaris inermis, a stygobitic shrimp from southern France, was formerly included in Troglocaris.

Subgenus Troglocaris

- Troglocaris anophthalmus (Kollar, 1848)
- Troglocaris bosnica Sket & Zakšek, 2009
- Troglocaris planinensis Birštejn, 1948

Subgenus Xiphocaridinella

- Troglocaris ablaskiri Birštejn, 1939
- Troglocaris birsteini Mugue, Zueva & Ershov, 2001
- Troglocaris fagei Birštejn, 1939
- Troglocaris jusbaschjani Birštejn, 1948
- Troglocaris kutaissiana (Sadovskij, 1930)
- Troglocaris osterloffi Juzbaš'jan, 1940
- Troglocaris otapi Marin, 2018

Subgenus Troglocaridella

- Troglocaris hercegovinensis (Babić, 1922)

Subgenus Spelaeocaris

- Troglocaris kapellana Sket & Zakšek, 2009
- Troglocaris neglecta Sket & Zakšek, 2009
- Troglocaris prasence Sket & Zakšek, 2009
- Troglocaris pretneri (Matjašič, 1956)

== See also ==
- Typhlatya – the only other atyid shrimp from subterranean habitats in Europe
- Typhlocaris – the only non-atyid shrimp from subterranean habitats in Europe
