= Waiʻanapanapa State Park =

State park in Hana, Maui, Hawaii

- Black Sand Beach (informally)
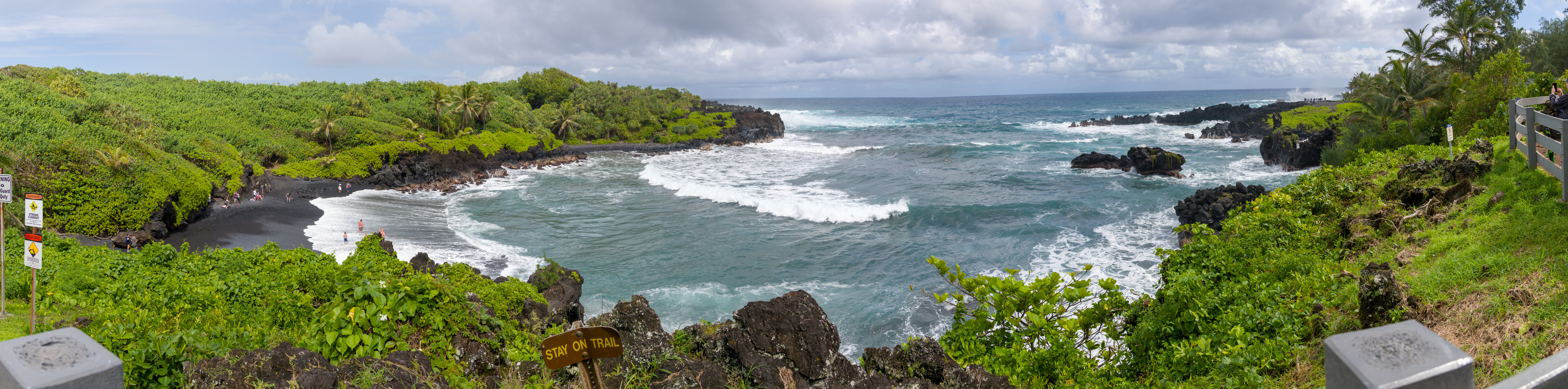
- Panoramic view of Wai'anapanapa State Park

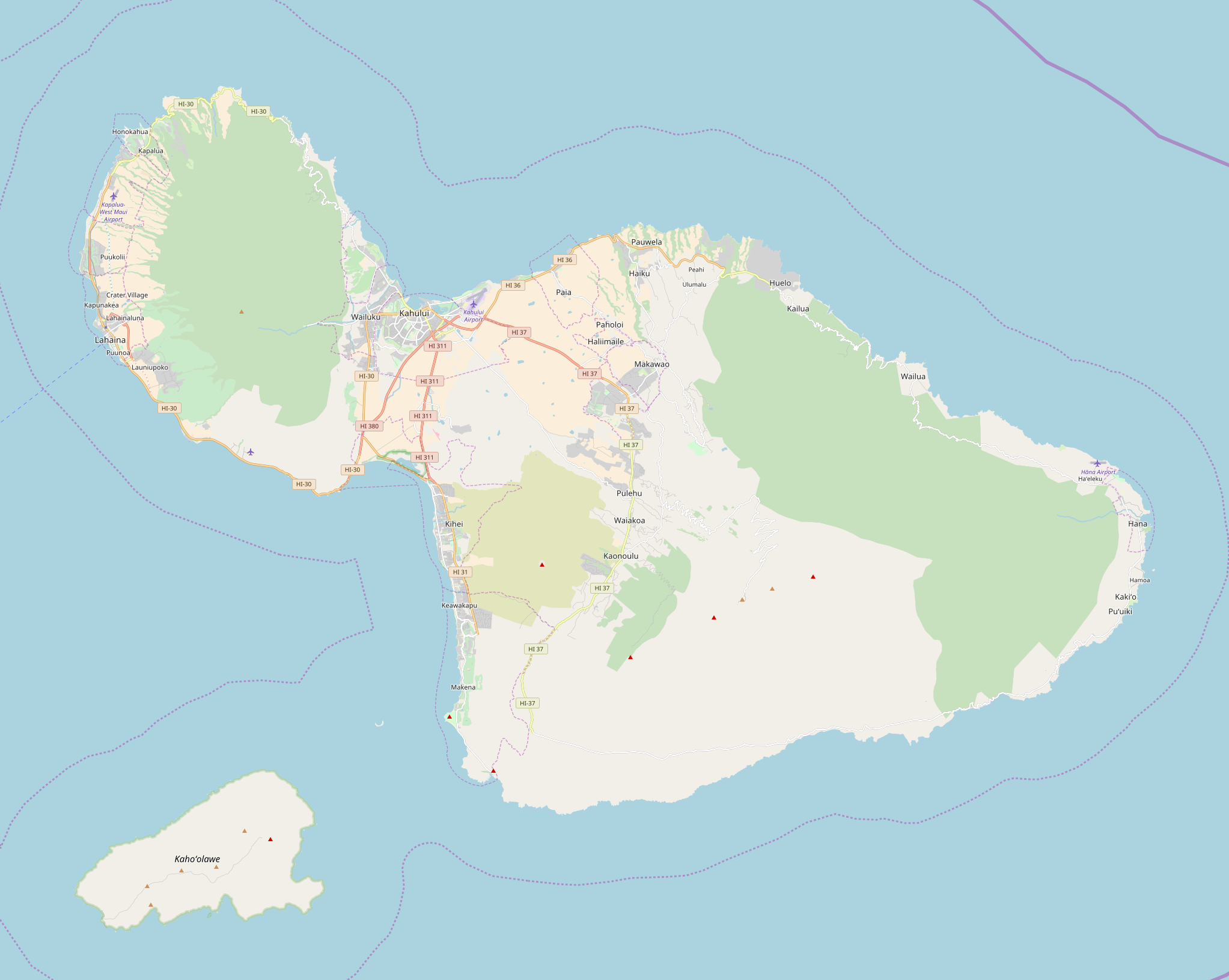
- Location within Maui Location within Hawaii
- Location: Hawaii, U.S.
- Nearest city: Hana, Hawaii
- Coordinates: 20°47′8.93″N 155°59′8.35″W
- Area: 122 acres (49 ha)
- Governing body: Hawai'i Department of Land and Natural Resources

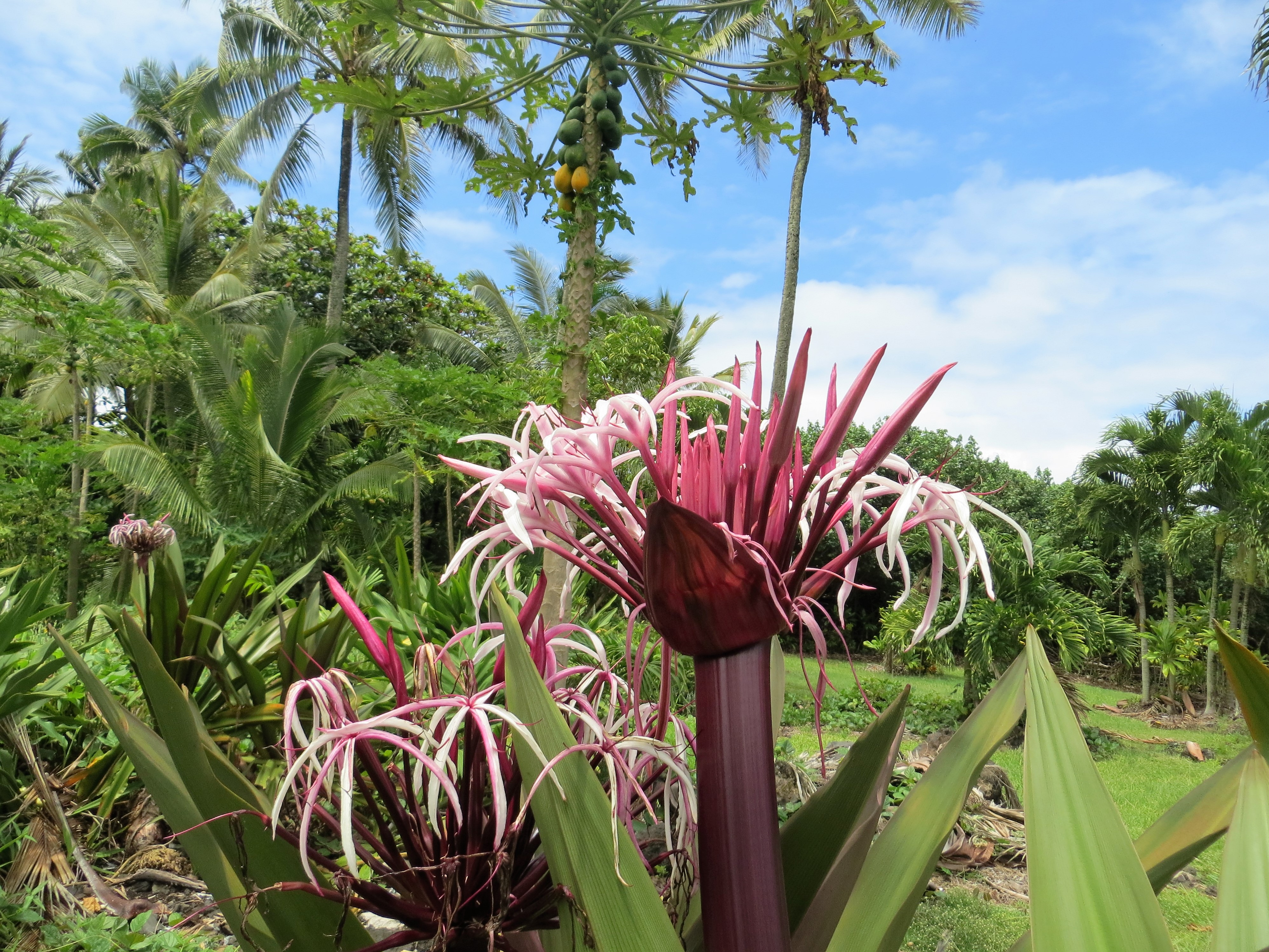
Florals at the Wai'anapanapa State Park in Hana, Maui, Hawaii.

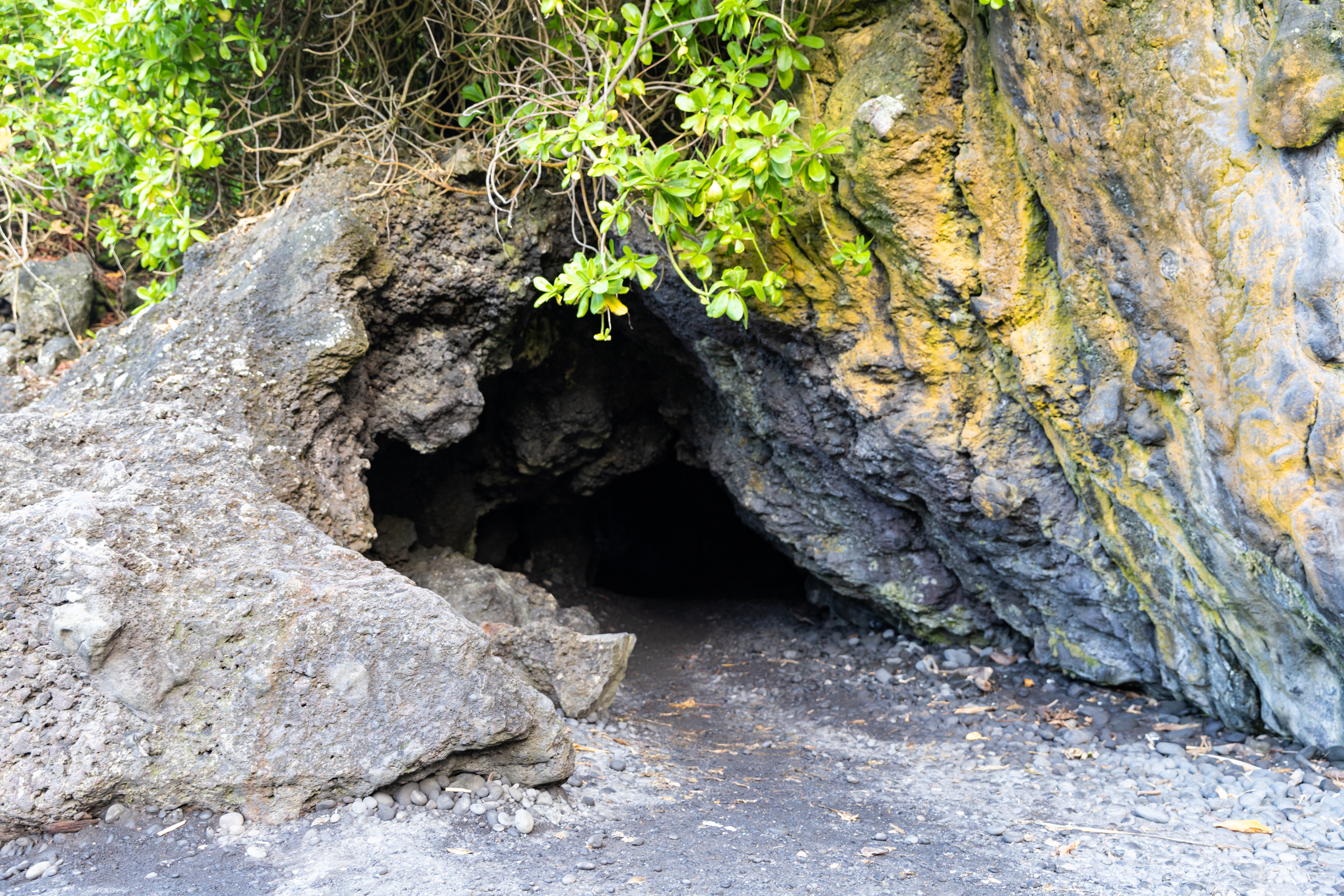
Waianapanapa black sand beach with a Lava tube on Maui, Hawaii

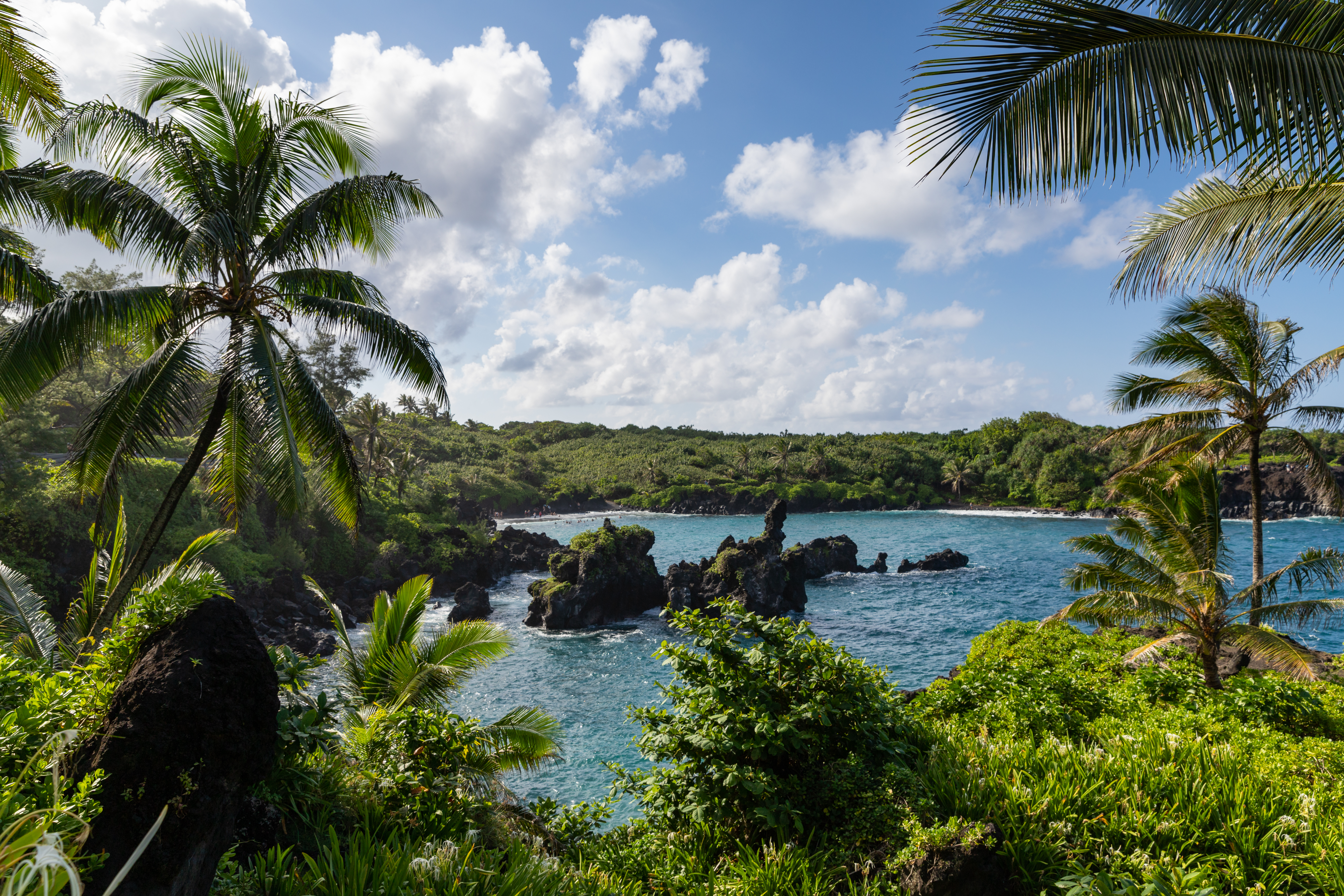
Waianapanapa State Park on Maui, Hawaii

Waiʻanapanapa State Park is a 122-acre (0.49 km^{2}) state park in Hana, on the island of Maui, in Hawaii. It is located at the end of Waiʻanapanapa Road off Hana Highway at mile marker 32, 53 miles (85 km) east of Kahului, Maui. Waiʻanapanapa means "glistening fresh water" in the Hawaiian language, referring to nearby fresh water streams and sparkling pools. The camp offers camping facilities, including a small lawn where campers may pitch a tent, and a public bathroom nearby.

The anchialine tide pools at the park turn red several times a year due to the arrival of shrimp species like Halocaridina rubra (ʻōpaeʻula) and Metabetaeus lohena. Local folklore says it is the blood of Popoaleae, a mythical princess who was murdered in a nearby lava tube cave by her husband, Chief Kaʻakea.

== Natural features ==
The black volcanic sand beach is a highlight at this state park in Maui, Hawaii, but there's plenty more to see, including freshwater caves, water tubes, anchialine pools, and a natural stone arch. Wildlife is abundant, and on any given day you might see an incredible seabird colony or watch the park's tide pools turn crimson with the arrival of thousands of tiny shrimp. — National Geographic

Waiʻanapanapa State Park's natural features include:

- seabird colonies
- anchialine pools
- native hala (Pandanus tectorius)
- coastal mesic forests
- lava tubes
- heiau (religious temples)
- a natural arch
- sea stacks
- blowholes
- a small black sand beach.
- anchialine shrimp

== See also ==
Views of Wai'anapanapa State Park

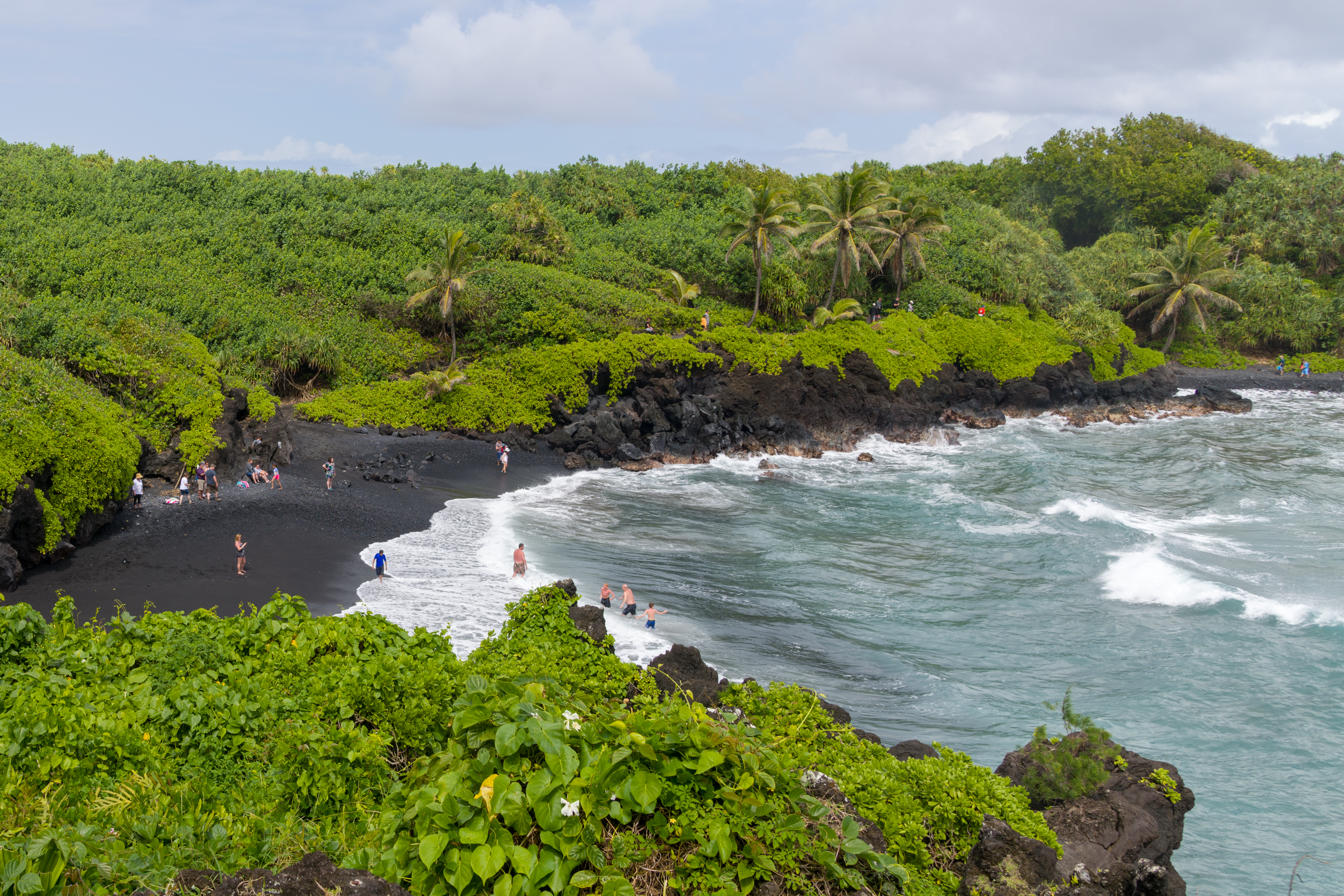
Black sand beach

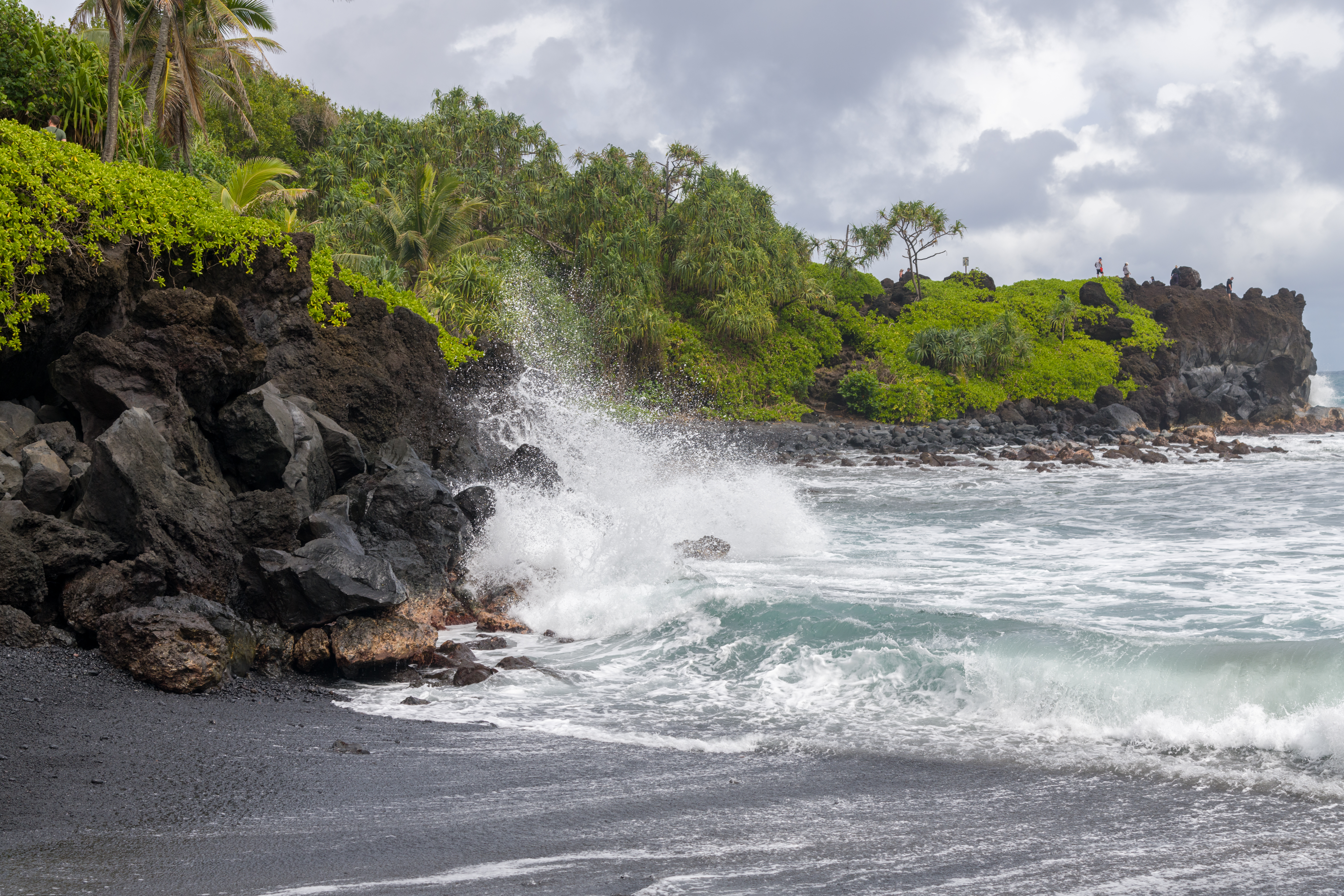
Crashing wave and vegetation

- List of Hawaii state parks
