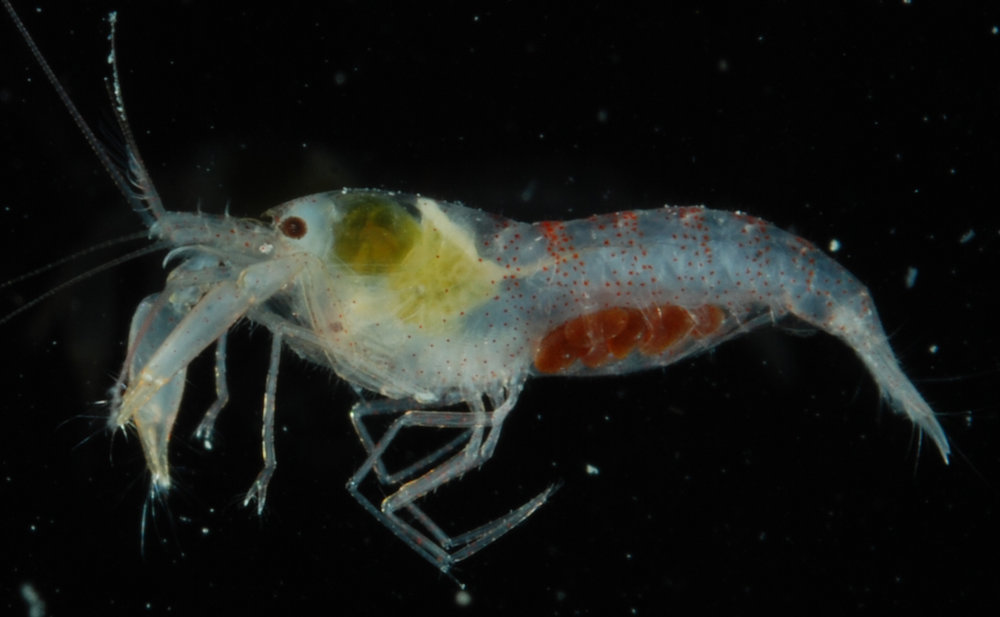

Scientific classification
- Kingdom: Animalia
- Phylum: Arthropoda
- Class: Malacostraca
- Order: Decapoda
- Suborder: Pleocyemata
- Infraorder: Caridea
- Family: Alpheidae
- Genus: Metabetaeus
- Species: M. mcphersonae

Binomial name
- Metabetaeus mcphersonae Anker, 2010

= Metabetaeus mcphersonae =

Species of alpheid shrimp

Metabetaeus mcphersonae is a marine species of alpheid shrimp native to French Polynesia. The species has only been recorded to live in coral reef habitats off the coast of Moorea of the Society Islands, French Polynesia. Unlike other species within the genus, M. mcphersonae is associated exclusively with coral reef habitat. Metabetaeus mcphersonae, like other alpheid shrimp helps with the coral reef soundscapes with their snapping activity which changes due to environmental factors. Various studies on related species like alphied shrimp explain how the intensity of their snapping grows at dawn and dusk as well as in warmer water. This indicates that the M. mcphersonae have an important role in forming coral reef acoustic environments.
