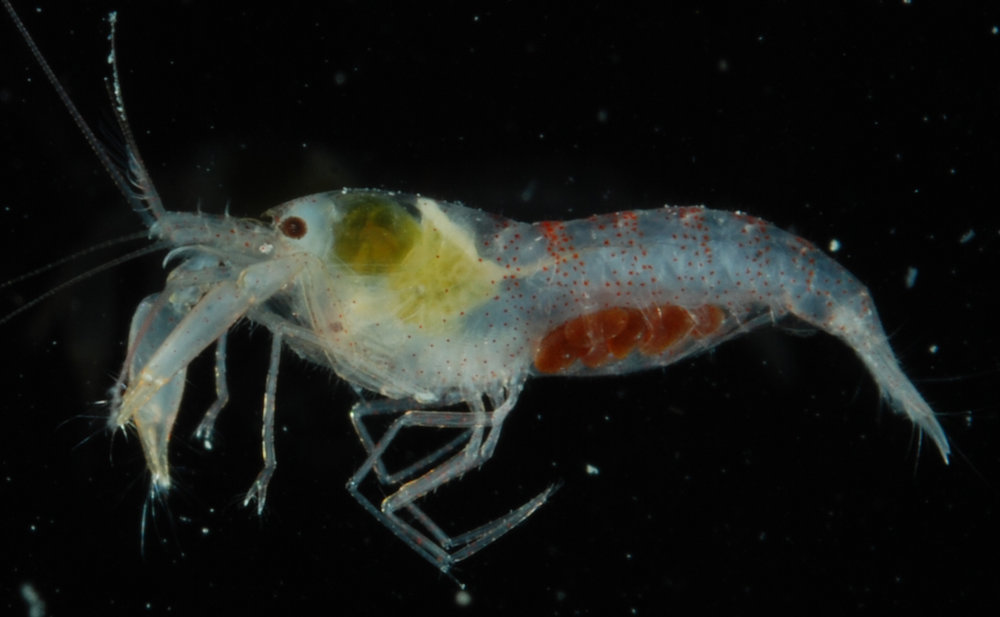
- Metabetaeus mcphersonae

Scientific classification
- Kingdom: Animalia
- Phylum: Arthropoda
- Clade: Pancrustacea
- Class: Malacostraca
- Order: Decapoda
- Suborder: Pleocyemata
- Infraorder: Caridea
- Family: Alpheidae
- Genus: Metabetaeus; Borradaile, 1899

= Metabetaeus =

Genus of crustaceans

Metabetaeus is a genus of shrimp in the family Alpheidae, comprising four species:

- Metabetaeus lapillicola Yamashita, Komai & Kon, 2023
- Metabetaeus lohena Banner & Banner, 1960
- Metabetaeus mcphersonae Anker, 2010
- Metabetaeus minutus (Whitelegge, 1897)
