= Metabetaeus lapillicola =

Scientific classification
- Kingdom: Animalia
- Phylum: Arthropoda
- Class: Malacostraca
- Order: Decapoda
- Suborder: Pleocyemata
- Infraorder: Caridea
- Family: Alpheidae
- Genus: Metabetaeus
- Species: M. lapillicola

Binomial name
- Metabetaeus lapillicola Yamashita, Komai & Kon, 2023

Species of alpheid shrimp

Metabetaeus lapillicola is a species of alpheid shrimp native to Japan. It is one of four known species within the genus Metabetaeus. The species has been recorded living on beaches within Shizuoka and Mie Prefectures in Honshu, Japan.

== Description ==
Metabetaeus lapillicola is semi-transparent in colour with infrequent red chromatophores speckling the carapace and pleomeres. The eyes of the animal are darkly pigmented and located on eyestalks. The carapace is smooth and hairless. The antennal scale ends in a strong spine that projects beyond the lamella, and the antennules and antennae bear long, multi-segmented flagella.

The first pair of pereopods is distinctly unequal, with one cheliped being greatly elongated with an almost hairless palm, while the other is shorter and more slender. The remaining pereopods are slender walking legs and some possess small spines. The pleon has rounded margins on the anterior segments, a small tooth on the fifth, and a sub-rectangular telson lacking anal tubercles but armed with several pairs of stout setae. The uropodal exopod bears a strong lateral tooth.

Sexual dimorphism is present within this species and most visible in the pleopods. Males shrimp have a well developed appendix masculina on the second pleopod, while females have relatively long endopods on the first pleopods.

Metabetaeus lapillicola can be distinguished from other shrimp within the genus Metabetaeus by the presence of a pterygostomial spine on the carapace. The species also possesses highly unequal chelipeds, with the major cheliped being considerably elongate. It also lacks a distinct distolateral spine on the uropodal endopod.

=== Reproduction ===
Females have been observed to carry between 25 and 41 eggs, which start off greyish-green in colour. Egg carrying females have been recorded from June to September. The eggs within this species are large, measuring between 0.36 and 0.77 mm in diameter, which suggests the species may hatch at a relatively advanced stage rather than passing through multiple free-swimming larval phases.

== Habitat ==
Metabetaeus lapillicola is a marine shrimp that inhabits the spaces between small pebbles on shingle beaches. The pebbles are uniformly sized ranging in size from 1 to 3 centimetres in diameter. It has been recorded to occupy both the lower intertidal to the upper subtidal zones of the beaches it inhabits. The gaps between the pebbles on shingle beaches provide the species with both shelter and access to water during tidal fluctuations. M. lapillicola is notable for inhabiting dynamic interstitial pebble habitats that are generally considered unsuitable for macrobenthos such as Caridean shrimp.

== Etymology ==
The species name lapillicola is derived from a Latin word that means "pebble dweller", which relates to the shrimp's shingle beach habitat.
