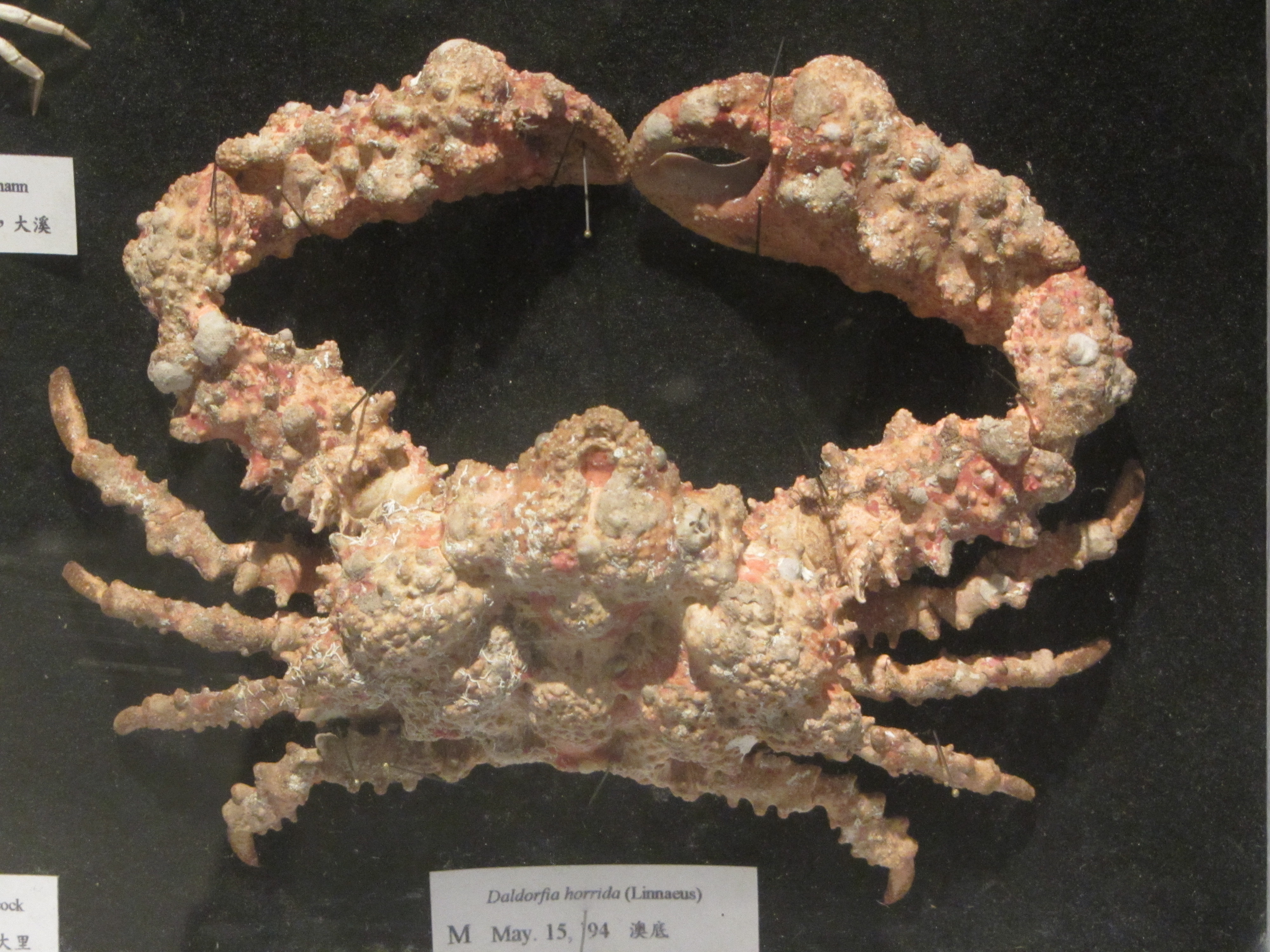
- Daldorfia horrida

Scientific classification
- Kingdom: Animalia
- Phylum: Arthropoda
- Class: Malacostraca
- Order: Decapoda
- Suborder: Pleocyemata
- Infraorder: Brachyura
- Family: Parthenopidae
- Genus: Daldorfia; Rathbun, 1904

Type species
- Cancer horrida Linnaeus, 1758

= Daldorfia =

Genus of decapods

Daldorfia is a genus of parthenopid crab, belonging to the subfamily Daldorfiinae.

== Species ==
There are 13 recognized extant and five extinct species in Daldorfia.

Extant species:

- Daldorfia bouvieri (Milne-Edwards), 1869
- Daldorfia calconopia Tan & Ng, 2007
- Daldorfia dimorpha Tan & Ng, 2007
- Daldorfia disalvoi Ng & Boyko, 2007
- Daldorfia excavata (Baker, 1905)
- Daldorfia glasselli (Garth, 1958)
- Daldorfia horrida (Linnaeus, 1758)
- Daldorfia investigatoris (Alcock, 1895)
- Daldorfia leprosa (Nobili, 1906)
- Daldorfia rathbuni (de Man, 1902)
- Daldorfia spinosissima (A. Milne-Edwards, 1862)
- Daldorfia triangularis Sakai, 1974
- Daldorfia trigona (A. Milne-Edwards, 1869)

Extinct species:

- Daldorfia eocaena Beschin, Busulini, De Angeli & Tessier, 2007
- Daldorfia fabianii Beschin, De Angeli & Checchi, 2003
- Daldorfia himaleoraphis Schweitzer, 2001
- Daldorfia nagashimai Karasawa & Kato, 1996
- Daldorfia salina Schweitzer, Feldmann, González-Barba & Ćosović, 2006
