= Alain raymondi =

Scientific classification
- Kingdom: Animalia
- Phylum: Arthropoda
- Clade: Pancrustacea
- Class: Malacostraca
- Order: Decapoda
- Suborder: Pleocyemata
- Infraorder: Brachyura
- Family: Pinnotheridae
- Genus: Alain
- Species: A. raymondi

Binomial name
- Alain raymondi Ahyong & Ng, 2008

Species of crab

Holotype site

Alain raymondi is a species of crab in the Pinnotheridae family. It was first described in 2008 by Ahyong and Peter Ng. The species epithet, raymondi, honours Ray Manning.

Currently it is known only from the Philippines, where it is found at depths of 453– 787 m.
