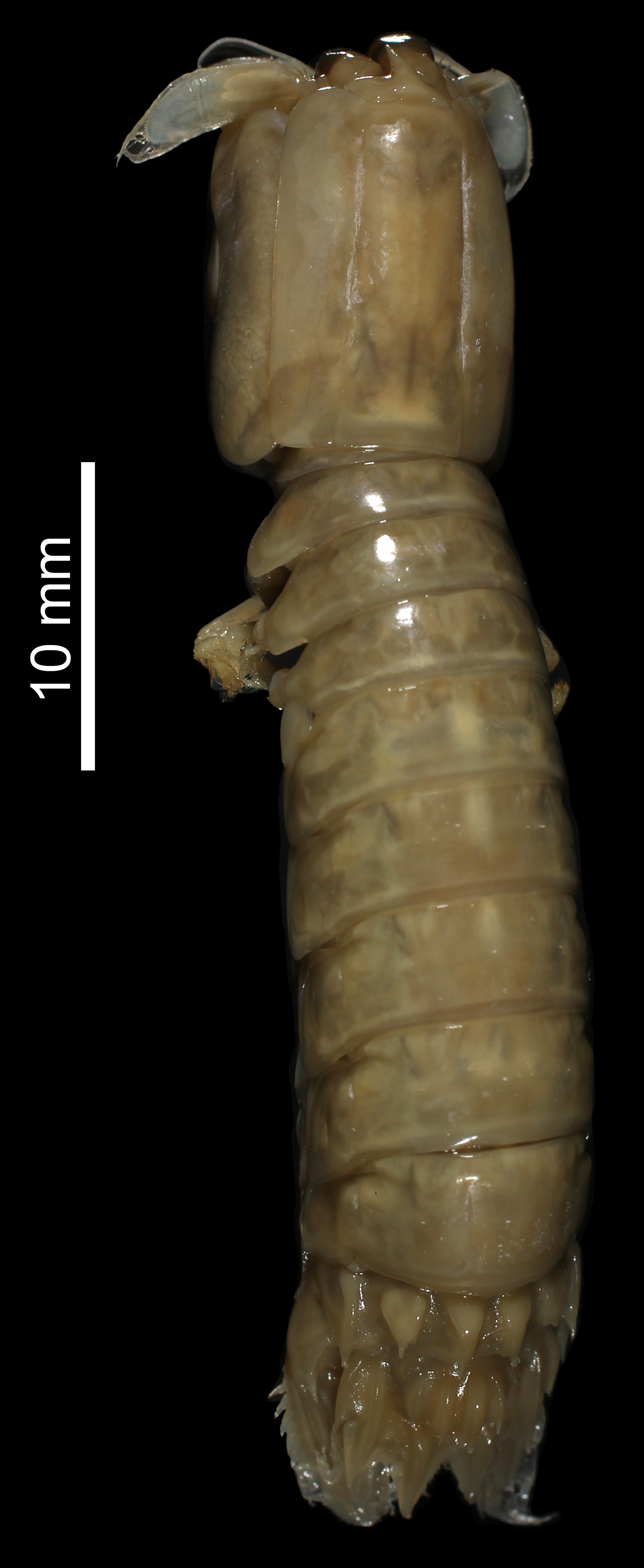
- Gonodactylaceus falcatus

Scientific classification
- Domain: Eukaryota
- Kingdom: Animalia
- Phylum: Arthropoda
- Class: Malacostraca
- Order: Stomatopoda
- Family: Gonodactylidae
- Genus: Gonodactylaceus; Manning, 1995

= Gonodactylaceus =

Genus of mantis shrimp

Gonodactylaceus, is a genus of mantis shrimp. The genus was first described in 1995 by Raymond Brendan Manning and contains the following species:

- Gonodactylaceus falcatus (Forskål, 1775)
- Gonodactylaceus glabrous (Brooks, 1886)
- Gonodactylaceus graphurus (Miers, 1875)
- Gonodactylaceus randalli (Manning, 1978)
- Gonodactylaceus ternatensis (de Man, 1902)
