= Metabetaeus minutus =

Scientific classification
- Domain: Eukaryota
- Kingdom: Animalia
- Phylum: Arthropoda
- Class: Malacostraca
- Order: Decapoda
- Suborder: Pleocyemata
- Infraorder: Caridea
- Family: Alpheidae
- Genus: Metabetaeus
- Species: M. minutus

Binomial name
- Metabetaeus minutus (Whitelegge, 1897)

Species of alpheid shrimp

Metabetaeus minutus is a species of alpheid shrimp native to the Indo-West Pacific.

== Description ==
Metabetaeus minutus can vary in colour from blood red to pink, orange or white depending on the concentration of red chromatophores on the shrimps body. The average size can range depending on the population, with the smallest collected from Fakaofo being 12 mm long and largest known specimen being collected from Jaluit Atoll at 17 mm long.

== Distribution and habitat ==
Metabetaeus minutus is native to the Indo-West pacific, where it can be found living on many islands including: Funafuti, Fakaofo, Jaluit Atoll, Arno Atoll, Easter Island, Minami Daito, Miyako Islands, Lifou, Sulawesi, Muna Island.

M. minutus can be found inhabiting landlocked anchialine pools, containing brackish water. Populations can also be found living in anchialine caves and brackish pools in mangrove swamps. Pools are often formed in limestone bedrock and contain loamy substrate. M. minutus have been recorded to coinhabit their pools with crab species such as Ptychognathus easteranus. The shrimp have also been recorded to host the parasite hemiarthrine bopyrid.
