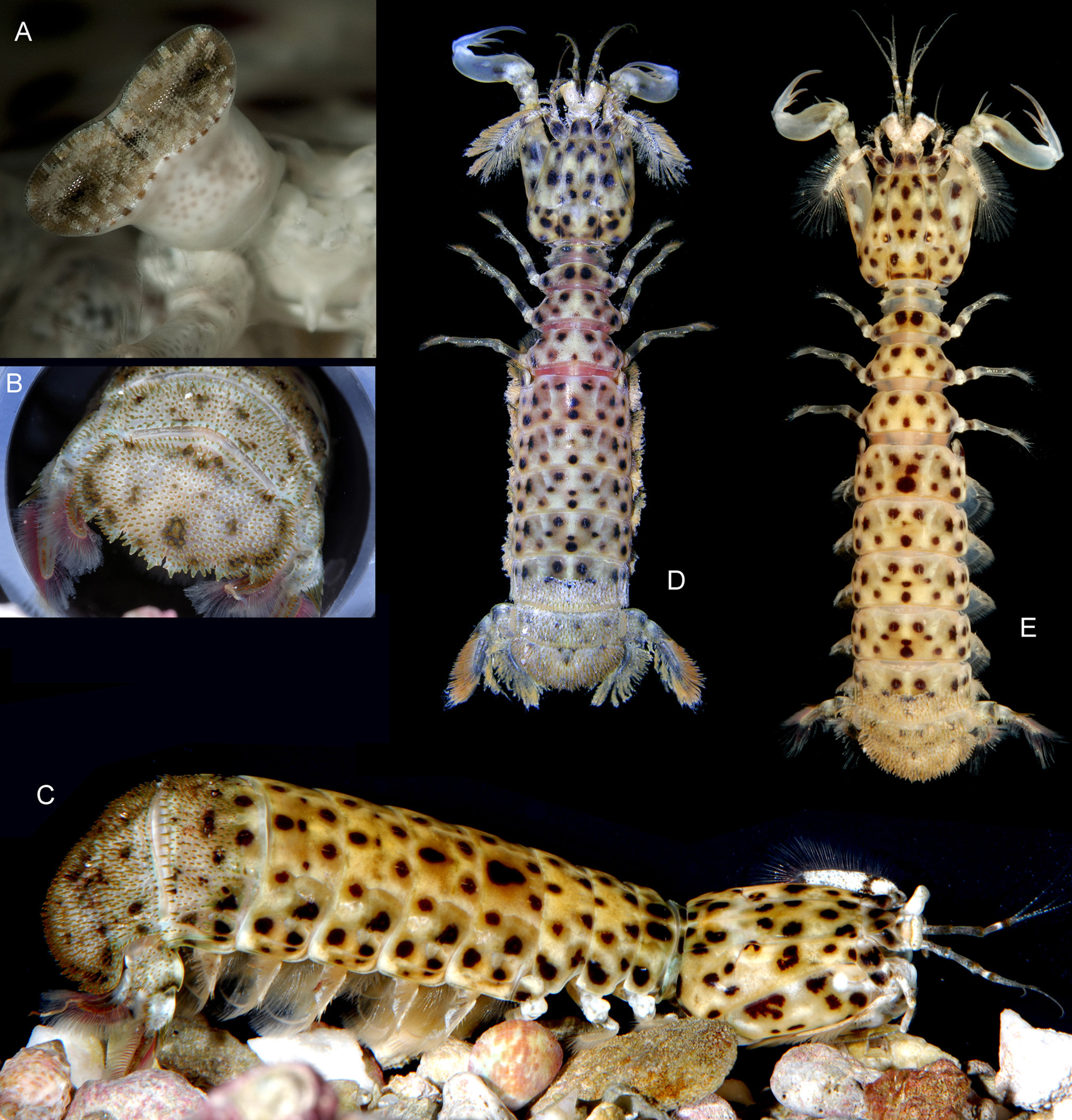
- Ankersquilla pardus

Scientific classification
- Kingdom: Animalia
- Phylum: Arthropoda
- Clade: Pancrustacea
- Class: Malacostraca
- Order: Stomatopoda
- Suborder: Unipeltata
- Superfamily: Eurysquilloidea; Manning, 1977
- Family: Eurysquillidae; Manning, 1977

Genera
- See text

= Eurysquillidae =

Family of crustaceans

Eurysquillidae is a family of mantis shrimp. Formerly placed in the superfamily Gonodactyloidea, it has since been recognised that eurysquillids are closer to families in the Squilloidea, and so Eurysquillidae has been placed in its own superfamily, Eurysquilloidea. The family was first described in 1977 by Raymond Manning.

It includes six genera and 30 species

- Ankersquilla Ahyong, Porter & Caldwell, 2020
  - Ankersquilla pardus Ahyong, Porter & Caldwell, 2020
- Coronidopsis Hansen, 1926
  - Coronidopsis bicuspis Hansen, 1926
  - Coronidopsis serenei Moosa, 1973
- Eurysquilla Manning, 1963a
  - Eurysquilla chacei Manning, 1969
  - Eurysquilla crosnieri Moosa, 1991
  - Eurysquilla foresti Moosa, 1986
  - Eurysquilla galatheae Manning, 1977
  - Eurysquilla holthuisi Manning, 1969
  - Eurysquilla leloeuffi Manning, 1977
  - Eurysquilla maiaguesensis (Bigelow, 1901)
  - Eurysquilla pacifica Manning, 1975
  - Eurysquilla plumata (Bigelow, 1901)
  - Eurysquilla pumae Hendrickx & Salgado-Barragán, 1987
  - Eurysquilla sewelli (Chopra, 1939)
  - Eurysquilla solari Manning, 1970
  - Eurysquilla veleronis (Schmitt, 1940)
- Eurysquilloides Manning, 1963a
  - Eurysquilloides sibogae (Hansen, 1926)
- Manningia Serène, 1962
  - Manningia amabilis Holthuis, 1967
  - Manningia andamanensis Ghosh, 1975
  - Manningia arabica Manning, 1990
  - Manningia australiensis Manning, 1970
  - Manningia misool Ahyong, 1997
  - Manningia notialis Manning, 1966
  - Manningia pilaensis (de Man, 1888)
  - Manningia posteli Manning, 1977
  - Manningia raymondi Bruce, 1986
  - Manningia wilsoni Ahyong, 2001
  - Manningia zehntneri Manning, 1974
- Raysquilla Ahyong, 2000
  - Raysquilla manningi Ahyong, 2000
- Sinosquilla Liu & Wang, 1978
  - Sinosquilla hispida Liu & Wang, 1978
  - Sinosquilla sinica Liu & Wang, 1978
