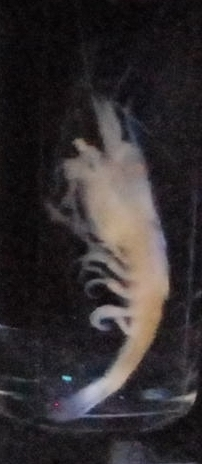

Conservation status
- Least Concern (IUCN 3.1)

Scientific classification
- Kingdom: Animalia
- Phylum: Arthropoda
- Class: Malacostraca
- Order: Decapoda
- Suborder: Pleocyemata
- Infraorder: Caridea
- Family: Atyidae
- Genus: Troglocaris
- Species: T. anophthalmus

Binomial name
- Troglocaris anophthalmus (Kollar, 1848)

Synonyms
- Palaemon anophtalmus Kollar, 1848 (incorrect original spelling); Palaemon anophthalmus Kollar, 1848; Troglocaris Schmidti Dormitzer, 1853

= Troglocaris anophthalmus =

Species of crustacean

Troglocaris anophthalmus is a species of freshwater shrimp in the family Atyidae. It lives in karstic caves in Bosnia and Herzegovina, Croatia, Italy and Slovenia. Although morphologically similar across its 500-kilometre (310 mi) range, molecular phylogenetics suggests that there are four or five cryptic lineages with more restricted ranges, although one such lineage does range unusually widely for a troglobite – over 300 kilometres (190 mi).

Like other underground-living animals, this shrimp lacks pigment (appearing whitish) and eyes. The carapace length is typically about 0.5–0.9 cm (0.20–0.35 in).

It was originally described by Vincenz Kollar as Palaemon anophtalmus (a misspelling of "anophthalmus"), but this name was considered to be a nomen nudum for a long time. This name is, however, accompanied by a description, and predates Dormitzer's junior synonym Troglocaris schmidtii.
