= Typhlatya iliffei =

Conservation status
- Critically Endangered (IUCN 2.3)

Scientific classification
- Kingdom: Animalia
- Phylum: Arthropoda
- Class: Malacostraca
- Order: Decapoda
- Suborder: Pleocyemata
- Infraorder: Caridea
- Family: Atyidae
- Genus: Typhlatya
- Species: T. iliffei

Binomial name
- Typhlatya iliffei Hart & Manning, 1981

Species of crustacean

Typhlatya iliffei is a species of basket shrimp in the family Atyidae, and was first described in 1981 by C.W. Hart Junior & Raymond B. Manning. It is found in the Caribbean.

The IUCN conservation status of Typhlatya iliffei is "CR", critically endangered. The species faces an extremely high risk of extinction in the immediate future. The IUCN status was reviewed in 1996.
