= Acantholambrus =

Acantholambrus Temporal range: Eocene

Scientific classification
- Kingdom: Animalia
- Phylum: Arthropoda
- Class: Malacostraca
- Order: Decapoda
- Suborder: Pleocyemata
- Infraorder: Brachyura
- Family: Parthenopidae
- Subfamily: Parthenopinae
- Genus: †Acantholambrus; Blow & Manning, 1996
- Species: †A. baumi

Binomial name
- †Acantholambrus baumi Blow & Manning, 1996

Extinct genus of crabs

Acantholambrus is an extinct genus of crab. It contains the single species Acantholambrus baumi, and was named by Blow and Manning in 1996.
