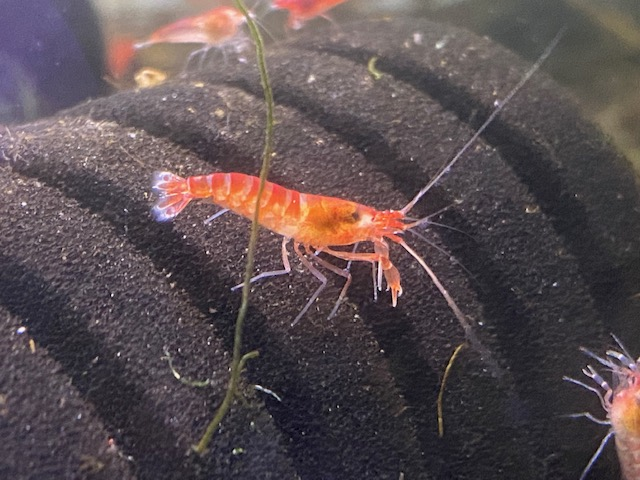
- A captive specimen.

Conservation status
- Imperiled (NatureServe)

Scientific classification
- Kingdom: Animalia
- Phylum: Arthropoda
- Clade: Pancrustacea
- Class: Malacostraca
- Order: Decapoda
- Suborder: Pleocyemata
- Infraorder: Caridea
- Family: Alpheidae
- Genus: Metabetaeus
- Species: M. lohena

Binomial name
- Metabetaeus lohena Banner & Banner, 1960

= Metabetaeus lohena =

Species of alpheid shrimp

Metabetaeus lohena, also known as the alpha snapping shrimp or anchialine snapping shrimp, is a species of alpheid shrimp native to Hawaii and Easter Island.

== Description ==
Metabetaeus lohena is an alpheid scavenger, which will also hunt small anchialine invertebrates. M. lohena grows to lengths of 18 mm and are pale pink to vibrant red in colour. Shrimp possess large claws and a clearly visible mandibular spot. Females once gravid will produce a mass of 20 to 29 eggs. M. lohena larvae lack a yolk sack, which suggests the species possess a planktotrophic larval feeding phase. M. lohena have been recorded to live for up to 6 years.

== Distribution and habitat ==
Metabetaeus lohena has a widespread distribution in Hawaii where it is native to many islands. The species is also found on Easter Island. They live in anchialine pools, which are landlocked bodies of water with underground connections to the ocean. These pools often possess fresh or brackish water near the surface, but saline water at depth. Shrimp can be found naturally living at salinities ranging from 2 to 36 ppt and water temperatures at around 20 °C (68 °F) or higher. Hawaiian populations of M. lohena coexist alongside their prey species ʻōpaeʻula shrimp (Halocaridina rubra) with their known range entirely overlapping.

== Folklore ==
The anchialine ecosystem shrimp are described in the Maui folklore tale The Legend of the Waiʻanapanapa Caves—the story of a princess murdered by her husband, a chief. A short summary of the legend is posted publicly outside of the caves in Waiʻanapanapa State Park:
"Once upon a time, a Hawaiian princess named Popoalaea fled from her cruel husband, the chief Kakae. She hid on the ledge just inside the underwater entrance to this cave. A faithful serving maid sat across from her fanning the princess with a feather kāhili, a symbol of royalty. Noticing the reflection of the kāhili in the water, the chief Kakae discovered Popoalaea's hiding place and killed her. At certain times of the year, tiny red shrimp appear in the pool, turning the water red. Some say it is a reminder of the blood of the slain princess."
