= Pseudosquillopsis =

Scientific classification
- Kingdom: Animalia
- Phylum: Arthropoda
- Clade: Pancrustacea
- Class: Malacostraca
- Order: Stomatopoda
- Family: Parasquillidae
- Genus: Pseudosquillopsis; Serène, 1962

Genus of crustaceans

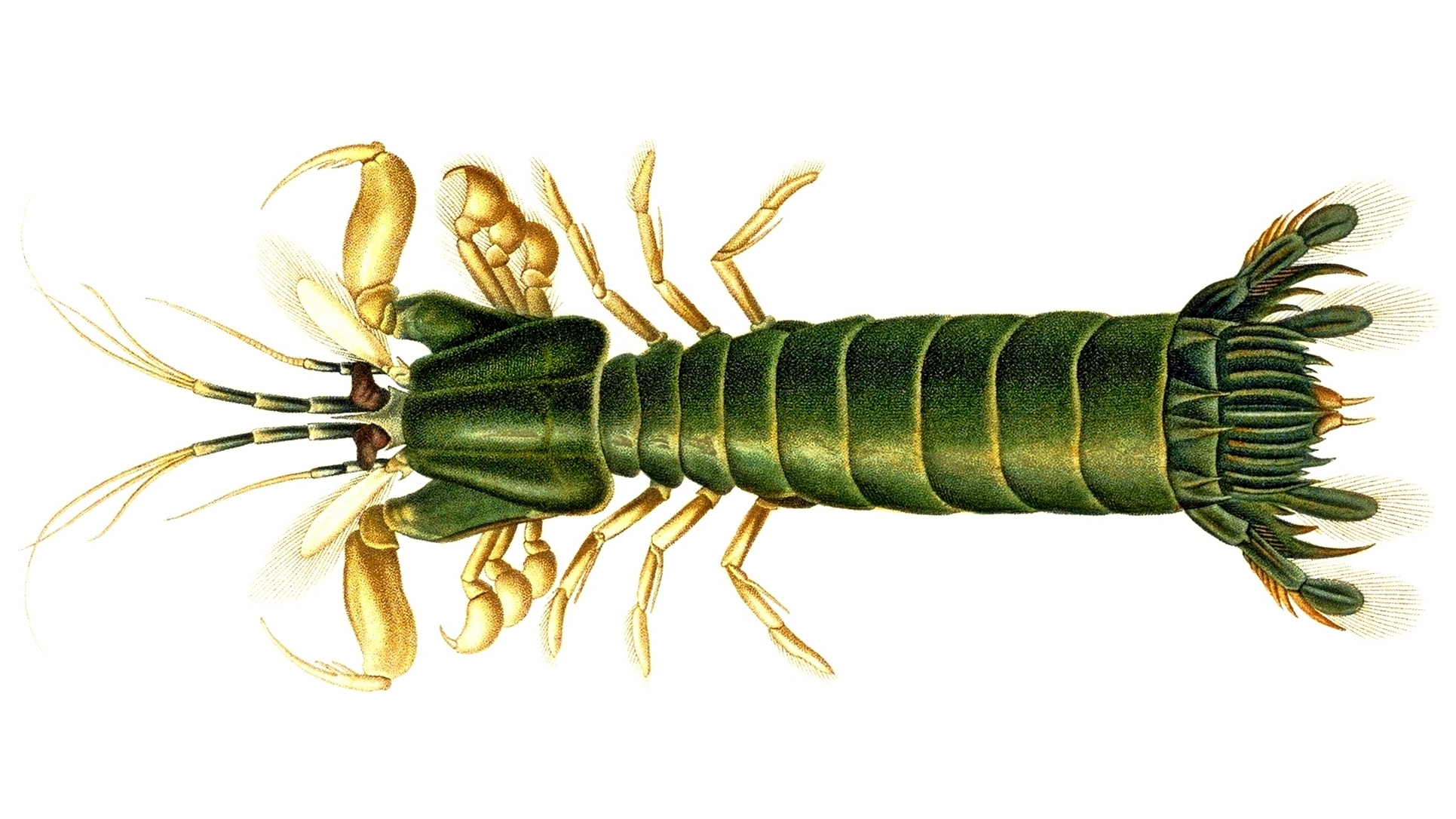
Pseudosquillopsis lessonii

Pseudosquillopsis is a genus of mantis shrimp in the family Parasquillidae.

== Species ==
Species in the genus include:

- Pseudosquillopsis cerisii (Roux, 1828)
- Pseudosquillopsis dofleini (Balss, 1910)
- Pseudosquillopsis lessonii (Guérin, 1830)
- Pseudosquillopsis marmorata (Lockington, 1877)
