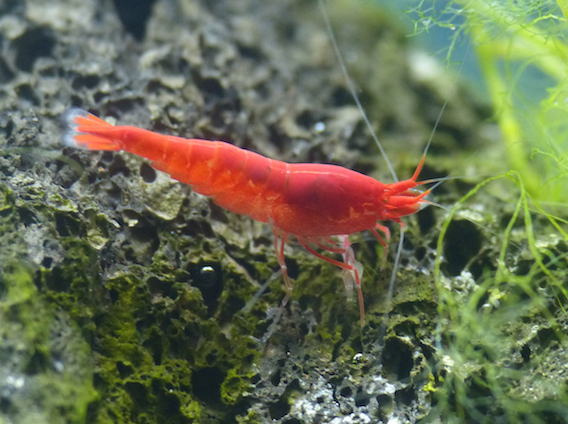
- An ʻōpaeʻula

Conservation status
- Vulnerable (NatureServe)

Scientific classification
- Kingdom: Animalia
- Phylum: Arthropoda
- Clade: Pancrustacea
- Class: Malacostraca
- Order: Decapoda
- Suborder: Pleocyemata
- Infraorder: Caridea
- Family: Atyidae
- Genus: Halocaridina
- Species: H. rubra

Binomial name
- Halocaridina rubra Holthuis, 1963

= Halocaridina rubra =

Species of shrimp

Halocaridina rubra, the Hawaiian red shrimp or volcano shrimp is a small red shrimp of the family Atyidae, with the common Hawaiian name ʻōpaeʻula (meaning "red shrimp"). The species is the state shrimp of Hawaii.

== Description and distribution ==
Halocaridina rubra are small red shrimp, which can also appear yellow or orange, and are rarely longer than 1.5 cm (0.6 in). They have a short and pointed rostrum, up to the end of the basal segment of the antennular peduncle. It is dorsoventrally depressed, being broadly triangular in dorsal view and narrow in lateral view. It does not have teeth or spines.

They are typically found in brackish water pools near the sea shore, sometimes in large numbers. Such pools are referred to as anchialine pools (from the Greek anchialos = near the sea). They have also been found in caverns in the coral plains near the seashore and wells close to the ocean. Halocaridina rubra is endemic to the Hawaiian Islands, and most commonly found in anchialine pools in fresh lava substrates on Hawaiʻi and Maui Island; it has also been found in limestone karst pools and hypogeal habitats in limestone on older islands, such as Oʻahu. Its habitat is unique and sparsely represented on five of the eight high Hawaiian Islands (Maui, Kahoʻolawe, Oʻahu, Molokaʻi and Hawaiʻi).

They occasionally molt their shells, which can be seen as silvery exoskeletons at the bottom of the tank. There may be some evidence that ʻōpaeʻula mate after molting, or that molting and mating may be related.

== Ecology ==
ʻŌpaeʻula are herbivorous and detritivorous shrimp occupying both hypogeal (subterranean) and epigeal (surface) anchialine waters. Typical food of ʻōpaeʻula is algal and bacterial mats on the surface of rocks and other substrates in anchialine pools. Chelipeds are adapted for scraping and filtering of algal-bacterial layers. Serrated setae scrape the substrate surface, and filamentous setae collect the loosened food materials. The latter can also act as filters for filter feeding during phytoplankton blooms. The grazing activity of this shrimp is essential in maintaining the integrity of the crust, an actively growing matrix of plants, bacteria, diatoms, protozoans, and underlying siliceous and carbonate materials. Halocaridina is well adapted to the epigeal-hypogeal habitat in the pools. It reproduces in the subterranean portion of the habitat. It is known to be preyed upon by the slightly larger Metabetaeus lohena shrimp, having an entirely overlapping known natural range with them on Hawaii.

In October 2026, three live Halocaridina rubra shrimp were launched to the International Space Station aboard SpaceX CRS-35 as part of the SCAMPI (Saltwater Crustaceans, Algae, and Microbial Population Investigation) experiment. Developed under the ESA Academy Experiments Programme, the student-led project placed the shrimp inside a sealed aquatic ecosystem alongside macroalgae and microorganisms to study how closed bioregenerative life-support systems function in microgravity.

== Folklore ==
The anchialine ecosystem shrimp are described in the Maui folklore tale The Legend of the Waiʻanapanapa Caves—the story of a princess murdered by her husband, a chief. A short summary of the legend is posted publicly outside of the caves in Waiʻanapanapa State Park:
"Once upon a time, a Hawaiian princess named Popoalaea fled from her cruel husband, the chief Kakae. She hid on the ledge just inside the underwater entrance to this cave. A faithful serving maid sat across from her fanning the princess with a feather kāhili, a symbol of royalty. Noticing the reflection of the kāhili in the water, the chief Kakae discovered Popoalaea's hiding place and killed her. At certain times of the year, tiny red shrimp appear in the pool, turning the water red. Some say it is a reminder of the blood of the slain princess."
