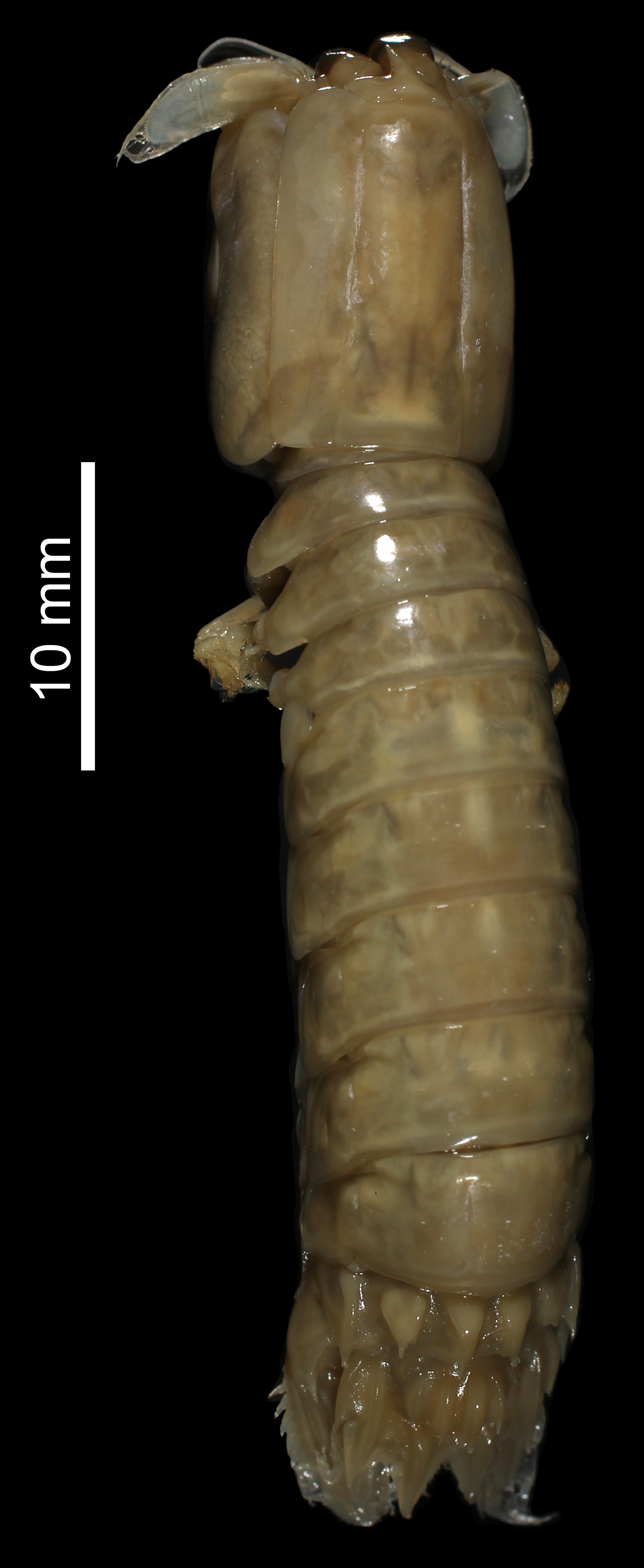

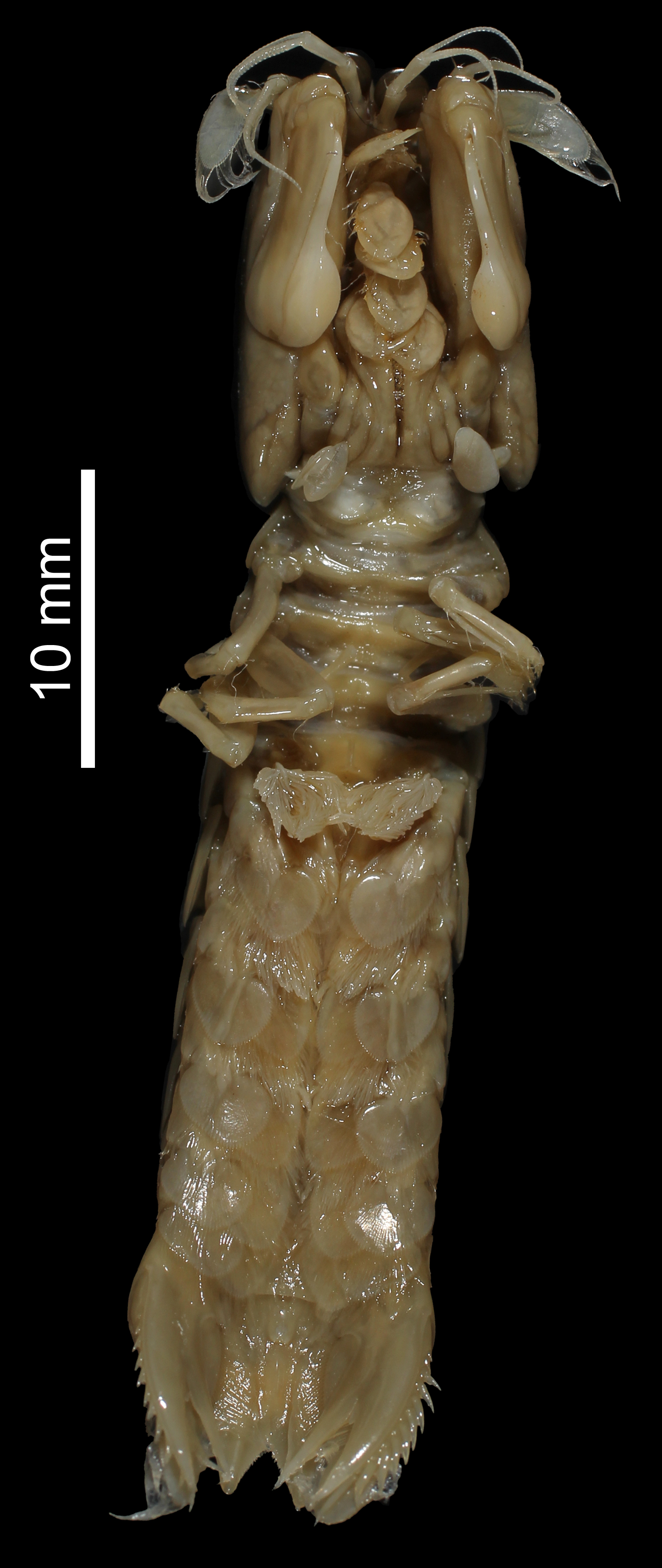

Scientific classification
- Kingdom: Animalia
- Phylum: Arthropoda
- Clade: Pancrustacea
- Class: Malacostraca
- Order: Stomatopoda
- Family: Gonodactylidae
- Genus: Gonodactylaceus
- Species: G. falcatus

Binomial name
- Gonodactylaceus falcatus (Forskål, 1775)

Synonyms
- Cancer falcatus Forskål, 1775; Gonodactylaceus gravieri Manning, 1995; Gonodactylus aloha Manning & Reaka, 1981; Gonodactylus chiragra var. mutatus Lanchester, 1903; Gonodactylus falcatus (Forskål, 1775); Gonodactylus glaber var. rotundus Borradaile, 1907; Gonodactylus insularis Manning & Reaka, 1982; Gonodactylus mutatus Lanchester, 1903; Gonodactylus siamensis Manning & Reaka, 1981; Gonodactylus takedai Moosa, 1989

= Gonodactylaceus falcatus =

Species of shrimp

Gonodactylaceus falcatus, the Philippine mantis shrimp, is a large stomatopod found throughout the Indo-Pacific.

== Morphology ==
G. falcatus is a small to medium-sized mantis shrimp. It possesses a segmented body from its cephalothorax and abdomen. It has stalked eyes that are able to move independently.

=== Size ===
Males vary in length from 47–62 mm (1.9–2.4 in), while females range from 46–59 mm (1.8–2.3 in).

=== Patterns and colorations ===
Individual shrimps vary in color and typically have dark green shells with red or orange antennae. Males tend to be darker in color with a red banded body and flagella. The scales on their antennae range from blue to crimson and they have an orange meral spot on their raptorial claw. Females usually have lighter shades of reddish-brown. The scales on their antennae range from maroon to yellow, and their legs are segmented with colors ranging from bright yellow to dull orange.

=== Ocular scales ===
G. falcatus has nearly cylindrical eyes and relatively small ocular scales that have less than a 1mm distance between them. The apex of the eyes is rounded and erect from the body line. At both larvae and adult stages, G. falcatus has ultraviolet vision. Larvae have a sensitivity peak at 340 nm, while adult retina develop further to and can absorb up to 551 nm. Adult mantis shrimps are able to regulate the light they absorb based on their environment, especially while hunting.

=== Anatomical structure ===
G.Falcatus peeks out of a hole in the reef, exposing its green body

==== Rostral plate ====
G. falcatus is divided into a tri-spinous form with a relatively short median plate. The anterior margins of the plate lie straight and either sit perpendicular to the body line or slope towards the posterior. The basal portion of the plate is rounded, and the anterolateral is blunt and acutely angled. The length of its median spine is nearly equal to or slightly less than its measured broadness. The size of the rostral plate varies according to the allometric growth of its median and anterior margins but remains proportionally longest in small specimens and shorter over larger sizes. In G. falcatus, two forms of the rostral plate shape exist, with its backside either sloping or transverse and concaving.

==== Abdomen somites ====
The first five abdominal somites are smooth and unarmed at a posterolateral angle, lacking any transverse grooves. Some specimens are observed to have light black spots on this section in transverse rows. The organism's sixth abdominal site has a sharp median carina and six dorsal carinae that are inflated and posteriorly armed. The submedian and intermedian carinae are flattened dorsally, accompanied by black spots visible from the front.

==== Uropod and telson ====
The tail appendage, called the uropod, is wider at the attachment to the body (the protopod), which spans across two flattened spines. The uropod's outer section has a single row of setae on the inside edge (endopod) and 10-12 spines on the outside edge (exopod).

The telson has a nearly equal length and width with a postanal carina on the ventral surface.

=== Sexual dimorphism ===
Sexual dimorphism was accounted for in specimens found in Hawaiian coasts. Size variance between females and male G. falcatus appears in sizes as small as 17 mm (0.67 in). Physical attributes observed in females are a narrower, sharply curved carinae on the telson and sixth abdominal somite. At the base of the claws (dactylus), females have a swelling that forms a distinct angle at the shaft and a sharp sweep-like curve on the tip of the claw compared to males.

== Physiology ==
One of the predatory adaptions of G. falcatus is their fast, powerful strikes by their hammer-shaped appendage. The enlarged extensor muscle attached to their "hammer" acts as a spring that gradually compresses whilst stalking prey. The tension is held by flexor muscles that release with a rapid strike. The striking power is able to break through the defenses of hard-shelled prey at angular velocities for larval shrimps averaging 292.7 rad per second. Its striking speeds reach up to five to ten times faster than the max swimming speeds of similarly sized organisms.

== Behavior ==
=== Territoriality ===
G. falcatus is strongly territorial and displays high aggression compared to other stomatopods. When their burrows are threatened, they will readily snap their raptorial claws against intruders, even resorting to killing them at times. It is uncommon for more than one individual to be found residing in the same spaces without conflict. The specimen will use its telson as a shield by flexing its body to protect its underside while watching for threats, with the raptorial claw prepared to strike.

In addition, research has found that G. falcatus has evolved circular polarization vision, allowing them to avoid the burrows of other individuals. They do this by moving their bodies in circularly polarized patterns into concentrated areas, like the telson or their claws, that are typically exposed or flashed for defense during interactions. Other individuals are able to identify the polarized light and if they sense that a burrow is occupied, they will avoid it. To reduce risk, members will primarily occupy empty burrows and display strong aversions to any homes with an emitting circular polarized light from inside.

=== Hunting and feeding ===
This species is an ambush predator and relies on its strikes to capture and break the defenses of its prey. The strike's acceleration can generate sufficient forces to crush hard-bodied shells, allowing them to exploit prey resources that other mantis shrimps cannot pierce through. G. falcatus feeds on mollusks and smaller crustaceans, specifically attacking vulnerable muscle and shell joints to stun movement.

The initial three larval development stages rely on the yolk sac for nutrients. After G. falcatus begin hunting, they exhibit behavioral changes such as becoming attracted to light in order to hunt effectively.

Once the teeth and mandibles are developed, larval shrimps eat mainly plankton such as Artemia nauplii. They have also been seen preying on pearl oysters in reef and culture environments, and can individually cause about 33% mortality in oyster groups. When live prey is scarce, adult shrimp may scavenge for food.

== Life cycle ==
G. falcatus have two peak-breeding periods per year – October to January and late March to mid-April. Larvae require a minimum of 22 days of pelagic life, which can be prolonged for an indefinite period until they are in suitable conditions for metamorphosis. Upon mating, the mother rears the eggs in small-enclosed spaces like sandstones or rock hole formations. Each egg is a bright yellow and approximately range 0.78-0.81 mm in size. In the advanced stage of embryotic development, the basic characteristics of G. falcatus form, including their eyes, abdomen, antennae, and telson.

Four known stages occur, indicated when the outer shell molts. Stage one larvae are about 2.2 mm and retain most of the yolk mass in part of their head and thorax. Their eyes are immobile and don't have stalks. In stage two, the larvae grow to about 2.8 mm with the carapace growing to 1.3 mm. Its eye stalks are now defined, and the rostrum stretches past the antennae. Segments of the spine are now visible, with an increasing number of limbs protruding from each abdominal somite. Stage three is distinguished by the elongation of the rostrum past its antennae and the teething in its mandibles. The sixth abdominal somite separates itself from the other regions and the telson, but it is not fully developed. Stage four (days 9–14) has larvae approximately 3.8-3.9 mm in length with a near-fully developed spine and telson, and larger and stronger teeth. Unlike the previous three stages, no more of the yolk sac remains and the raptorial claw is fully differentiated.

== Geographic distribution ==
Observations collected G. falcatus in subtidal shores amongst rubble or up to 12–18 m (39–59 ft) outward into the oceans, typically in coral reef ecosystems. Specifications on regions are found in the Western Indian Ocean to Australia, Japan and the Central Pacific, including but not limited to Eastern Africa, Maldives, Vietnam, Indonesia, New Caledonia, Hawaii, and Papua New Guinea. Those recently discovered in Guam have been notably larger.
