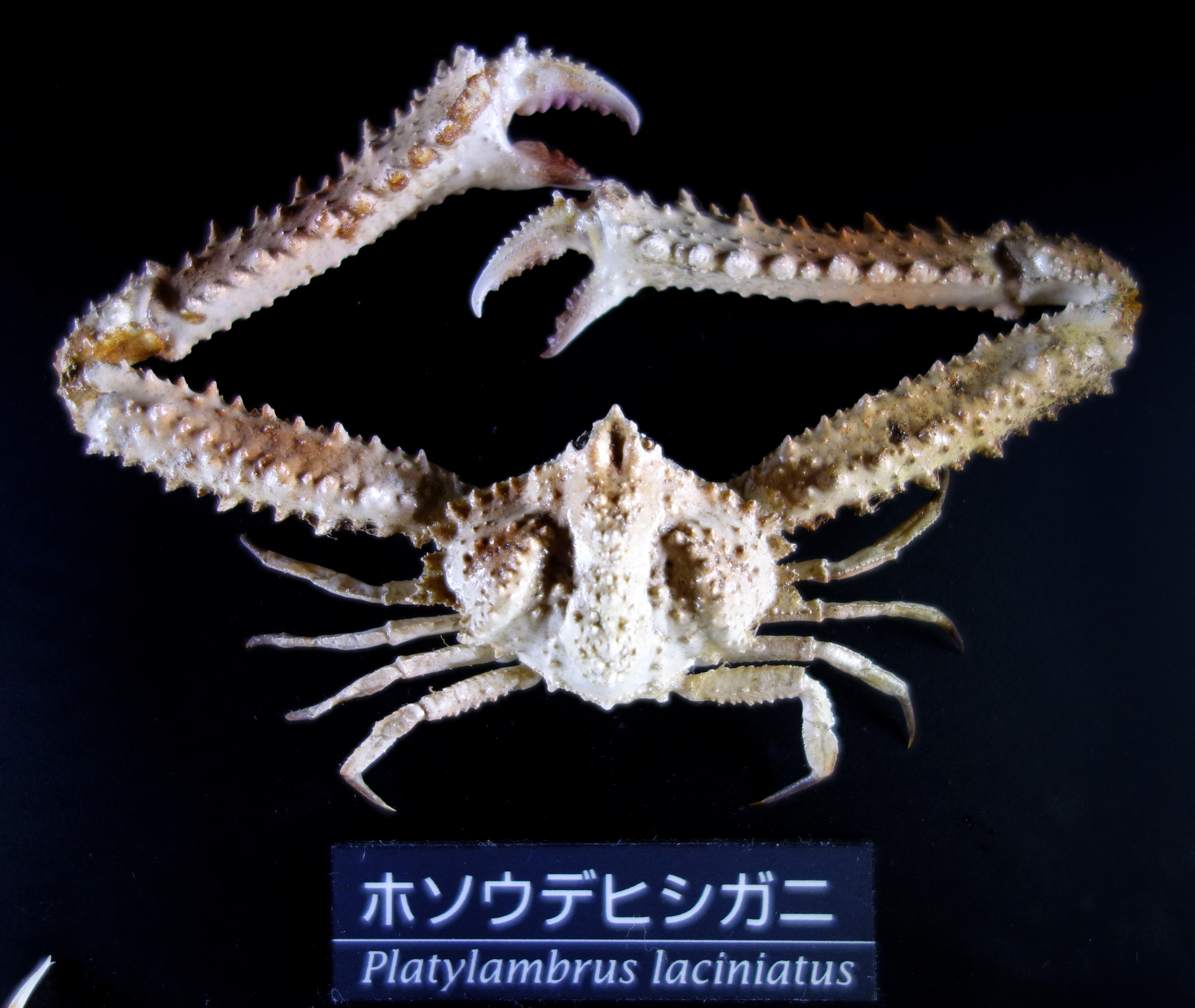
- Enoplolambrus laciniatus

Scientific classification
- Kingdom: Animalia
- Phylum: Arthropoda
- Class: Malacostraca
- Order: Decapoda
- Suborder: Pleocyemata
- Infraorder: Brachyura
- Subsection: Heterotremata
- Superfamily: Parthenopoidea; Macleay, 1838
- Family: Parthenopidae; Macleay, 1838

Subfamilies
- Daldorfiinae; Parthenopinae

= Parthenopidae =

Family of crabs

Parthenopidae is a family of crabs, placed in its own superfamily, Parthenopoidea. It comprises nearly 40 genera, divided into two subfamilies, with three genera incertae sedis:

Daldorfiinae Ng & Rodríguez, 1986

- Daldorfia Rathbun, 1904
- Niobafia S. H. Tan & Ng, 2007
- Olenorfia S. H. Tan & Ng, 2007
- Thyrolambrus Rathbun, 1894

Parthenopinae MacLeay, 1838

- † Acantholambrus Blow & Manning, 1996
- Agolambrus S. H. Tan & Ng, 2007
- Aulacolambrus Paul'son, 1875
- † Bittnerilia De Angeli & Garassino, 2003
- Celatopesia Chiong & Ng, 1998
- Certolambrus S. H. Tan & Ng, 2003
- Costalambrus S. H. Tan & Ng, 2007
- Cryptopodia H. Milne-Edwards, 1834
- Derilambrus S. H. Tan & Ng, 2007
- Distolambrus S. H. Tan & Ng, 2007
- Enoplolambrus A. Milne-Edwards, 1878
- Furtipodia S. H. Tan & Ng, 2003
- Garthambrus Ng, 1996
- Heterocrypta Stimpson, 1871
- Hispidolambrus McLay & S. H. Tan, 2009
- Hypolambrus S. H. Tan & Ng, 2007
- Lambrachaeus Alcock, 1895
- Latulambrus S. H. Tan & Ng, 2007
- Leiolambrus A. Milne-Edwards, 1878
- Mesorhoea Stimpson, 1871
- Mimilambrus Williams, 1979
- Neikolambrus S. H. Tan & Ng, 2003
- Nodolambrus S. H. Tan & Ng, 2007
- Ochtholambrus S. H. Tan & Ng, 2007
- Parthenope Weber, 1795
- Parthenopoides Miers, 1879
- Patulambrus S. H. Tan & Ng, 2007
- Piloslambrus S. H. Tan & Ng, 2007
- Platylambrus Stimpson, 1871
- Pseudolambrus Paul’son, 1875
- Rhinolambrus A. Milne-Edwards, 1878
- Solenolambrus Stimpson, 1871
- Spinolambrus S. H. Tan & Ng, 2007
- Tutankhamen Rathbun, 1925
- Velolambrus S. H. Tan & Ng, 2007
- Zarenkolambrus McLay & S. H. Tan, 2009

incertae sedis

- † Branchiolambrus Rathbun, 1908
- Lambrus Leach, 1815
- † Mesolambrus Müller & Collins, 1991
