= Raymond B. Manning =

American carcinologist

Raymond Brendan Manning (October 11, 1934 – January 18, 2000) was an American carcinologist, specialising in alpha taxonomy and mantis shrimp.

His zoological author abbreviation is Manning or sometimes R.B. Manning. He has authored over 500 taxa.

== Biography ==
Raymond Manning was born in Brooklyn, New York, in 1934, but moved almost immediately with his mother to Haiti. They lived in Bethesda, Maryland, for the duration of the Second World War, but then returned to Haiti, to live in a house in Port-au-Prince owned by Raymond's adoptive father. Raymond was sent to a boarding school in Tampa, Florida, and studied at the University of Florida, gaining his B.S. (1956), M.S. (1959) and Ph.D. (1963) degrees from the University of Miami. While at university, Manning met and married Lilly King, who would be the illustrator for his scientific papers throughout his life. On completing his doctorate, Manning was immediately appointed an associate curator at the Smithsonian Institution.

== Scientific career ==
Manning was "an extremely productive carcinologist"; during his lifetime, he produced 282 scientific papers and monographs on extant and fossil stomatopods and decapods, and a further eight papers have been published posthumously. More than one half of these papers were on stomatopods, with nearly one third being descriptions of new species. A total of 306 species, 153 genera, 5 subfamilies, 19 families and 3 superfamilies were described in papers written or co-written by Manning.

Manning was also an avid field biologist, and his collections, mostly from Florida, Ascension Island, and the Mediterranean Basin, amounted to more than 50,000 specimens. The collection of stomatopods he amassed is the largest in the world, and covers 90% of the known species.

Manning was one of the founders of the Crustacean Society, and its first president, and helped to establish the Journal of Crustacean Biology.

== Taxa ==
Raymond Manning is commemorated in a number of scientific names of genera and species:

- Acanthosquilla manningi Makarov, 1978
- Acoridon manningi Adkison, Heard & Hopkins, 1983
- Alain raymondi Ahyong & Ng, 2008
- Arcotheres rayi Ahyong & Ng, 2007
- Calaxiopsis manningi Komai, 2000
- Calaxius manningi Kensley, Lin, & Yu, 2000
- Cambarus manningi Hobbs, 1981
- Cyclodorippe manningi Tavares, 1993
- Eumanningia Crosnier, 2000
- Eumanningia pliarthron Crosnier, 2000
- Eunephrops manningi (Holthuis, 1975)
- Grynaminna Poore, 2000
- Holothuria mannigi Pawson, 1978
- Lepidophthalmus manningi Felder & Staton, 2000
- Lithodes manningi Macpherson, 1988
- Lysiosquilla manningi Boyko, 2000
- Manningia raymondi Bruce, 1986
- Manningia Serène, 1960
- Manningiana Pretzmann, 1972
- Manningis Al-Khayat & Jones, 1996
- Microprosthema manningi Goy & Felder, 1988
- Nannosquilla raymanningi Salgado-Barragán & Hendrickx, 1998
- Nanogalathea raymondi Tirmizi, 1980
- Naushonia manningi Akvarez, Villalobos, & Iliffe
- Neonesidea manningi Maddocks, 1975
- Oratosquillina manningi Ahyong, Chan & Liao, 2000
- Oxyrhynchaxius manningi Lin, Kensley, & Chan, 2000
- Paralomis manningi Williams, Smith, & Baco, 2000
- Pontonia manningi Fransen, 2000
- Raninella manningi Bishops & Williams, 2000
- Raylilia Galil, 2001
- Raymanninus Ng, 2000
- Raymunida Macpherson & Machordam, 2000
- Raysquilla manningi Ahyong, 2000
- Raysquilla Ahyong, 2000
- Raytheres Campos, 2002
- Sergia manningorum Froglia & Gramitto, 2000
- Thor manningi Chace, 1972
- Trizocheles manningi Forest, 1986
- Typton manningi Bruce, 2000
- Uroptychus raymondi Baba, 2000

Taxa named by Manning include:

- Acantholambrus Manning, 1980
- Acantholambrus baumi Blow & Manning, 1996
- Biffarius Manning & Felder, 1991
- Chaceon fenneri (Manning & Holthuis, 1984)
- Erythrosquilla Manning & Bruce, 1984
- Erythrosquilla megalops Manning & Bruce, 1984
- Erythrosquillidae Manning & Bruce, 1984
- Erythrosquilloidea Manning & Bruce, 1984
- Eurysquillidae Manning, 1977
- Eurysquilloidea Manning, 1977
- Gonodactylaceus Manning, 1995
- Gonodactylellus Manning, 1995
- Mithraculus cinctimanus Stimpson, 1860
- Neogonodactylus Manning, 1995
- Neotrypaea Manning & Felder, 1991
- Nephropides Manning, 1969
- Nephropides caribaeus Manning, 1969
- Odontodactylidae Manning, 1980
- Parasquillidae Manning, 1995
- Parhippolyte sterreri (Hart & Manning, 1981)
- Platysquilla Manning, 1967
- Procarididae Chace & Manning, 1972
- Procaridoidea Chace & Manning, 1972
- Procaris Chace & Manning, 1972
- Procaris ascensionis Chace & Manning, 1972
- Procaris chacei Hart & Manning, 1986
- Rissoides Manning & Lewinsohn, 1982
- Sakaila Manning & Holthuis, 1981
- Somersiella Hart & Manning, 1981
- Tetrasquilla Manning & Chace, 1990
- Tetrasquillidae Manning & Camp, 1993
- Typhlatya iliffei Hart & Manning, 1981
- Typhlatya rogersi Chace & Manning, 1972

== See also ==
- Taxa named by Raymond B. Manning.
