= Parasquillidae =

Scientific classification
- Kingdom: Animalia
- Phylum: Arthropoda
- Clade: Pancrustacea
- Class: Malacostraca
- Order: Stomatopoda
- Suborder: Unipeltata
- Superfamily: Parasquilloidea; Ahyong & Harling, 2000
- Family: Parasquillidae; Manning, 1995

Genera
- Faughnia Serène, 1962; Parasquilla Manning, 1961; Pseudosquillopsis Serène, 1962

Family of crustaceans

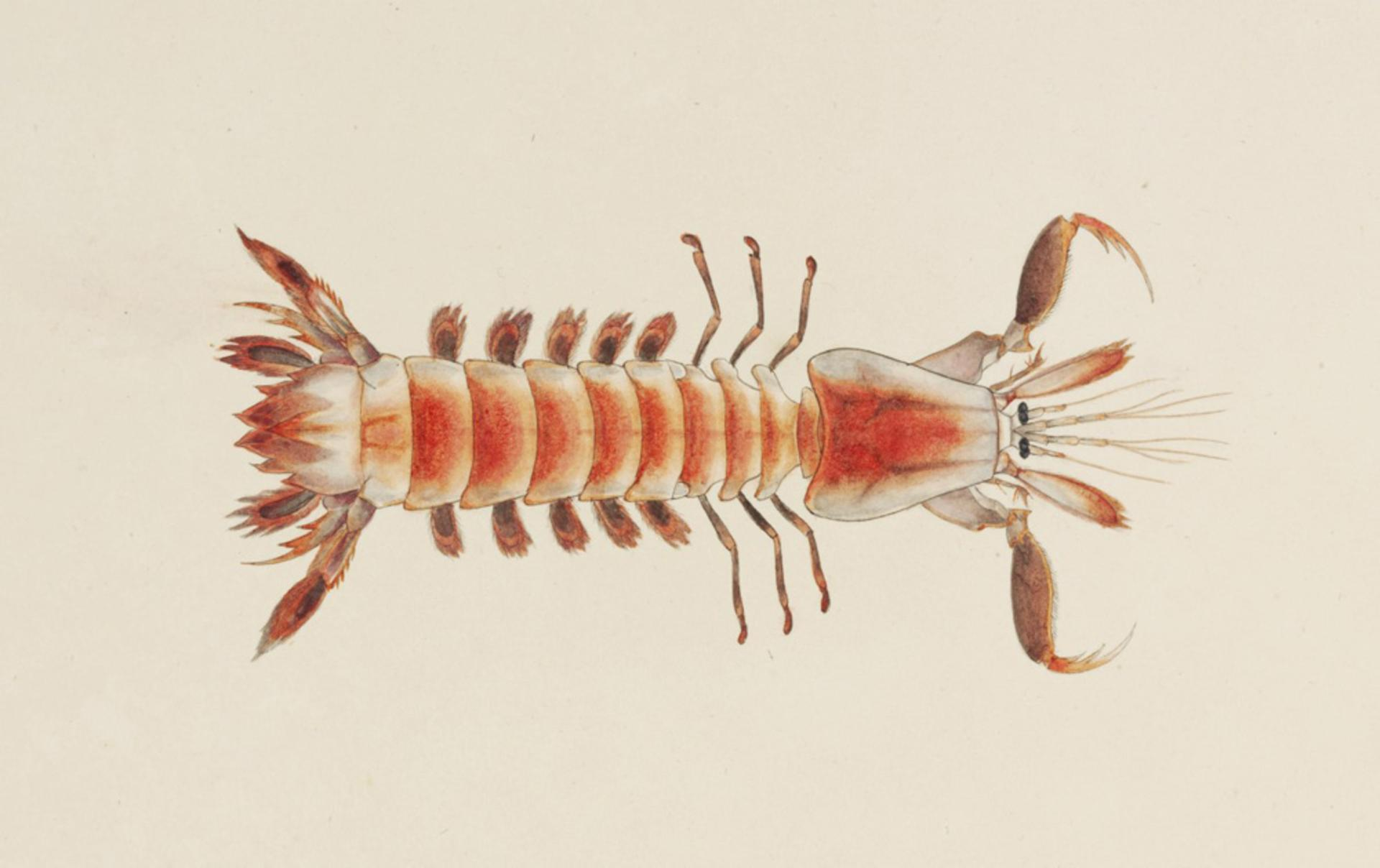
Parasquilla haani painted by Kawahara Keiga in the period 1823 - 1829. Siebold Collection.

Parasquillidae is a family of mantis shrimp containing the three genera Faughnia, Parasquilla and Pseudosquillopsis. It was previously included in the superfamily Gonodactyloidea, but that group was found to be paraphyletic, and a new superfamily, Parasquilloidea was erected.
