= Typhlatya rogersi =

Scientific classification
- Domain: Eukaryota
- Kingdom: Animalia
- Phylum: Arthropoda
- Class: Malacostraca
- Order: Decapoda
- Suborder: Pleocyemata
- Infraorder: Caridea
- Family: Atyidae
- Genus: Typhlatya
- Species: T. rogersi

Binomial name
- Typhlatya rogersi Chace & Manning, 1972

Species of crustacean

Typhlatya rogersi is a species of basket shrimp in the family Atyidae. It is found in South America and Africa.
