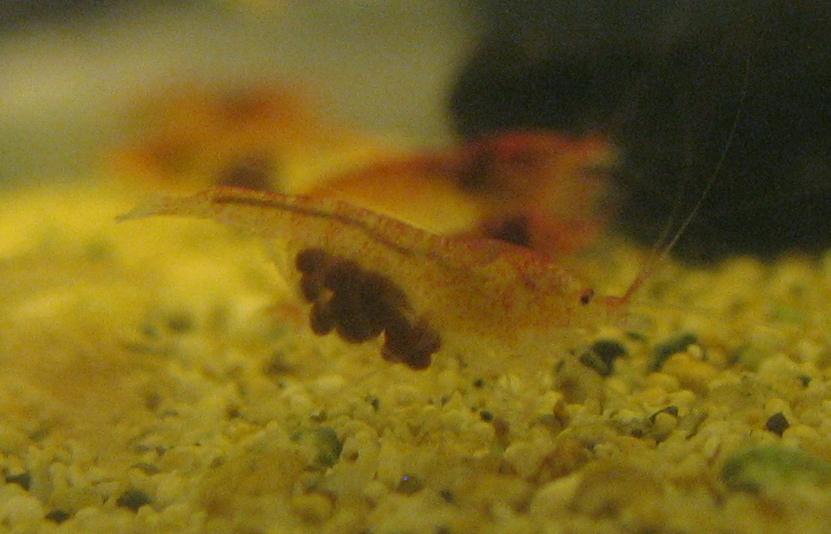
- Halocaridina rubra

Scientific classification
- Domain: Eukaryota
- Kingdom: Animalia
- Phylum: Arthropoda
- Class: Malacostraca
- Order: Decapoda
- Suborder: Pleocyemata
- Infraorder: Caridea
- Family: Atyidae
- Genus: Halocaridina; Holthuis, 1963

Species
- H. palahemo Kensley & D. Williams, 1986; H. rubra Holthuis, 1963

= Halocaridina =

Genus of crustaceans

Halocaridina is a genus of atyid shrimp. It contains two species – Halocaridina rubra and Halocaridina palahemo – both endemic to Hawaii. H. rubra is widely kept in aquaria.
