= Alima pacifica =

Scientific classification
- Kingdom: Animalia
- Phylum: Arthropoda
- Class: Malacostraca
- Order: Stomatopoda
- Family: Squillidae
- Genus: Alima
- Species: A. pacifica

Binomial name
- Alima pacifica Ahyong, 2001

Species of shrimp

Holotype site: USNM 169142 - male, Lizard Island'"`UNIQ--ref-00000006-QINU`"''"`UNIQ--ref-00000007-QINU`"'

Alima pacifica is a species of shrimp in the Squillidae family, and was first described in 2001 by Shane Ahyong.

It is a benthic shrimp and found in tropical waters off Indonesia and Australia.

The developmental connection between the larval and adult form had not been fully confirmed despite the frequent presence of late stage larvae in the Alima pacifica species. However, in a 2013 research study led by Kathryn Feller, DNA barcoding of the cytochrome oxidase, or COI, gene matched the larval state to the late-stage larvae, confirming some sort of evolutionary relationship between these larvae along with the Alima pacifica genus.
