= Miyakea (disambiguation) =

Miyakea is a genus of moths in the family Crambidae

Miyakea may also refer to:

- Miyakea, a genus of plants in the family Ranunculaceae, now called Pulsatilla
- Miyakea, a genus of mantis shrimp in the family Squillidae, now called Miyakella
