= Oratosquilla fabricii =

Scientific classification
- Kingdom: Animalia
- Phylum: Arthropoda
- Clade: Pancrustacea
- Class: Malacostraca
- Order: Stomatopoda
- Family: Squillidae
- Genus: Oratosquilla
- Species: O. fabricii

Binomial name
- Oratosquilla fabricii (Holthuis, 1941)

Synonyms
- Squilla calumnia Townsley, 1953

Species of mantis shrimp

Oratosquilla fabricii is a species of mantis shrimp found in the Indo-Pacific. Like other members of its order it has a powerful spear, which it uses to hunt invertebrates and small fish. It grows to a length of 175 millimetres (6.9 in), and lives at depths of 0–135 metres (0–443 ft).

== Reproduction and life cycle ==
Some members of the order Stomatopoda pair for life and some come together only to mate. Males produce sperm ducts rather than spermatophores; females can brood a maximum of 50,000 eggs. Life cycle: Eggs hatch to a planktonic zoea which lasts for 3 months.
