= Alima neptuni =

Scientific classification
- Kingdom: Animalia
- Phylum: Arthropoda
- Class: Malacostraca
- Order: Stomatopoda
- Family: Squillidae
- Genus: Alima
- Species: A. neptuni

Binomial name
- Alima neptuni (Linnaeus, 1768)

Synonyms
- Cancer Neptuni Linnaeus, 1768 (Cancer) Astacus neptuni Herbst, 1793; Alima hyalina Leach, 1817; Erichthus hyalinus Schinz, 1823; Squilla (Alima) hyalina Voigt, 1836; Alima angusta Dana, 1852; Hyalopelta gracilis Guerin-Meneville, 1857; Alima gracilis Claus, 1871; Squilla alba Bigelow, 1893; Alima angustata Manning, 1962; Alima alba Manning and Serene, 1968

Species of shrimp

Alima neptuni is a species of shrimp in the Squillidae family, and was first described in 1768 by Carl Linnaeus as Cancer neptuni.

It is found in all tropical seas with the exception of the eastern Pacific Ocean.

== Taxonomy ==
The species was first described in 1768 by Linnaeus as Cancer neptuni. It was redescribed in 1893 by Robert Payne Bigelow as Squilla alba. In 1986 Raymond Manning and Chanan Lewinsohn assigned it to the genus Alima with the species name Alima neptuni, and synonymised A alba, and A. hyalina and various other shrimps with A. neptuni. In 1998 Joseph Poupin described it as Alima alba. The most recent description (as A. neptuni) was in 2002 by Shane Ahyong.
