= Alima maxima =

Scientific classification
- Kingdom: Animalia
- Phylum: Arthropoda
- Clade: Pancrustacea
- Class: Malacostraca
- Order: Stomatopoda
- Family: Squillidae
- Genus: Alima
- Species: A. maxima

Binomial name
- Alima maxima Ahyong, 2002

Species of shrimp

Holotype site: USNM 306029 - Molokai

Alima maxima is a species of shrimp in the Squillidae family, and was first described in 2002 by Shane Ahyong.

It is a benthic, tropical shrimp and found at depths from 95–188 m in the Eastern Central Pacific.
