= Erugosquilla septemdentata =

Scientific classification
- Domain: Eukaryota
- Kingdom: Animalia
- Phylum: Arthropoda
- Class: Malacostraca
- Order: Stomatopoda
- Family: Squillidae
- Genus: Erugosquilla
- Species: E. septemdentata

Binomial name
- Erugosquilla septemdentata (Ahyong, 1994)

Synonyms
- Oratosquilla septemdentata Ahyong, 1994

Species of shrimp

Erugosquilla septemdentata is a species of shrimp in the family, Squillidae, and was first described in 1994 by Shane T. Ahyong as Oratosquilla septemdentata. The name was revised to Erugosquilla septemdentata in 1995 by Raymond B. Manning.

It is a benthic, tropical species, and found at depths exceeding 400 m.
