= Framji =

Framji is a given name. Notable people with the name include:

- Framji Cowasji Banaji (1767–1851), Indian merchant
- Boman Framji Chhapgar (1931–201), Indian marine biologist
- Dosabhai Framji Karaka (1829–1902), Indian newspaper editor
