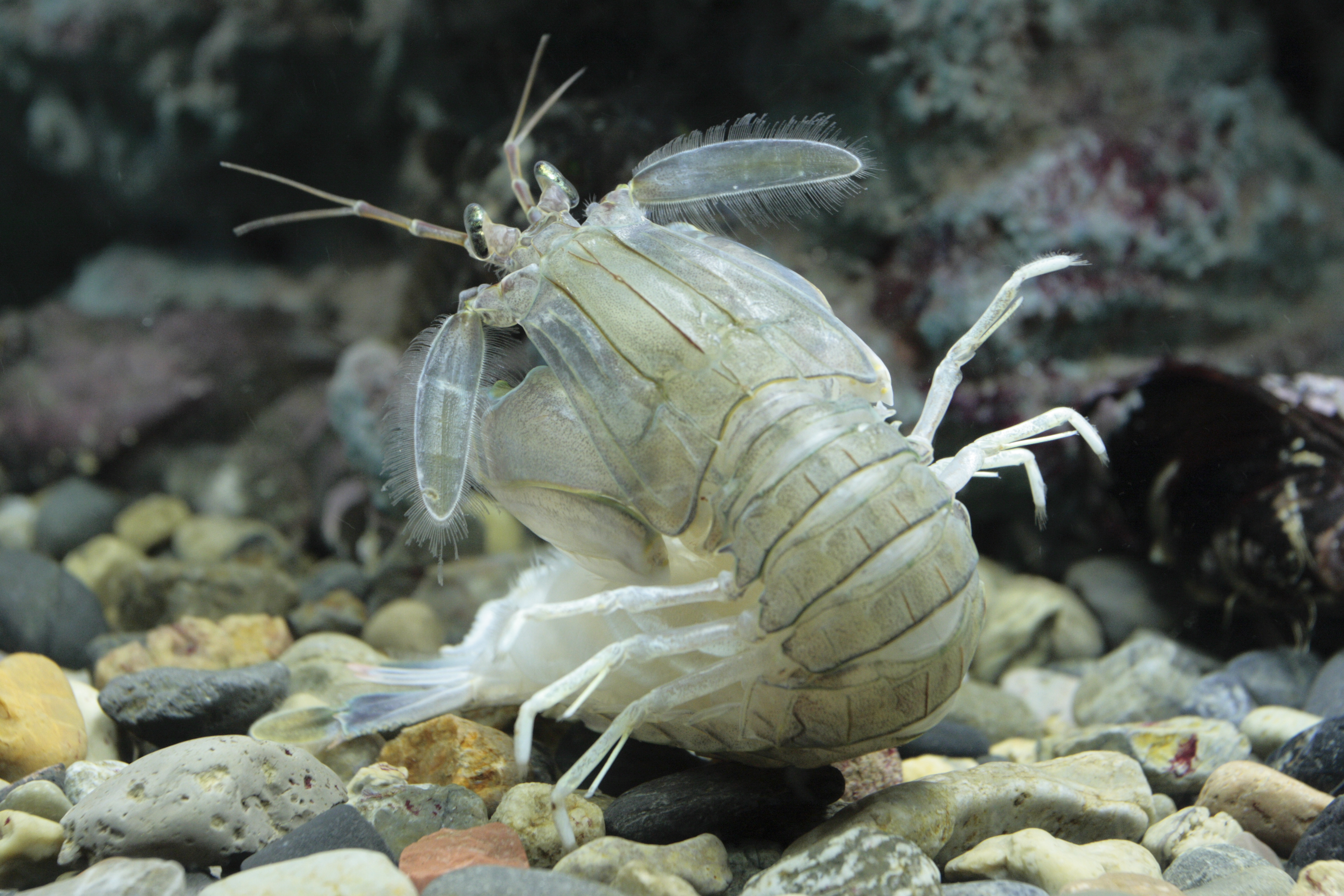

Scientific classification
- Kingdom: Animalia
- Phylum: Arthropoda
- Clade: Pancrustacea
- Class: Malacostraca
- Order: Stomatopoda
- Family: Squillidae
- Genus: Oratosquilla
- Species: O. oratoria

Binomial name
- Oratosquilla oratoria (De Haan, 1844)

Synonyms
- Squilla oratoria De Haan, 1844

= Oratosquilla oratoria =

Species of crustacean

Oratosquilla oratoria, commonly known as the Japanese mantis shrimp, is a species of mantis shrimp found in the western Pacific. It is known as shako in Japan, where it is widely harvested and eaten as sushi. This species is an important commercial fishing target and widely consumed in many countries along the coast of the Northwest Pacific Ocean.

It is a secondary consumer in its natural habitats, preying upon small creatures and being eaten by large fish and Cephalopods. Like other members of its order it has a powerful spear, which it uses to hunt invertebrates and small fish. It grows to a length of 185 millimetres (7.3 in), and lives at depths of 10–100 metres (33–328 ft).

It lives in burrows on the muddy seafloor and conducts most of its activities inside those burrows, including spawning and feeding, for predator protection. This species has great temperature tolerance. Through altering its metabolic pathways it can regulate temperature sensitivity, allowing it to occupy a wide range of habitats. This species has been observed outside of its native range. It is now considered an invasive species in both New Zealand and Australia. Similar environmental conditions of the habitats, including muddy estuaries, have promoted the establishment of new invasive populations.

Similar to other Stomatopods, mantis shrimp possess highly specialized sensory systems to facilitate hunting and mating. Its complex compound eyes allow it to detect a broad spectrum of wavelengths, even ultraviolet and polarized light. The sensitivity of its visual system, however, makes this species potentially vulnerable to artificial polarized light pollution. It also relies on sensitive antennules with a chemoreceptor to detect chemical cues dissolved in the water.

Its normal population distribution is influenced by density, since cannibalism is possible when other food sources are scarce. During the mating season of late spring and early summer, males and females perform intricate social behavior. Then, females lay and nurse their eggs in the burrows until the larvae hatch. Being pelagic instead of benthic, the larval stage of this species adopts a reflective camouflage called eyeshine as crypsis.

== Habitat ==
=== Environmental conditions ===
==== Geographic ranges ====
Japanese mantis shrimp typically reside in a wide variety of habitats including the shore, coral reefs, and level substrates. It is native to the Northwestern Pacific in the oceans near Korea, Japan, Taiwan, China, and Vietnam. This species can be found in temperate, sub-tropical, and tropical regions, with water temperature ranging from −1°C in northern Japan during winter to >30°C in the South China Sea during summer.

==== Temperature tolerance ====
Cold temperature can alter the physiological processes of this species at the cellular level, including metabolism, immune response, and reproduction. Low temperature slows down lipid metabolism shifting its metabolic mode from lipid oxidation to a carbohydrate-based metabolic pathway in order to maintain ATP production and support the survival of cells in a low-temperature environment. Cold temperature also imposes pressure on the immune system and induces expression changes of related genes. By enhancing antioxidant capacity, maintaining protein stability, and promoting immunity, the individual's tolerance to cold stress is further strengthened. In addition, cold temperatures can disrupt reproductive behaviors by reducing the expression of genes related to sex hormones and vision.

==== Adaptations to darkness ====
The Japanese mantis shrimp can adapt to the dark environment. It reduces the metabolism rate by downregulating several key genes controlling the gluconeogenesis pathways and other metabolic activities. This means it will conserve its energy and redirect energy toward growth and development. Genes that promote cell proliferation and differentiation show upregulation. Individuals that stay in a darker environment can increase tissue composition and may grow faster. Adaptations of sensory systems are also involved, especially for vision. Genes related to eye development and perception are all significantly affected, along with evidence of retinal adaptation.

=== Invasion ===
In recent years, the Japanese mantis shrimp has been artificially introduced to oceanic waters near Australia and New Zealand where it has become an invasive species. As an invasive species in New Zealand, the Japanese mantis shrimp was first observed in the Kaipara Harbour in 2009, and further observations have confirmed its distribution expansion to both the east and west coasts of the North Island. Japanese mantis shrimp prefer seafloors with muddy sediments, which is consistent with the local environments of those invaded estuaries. Macrofaunal species diversity in those sites is low, but the Japanese mantis shrimp may still act as an active bioturbator through burrowing, predation of small fish and invertebrates, and prey of large fish. Anthropogenic sediment input into the harbor may provide more available habitats for Japanese mantis shrimp, and its temperature tolerance range is wider than the actual measured water temperatures around New Zealand.

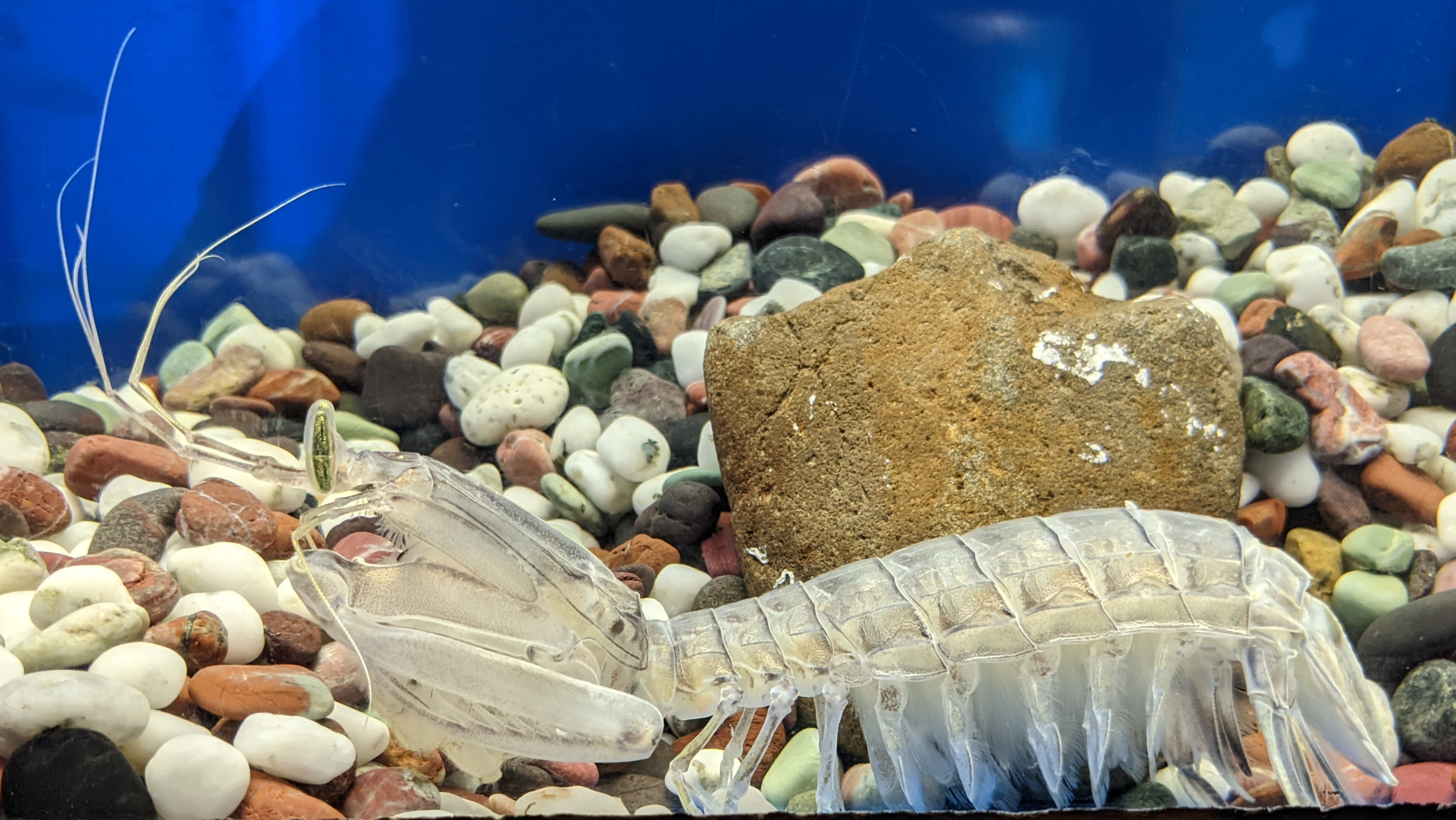
Oratosquilla oratoria in aquarium

=== Burrowing ===
The Japanese mantis shrimp typically resides on the muddy seafloor composed of silt and clay at a depth of less than 40 meters. It occupies long, U-shaped burrows in soft sediments, which it excavates with its maxillipeds. Similar to other species in the genus Oratosquilla, the Japanese mantis shrimp starts the construction of a burrow by removing sediments using its maxilliped, positioning sediments below its abdomen, and dispersing them backward with its pleopods. When the hole is 3-4 centimeters deep, the Japanese mantis shrimp dives in for further digging, where it makes a 90° turn to build a horizontal tube. This causes the burrow to have a distinctive elongated part in the vertical direction below the entrance. When the construction is finished, the Japanese mantis shrimp uses a cap made of sediments and self-produced secretion, with a nearly invisible hole in the center, to cover both entrances.

It stays tucked away within these burrows in the daylight hours for refuge. and rarely emerges except at night. Most of the day, it stays at the entrance, with only its eyes and antennules protruding out. The horizontal section has a diameter greater than the Japanese mantis shrimp itself, and its length is proportional to the size of the dweller.

Most daily activities are conducted here for convenience and safety. These burrows are used to spawn and lay eggs in. The inner wall of the burrow is smooth, and the remains of prey are often scattered on the flat floor. A constricted area is found at the center of the horizontal tube that divides it into two segments. Since two individuals are not observed to share the same burrow, an extra chamber may serve as an additional refuge against predators. If the burrow is not of compatible size, egg laying is inhibited. As a result, if the burrow becomes too small, the Japanese mantis shrimp will expand it, or create a more suitably sized one.

== Hunting and diet ==
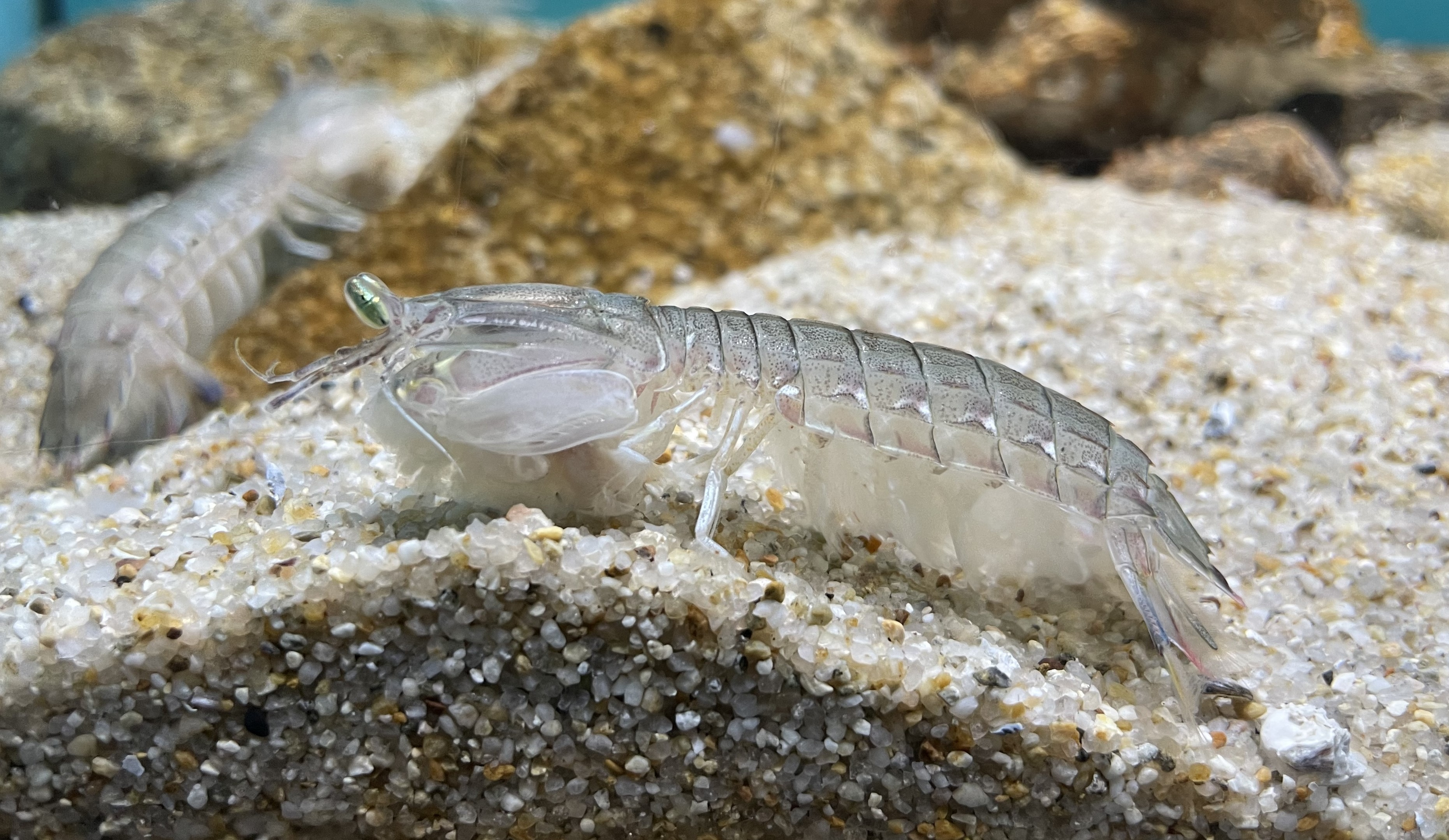
In Miyajima Public Aquarium, Japan

=== Prey capture ===
The Japanese mantis shrimp is regarded as a secondary consumer, feeding mainly on primary consumers. It is a predator that actively hunts and kills its prey. When it gets close to prey and recognizes it as the target for attack, it suddenly and rapidly launches the attack. At night it emerges from its burrow to hunt prey which it then brings back to their burrow in order to feed. It is considered to be a type in between spearer types, which use their claws to pierce soft bodied prey, and smasher types, which use a club to smash hard bodied prey. Such raptorial appendages allow it to capture a wide range of prey.

=== Food preference ===
It feeds on an assortment of organisms varying with habitat including crustaceans, mollusks, small rays, small fishes, worms and algae. Some researchers believe that the occasional presence of algae found in their stomach contents might have been ingested during the process of hunting. Similar to other Oratosquilla species, the Japanese mantis shrimp has shorter raptorial appendages and smaller eyes compared to other mantis shrimp species that are more specialized for hunting fish. In experimental tanks, the Oratosquilla species were observed to be less successful hunting for fish, and even if they catch fish, their appendages have difficulty fixing the prey for feeding. Gobiid fish were found in the stomach contents of wild Japanese mantis shrimp, indicating the mantis shrimp's ability to capture and consume fish. However, its hunting success often depends on whether its prey can respond and whether the prey can escape in time. Fish and shrimp are very mobile, followed by brachiopods and crabs, while mollusks are the least mobile and are thus more likely to be eaten by the mantis shrimps. Besides catching, fish have bony spines, and other crustaceans have a hard shell, which make them hard for the mantis shrimp to break using its mandibles. Although mollusks also have shells, large Japanese mantis shrimps were observed in the aquaria smashing the thick shell of Bivalvia and consuming the soft tissue inside. When encountering thin-shelled Bivalvia, it will break them up with its mandibles and consume the meat with fragments of shells. Juveniles and small individuals cannot break those hard shells as efficiently as large adults. Fish and Polychaeta also appear more frequently in large individuals' stomachs. Despite this potential preference, the exact prey choice is habitat- and environment-dependent.

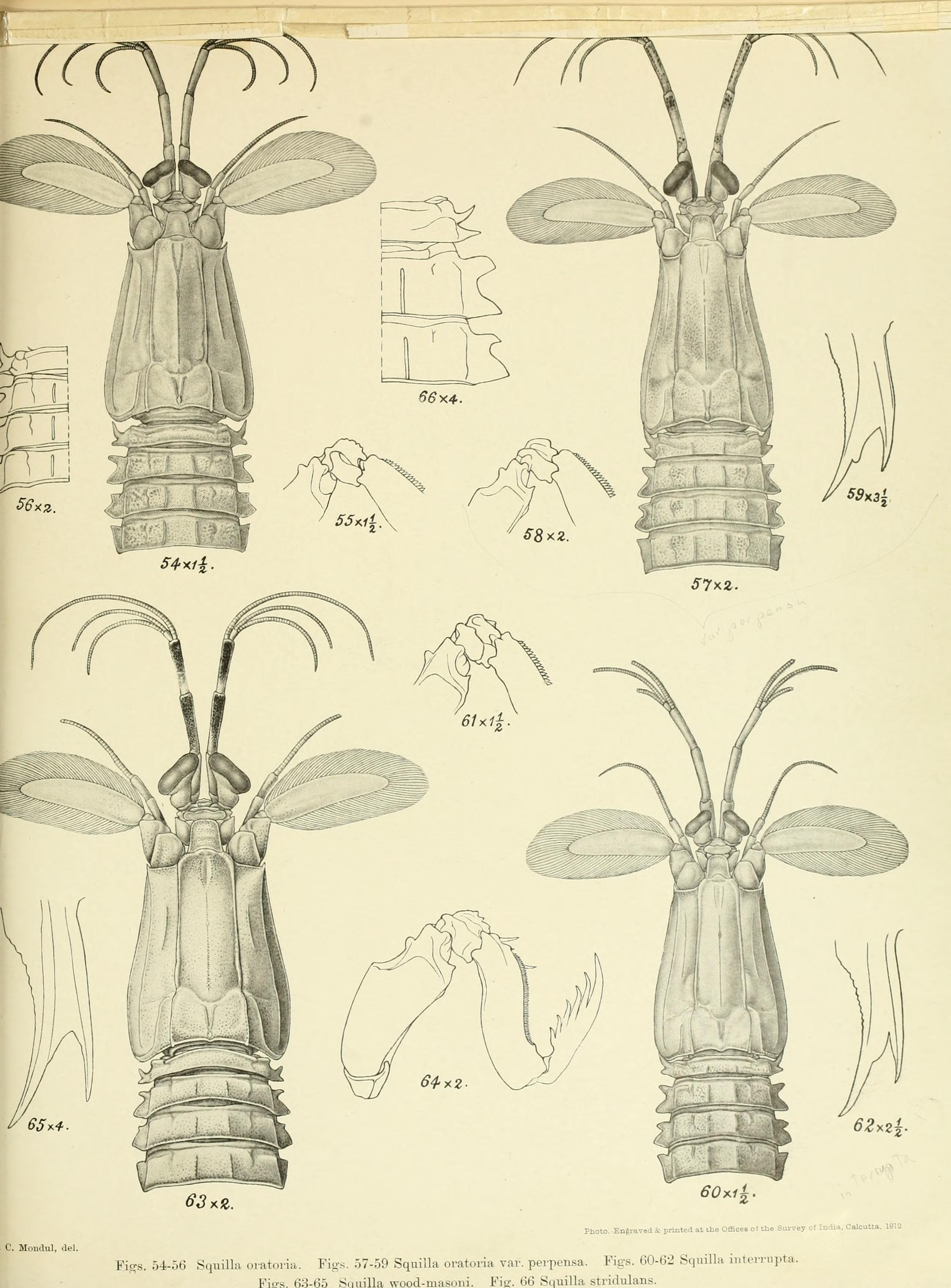
Raptorial appendages

=== Dietary switch and cannibalism ===
Before spawning, large females switch their diets to be more mollusk-based and reduce hunting for crustaceans. Nevertheless, the feeding intensity remains the same during the reproductive period. Instead of relying on active energy intake from ingestion for gametogenesis, female Japanese mantis shrimps are considered to be conservative, where much of the energy for gametogenesis comes from relocation of energy from muscles and hepatopancreas to gonads. During the period of sexual maturation, the amount of lipids and protein in muscles and hepatopancreas decreases, consistent with the highest value of lipids and protein content in gonads.

They have also been observed to cannibalize smaller members of their species in times of food scarcity. Though cannibalism plays an important part in the life of Japanese mantis shrimp, it requires less energy to capture and feed on other smaller prey rather than conducting cannibalism, since other mantis shrimps not only have a harder exoskeleton but also possess defensive weapons (predatory appendages), which makes them hard to subdue.

== Reproduction and life cycle ==
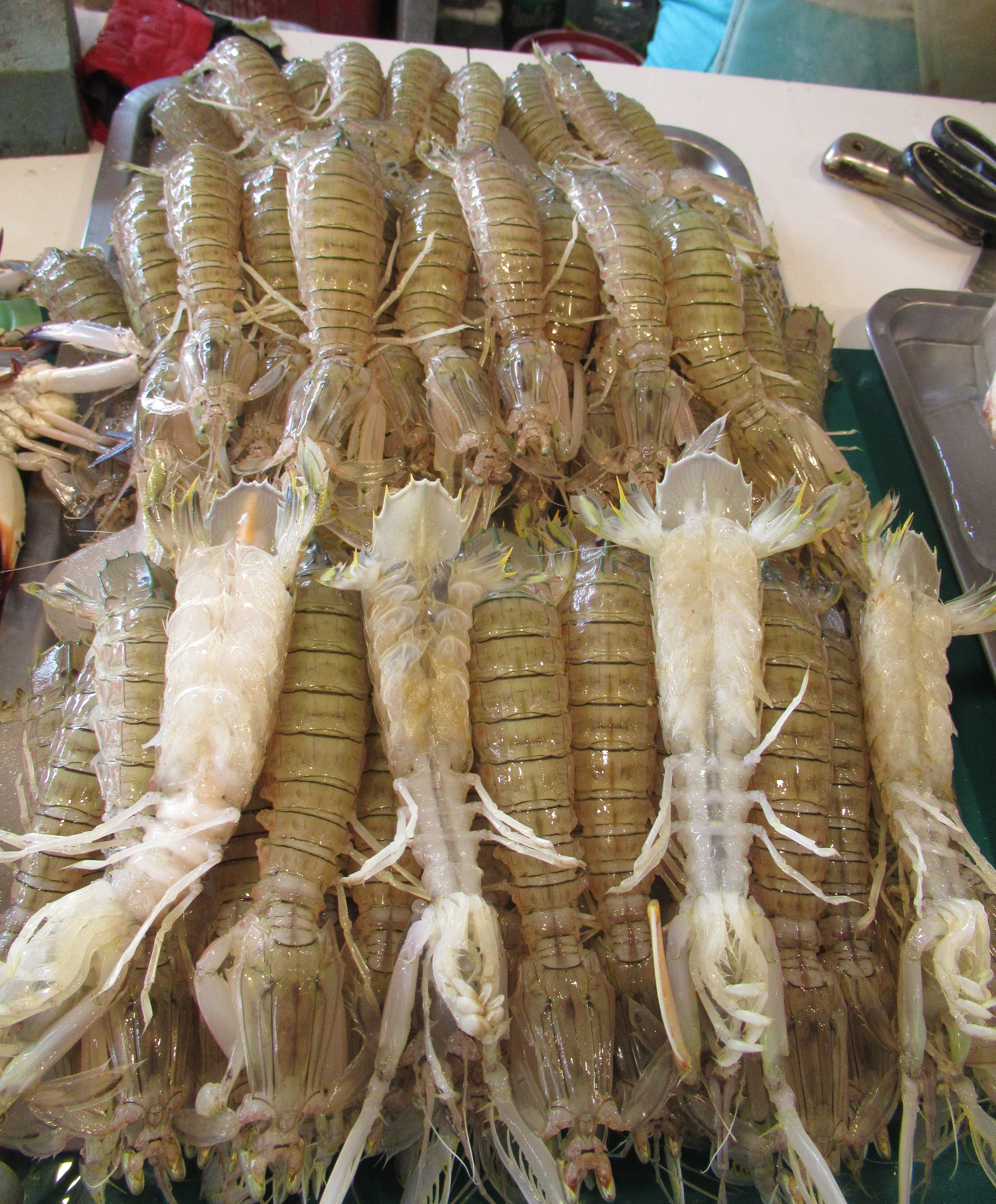
In the Philippines

=== Maturation and mating behavior ===
Reproduction for Japanese mantis shrimp occurs between mature inter-molt pairs. Female Japanese mantis shrimp achieve reproductive maturity by late spring to early summer lasting until fall while males have year round reproductive maturity. There are several behavioral components in its courtship. One mating behavior that it demonstrates is attenuation between male and female where they face each other and mutually stroke antennas for several seconds. They have also been found to engage in pair walking, where mates walk closely together side by side, and engage in brushing where the male brushes the female with its appendages.

=== Egg spawning ===
After fertilization the female spawn in the burrow and the female subsequently nurses the eggs until they hatch. As the ovarian shape of the ventral side of the telson turns into an isosceles triangle, females spawn eggs, and experimental manipulation has shown that increasing water temperature facilitates the maturation of the ovary. During spawning, females adopt a supine posture, using the dorsal parts of the first to fourth abdominal segments and both exopods of the uropods to attach themselves to the inner wall of the burrow tightly. They can remain in that posture motionless, except slightly elevated pleopods, until the spawning is completed after 125-217 minutes. Eggs are released from the central genital opening on the sixth abdominal segment and freely emerge onto the abdominal segments of the thorax. These eggs are connected to each other by a sticky substance, forming an egg string and, eventually, an egg mass with an irregular shape. Females stretch their bodies after completing the spawning, and start to press, through the rotational movement of maxillipeds, the egg masses into a spherical shape. Then, females alternately stretch and rotate the egg mass to transform it into a shape resembling a thick disc, and eventually shape it into a thin disc with a slightly raised edge, with only having a slight degree of stickiness. All these procedures usually occur and finish within 24 hours of spawning.

=== Egg nursing ===
Soon afterwards, females begin nursing the egg mass and use their maxillipeds to alternately push and withdraw the egg masses, along with unfolding and folding the egg masses. This nurturing behavior continues until the eggs hatch. However, the frequency decreases over time, so the egg masses gradually become loose and gradually become semi-transparent as the hatching progresses. Females devote significant periods of time to nursing their eggs and as a result rarely leave their burrows unless to feed. When emerging from their burrow the female carries her eggs in her maxillipeds for safekeeping. In the period shortly before the eggs hatch the female has been observed to neglect the eggs and feed more frequently. The abandoned egg masses are usually eaten by other individuals or slowly decay, and thus cannot hatch. The typical embryonic life of an egg is about 14 days.

=== Growth of larvae ===
The larvae of the Japanese mantis shrimp follows 11 larval stages, with active swimming and feeding beginning in the third larval stage. The specific growth stage of a larva can be determined by the number of body segments and the state of appendages. Before the third stage, larvae seldom or never actively swim but stay near the bottom of burrows. To feed, larvae repeatedly curl their bodies into a circle and then extend their raptorial claws to capture the prey. Positive phototaxis can be observed from the third to the final stage larvae, but that tendency disappears when they develop into juveniles and behave similarly to adults. The larval stage ends in around 32 to 51 days, and the juvenile stage begins.

== Migration and population dynamics ==
The Japanese mantis shrimp population in the Bohai is known to perform seasonal migration from shallow water at depths of less than 10 meters to deep water at about 30 meters in winter. In Tokyo Bay, due to oxygen deficiency in the lower water layer of the northern bay during the summer, its distribution shrinks to the southern bay. Its spatial distribution generally depends on population density; high density leads to habitat enlargement, while low density shrinks habitat size. Such sensitivity to density is likely due to the presence of cannibalism among individuals. High population density in an artificial breeding environment can lead to gonadal degeneration and other stress responses.

=== Abiotic factors ===
By studying the population of Japanese mantis shrimp in the Yangtze estuary, researchers have determined several natural or anthropogenic factors that can influence the population dynamics of this species. First, due to its reliance on muddy seafloor and habits of burrowing, the biomass of Japanese mantis shrimp increases with increasing natural discharge of sediments from the river. Nevertheless, human activities that alter sediment loads, such as dam building or deforestation, can negatively affect this ecological advantage and deteriorate habitat conditions. In contrast to sediments, runoff near the estuary negatively impacts the fitness of this species by diluting important nutrients dissolved in water. Both these two factors are directly controlled by seasonal monsoons, which directly regulate the Japanese mantis shrimp's population dynamics through nutrient circulation as well.

Besides effects on sediments, local fisheries are also known to harm this species, especially under the pressure of excessive fishing. Though its magnitude alone is not as large as those natural factors listed above, fishing can exert further influence when combined with the human-induced environment and temperature changes. Within the distribution range of this species, human activities have severely depleted fishery resources and reduced their recovery.

== Enemies ==
=== Natural predators ===
Large predatory fish are the major predators of adult Japanese mantis shrimp. The specific species vary depending on regions, including Japanese sea bass and red seabream in the western Pacific, and smooth-houndss and Australasian snapper in the southern Pacific, where the Japanese mantis shrimp was introduced. Besides fish, large cephalopods that prey on crustaceans, like the giant Pacific octopus, are also considered potential predators of this species. Juvenile Japanese mantis shrimps are preyed upon by yellowfin goby, Mimika bobtail squids, and crabs, but predation frequency is relatively low compared to other, more abundant prey items.

=== Protections against predators ===
The overall color of the Japanese mantis shrimp is light grey to light brown with dark red grooves running down the thorax and abdomen; The color of its posterior tips is dark green. Adult Japanese mantis shrimps are vulnerable to attacks from other individuals and predators when exposed on the flat seafloor. Therefore, they rely on their burrows to avoid predation, especially when focusing on feeding or spawning. For example, there was no observation for these behaviors being conducted outside the burrow in either the wild or artificial environments, and females preparing to lay eggs immediately stop spawning after being dragged out of their burrows. The elongated horizontal section of their burrows, though it requires more energy to construct, also provides extra survival benefits against various crustacean predators.

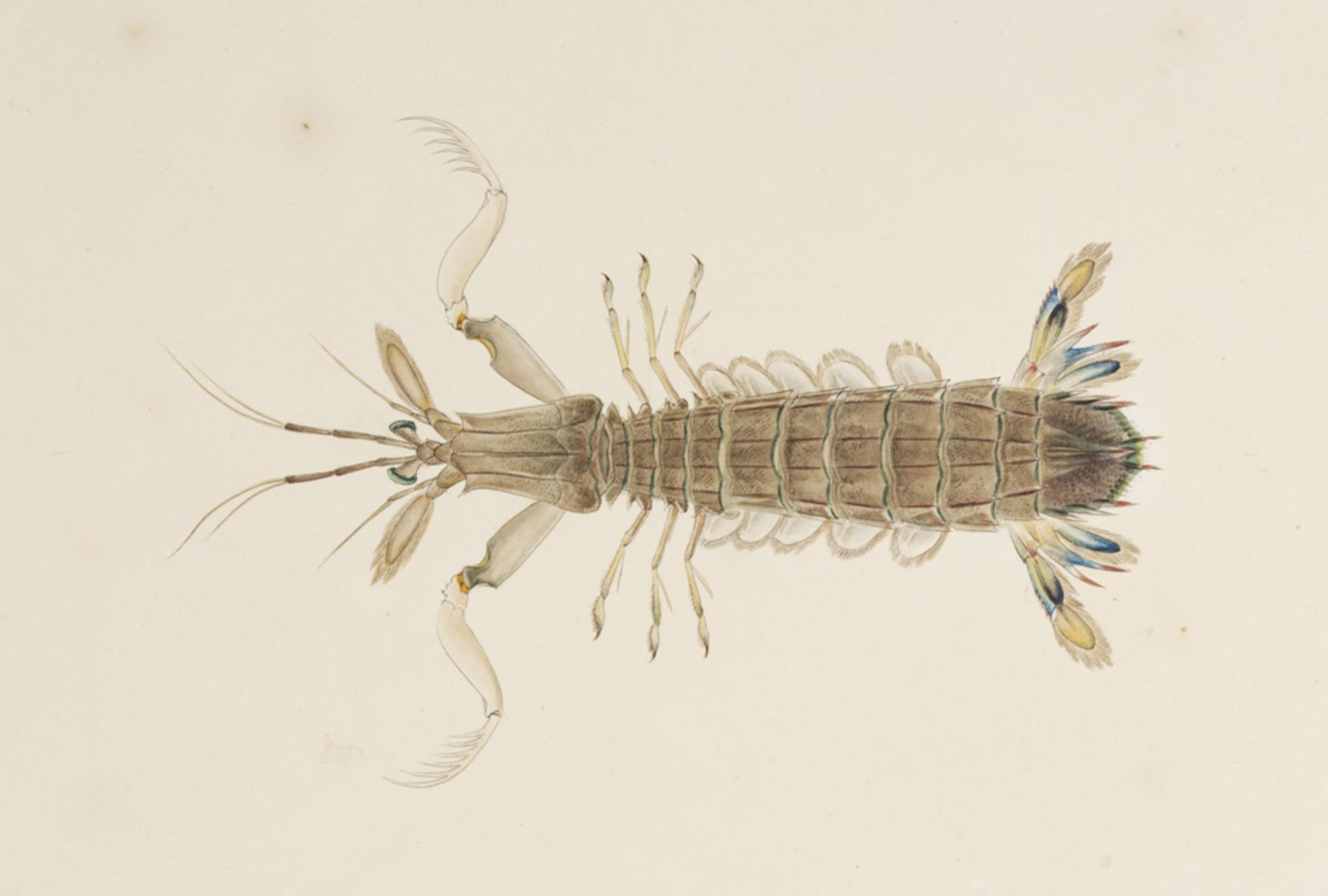
Overall appearance

For the more plegic larval stage, the most visible part to predators is the compound eyes due to the presence of opaque pigments. Similar to other Stomatopods, Japanese mantis shrimp larvae respond to that predation pressure by making the remaining body mostly transparent. The screening opaque pigments are needed for photoreceptors to maintain the resolution of the visual scene.Although the specific structure is unknown, their eyes possess a function called eyeshine, which can effectively reflect green or blue wavelengths of light. It serves as a reflective camouflage, by reducing the visual contrast between the eyes and the surrounding water background, to decrease the chance of larvae being detected. Moreover, this eyeshine can significantly reduce the visibility of the eyes under different observation angles, depths, and natural light conditions, especially in the deeper water layers where the larvae stay during the daytime.

== Genetics ==
Geographic separation and glacial-interglacial climate change during the mid-Pliocene created two divergent lineages of Japanese mantis shrimp. One lineage has adapted to the cold water temperature of the Bohai, Yellow Sea, and northern Japan Sea, facilitated by the China Coastal Current and the Korean Coastal Current. Another southern lineage has adapted to the warmer water in the East and South China Sea, along with the Kuroshio Current. These two lineages expanded their distributions in the late Pleistocene. Rising temperature and sea level during the interglacial period had created many inshore and shallow water habitats suitable for Japanese mantis shrimp. Following the reopening of the Tsushima Strait and reconnection between the South and East China Seas, both lineages colonized new regions, with the northern lineages entering the northern China coast, and the southern lineages reoccupying the East China Sea. Hybridization exists between these two lineages since they share habitats in the southern coast of Japan and the Yellow Sea, but without major morphological divergence, its extent is difficult to assess.

== Sensory system ==
=== Vision ===
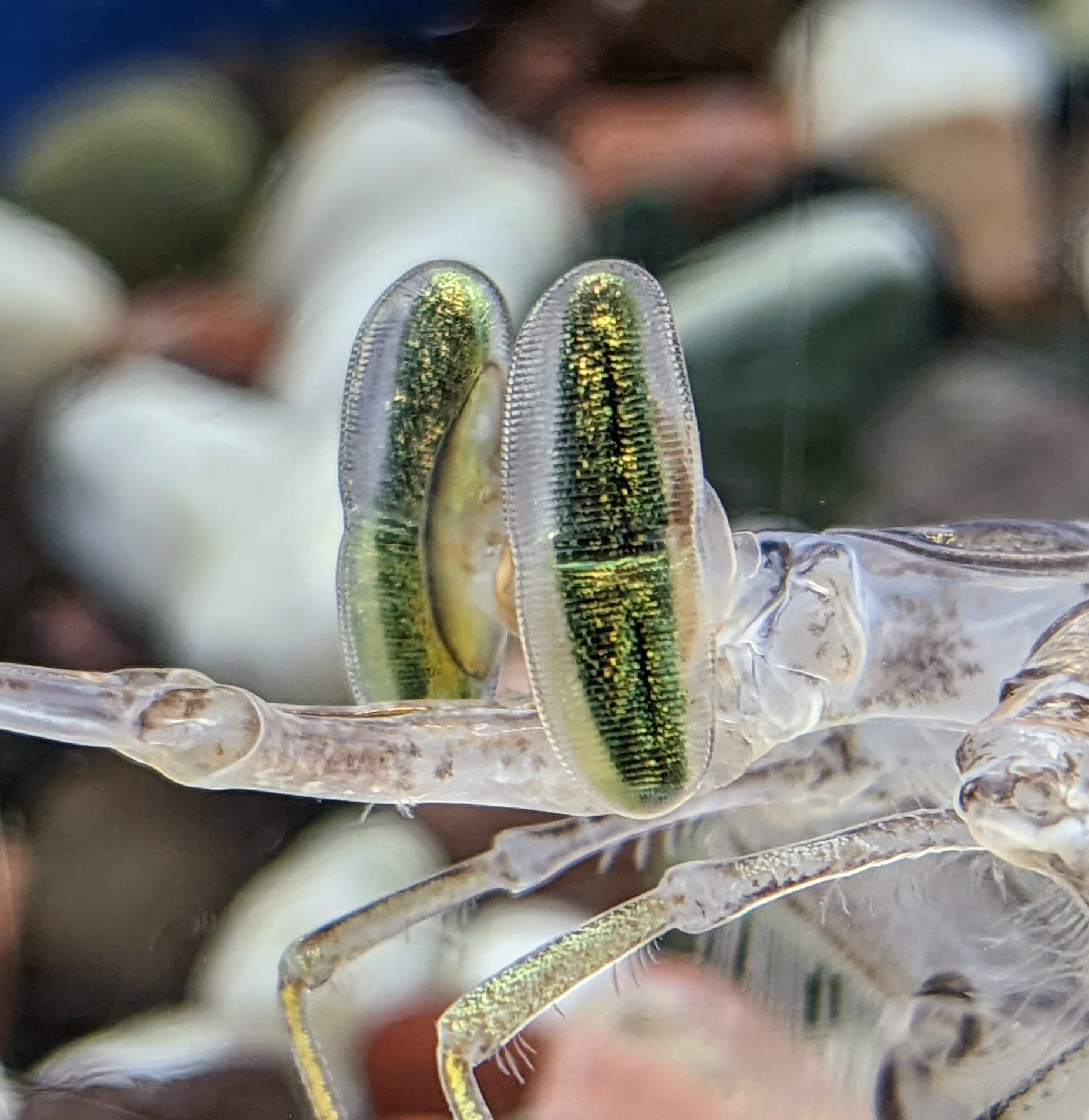
Eyes

The Japanese mantis shrimp has a complex visual system to facilitate hunting and mating. It can detect a wide range of wavelengths from ultraviolet to polarized light, so it is considered to have better color vision than many other animals and humans. The diversity of opsins in the eyes may partially explain why it has such excellent and broad color vision. On the other hand, polarized light detected by the eyes can help this species contrast between the target and background effectively in the dark seafloor. Its compound eyes contain thousands of light-sensing units, and each one of them is independent, allowing the mantis shrimp to capture slight changes in the surrounding environment. The compound eye can be divided into three parts: the dorsal hemisphere, the ventral hemisphere, and a band of small eyes in the middle. This unique structure gives this species trinocular vision.

=== Olfactory ===
Besides vision, the Japanese mantis shrimp has a pair of sensitive antennules as well. It senses prey and mates with the help of ionotropic receptors located on the antennules, which enable it to detect dissolved chemical cues in the surrounding water.

== In cuisine ==
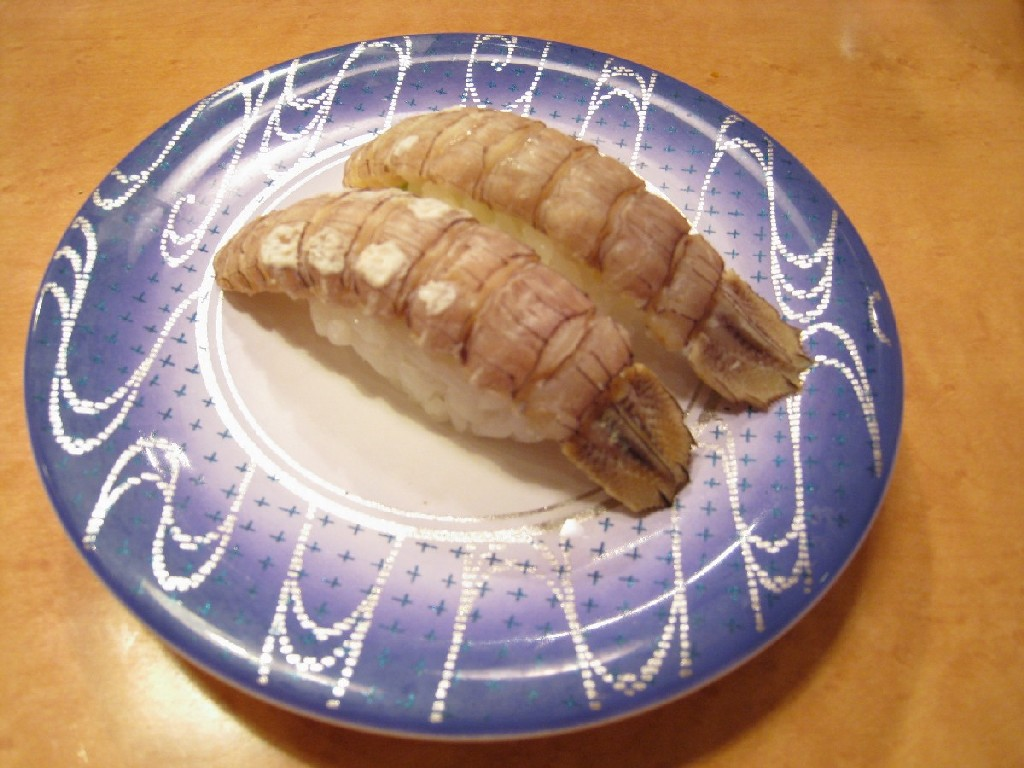
As sushi

In Japan, the species is called shako, and is commonly eaten.

Its consumption is mostly limited to Japan as the price and availability of it limits its popularity abroad. It is most tasty during the period of spring as it is their breeding season and is occasionally also eaten with its roe. Its texture and flavor is said to be somewhere in between eel and shrimp.

The appearance of shako in the form of sushi began in the 1950s where it was commonly brushed with nitsume (eel sauce) and presented as nigirizushi. Shako was originally prepared by boiling it in a sugar syrup, but is now typically prepared through a slow simmer allowing its freshness to last longer.

== Conservation ==
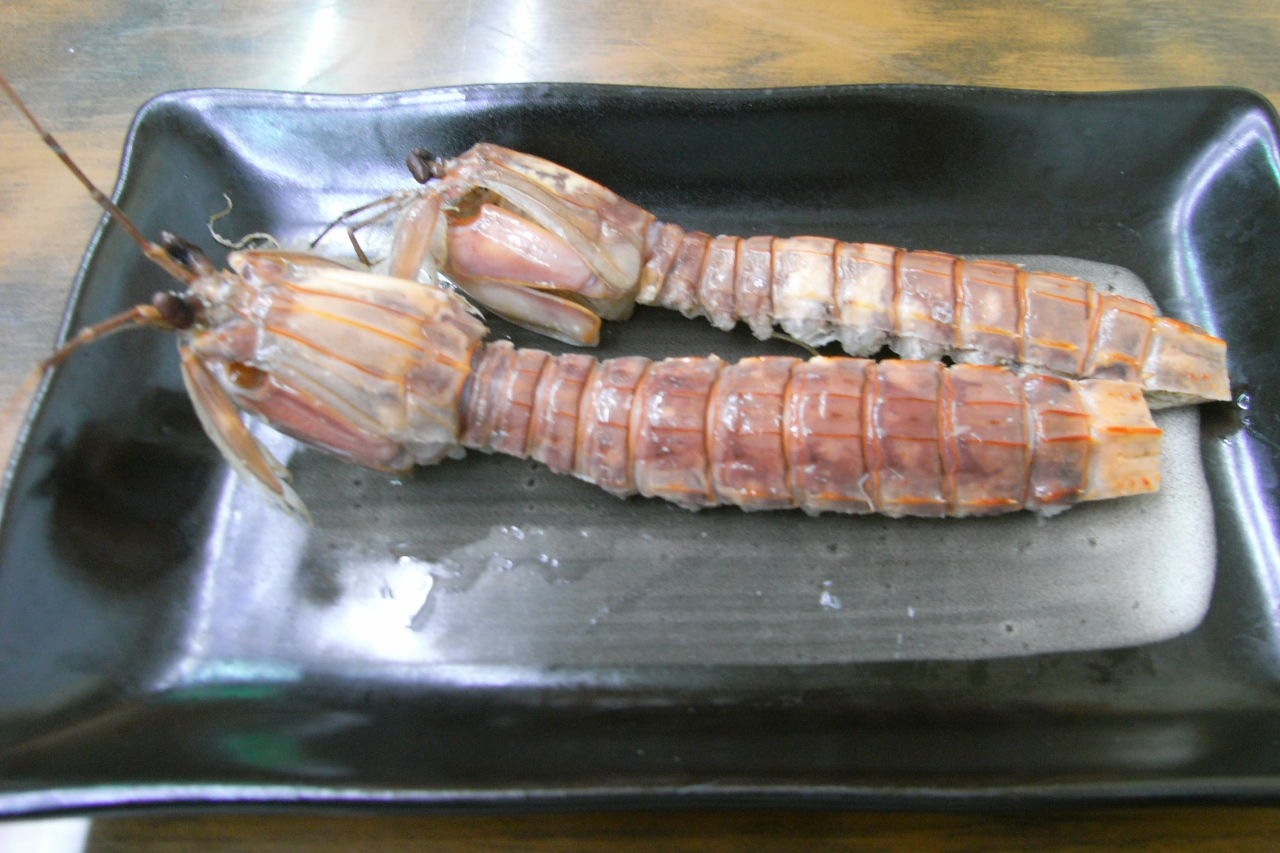
In cooking

Due to its taste and abundance, this species has experienced intense and unregulated fishery along the coast of the Northwest Pacific Ocean. As a natural resource, the Japanese mantis shrimp population has been overexploited in many Asian countries. Reduction in the number of large individuals due to overfishing causes smaller individuals to become breeding parents, and the spawning season was observed to be delayed to late May and even September since 2004.

=== Ecological trap ===
The Japanese mantis shrimp's compound eyes are sensitive to linearly polarized light (LPL), so artificial LPL sources from human architecture may create an ecological trap for it. According to comparative transcriptomics, vital genes involved in phototransduction are down-regulated in the LPL condition. This can negatively affect the normal development of retinal cells, the transmission of light signals, and the transformation of light signals into neural electrical signals, which all impair its visual ability. Regarding reproduction, several genes related to sperm production, maturation, and sex hormone release are also down-regulated in the LPL scenario. Therefore, LPL pollution may reduce the animal's reproductive efficiency by inhibiting the proliferation of reproductive cells, hormone release, and the process of gamete combination. Finally, researchers have observed down-regulation of immune-related genes when LPL pollution is present, including inflammatory responses, antioxidant defense, phagocytosis, and wound repair. This indicates that continual LPL stimulus will expend extra energy and result in malfunction of the immune system, eventually leading to reduced individual fitness.

== Gallery ==
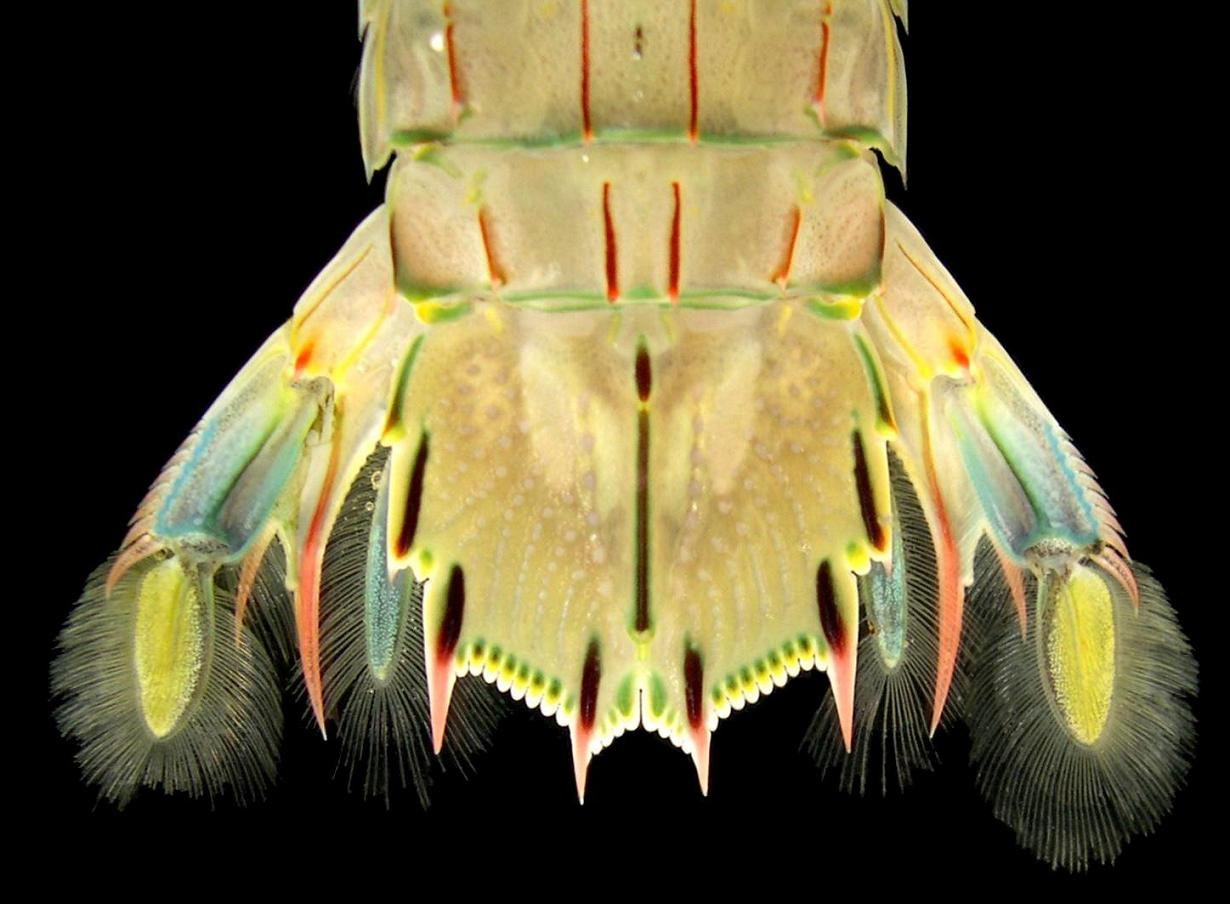
Close-up of the telson and uropods

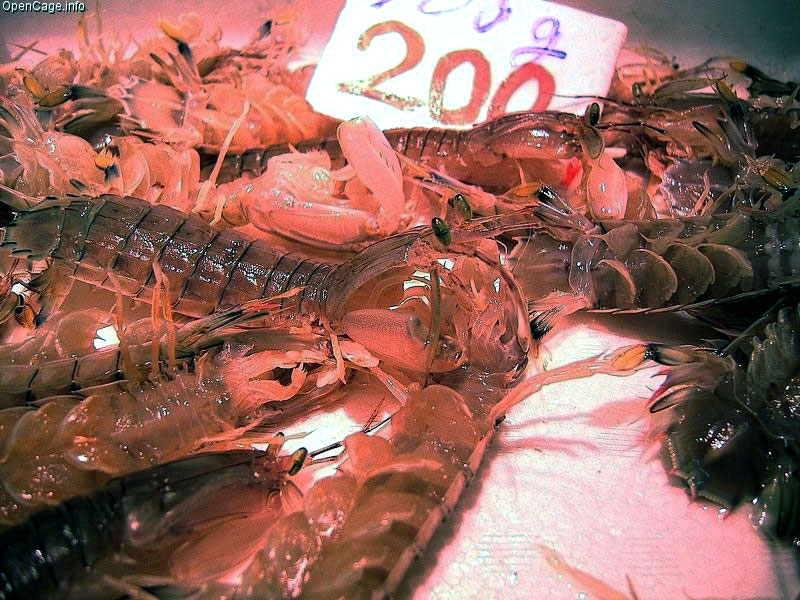
For sale at a Japanese market

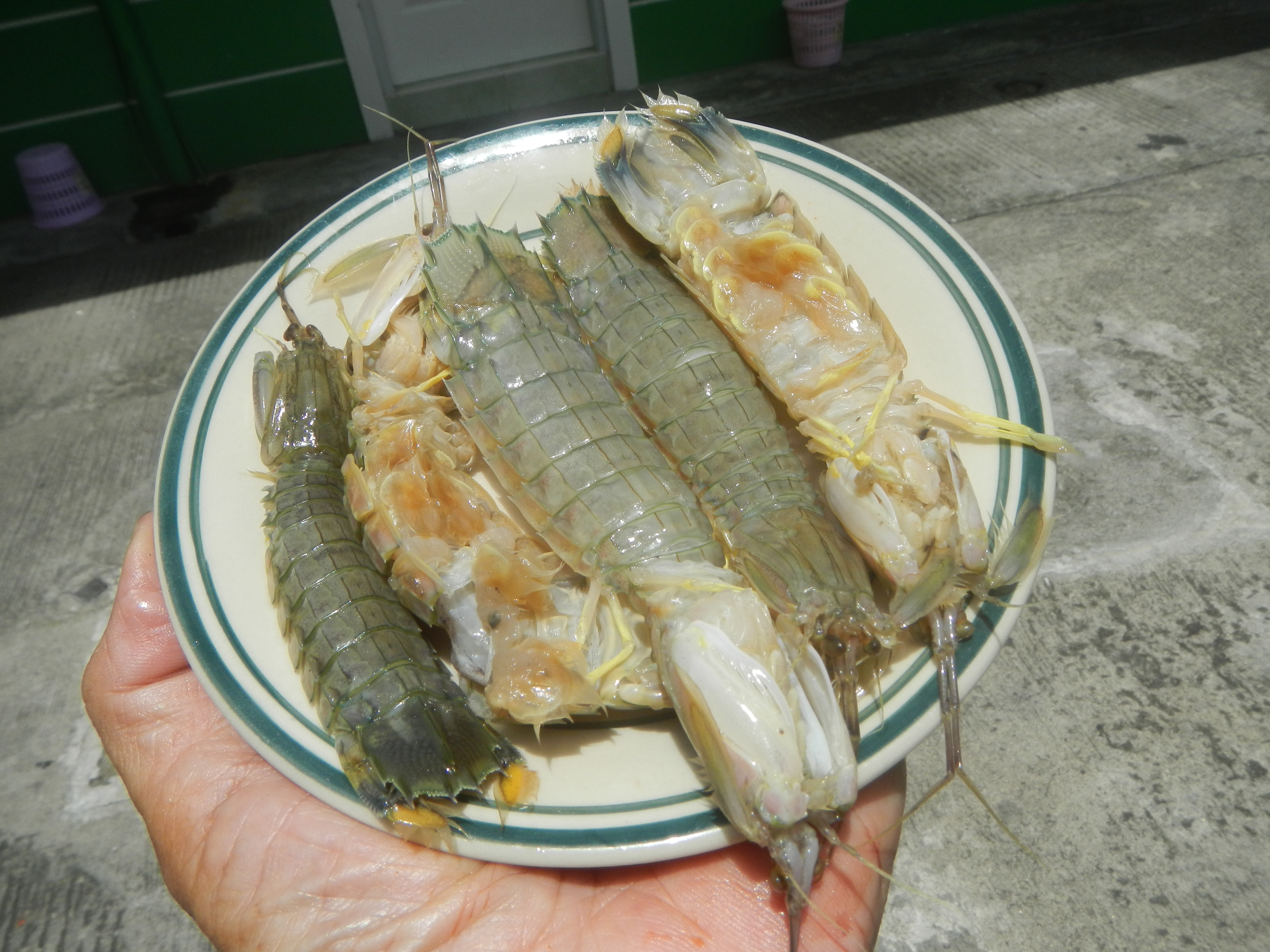
Raw

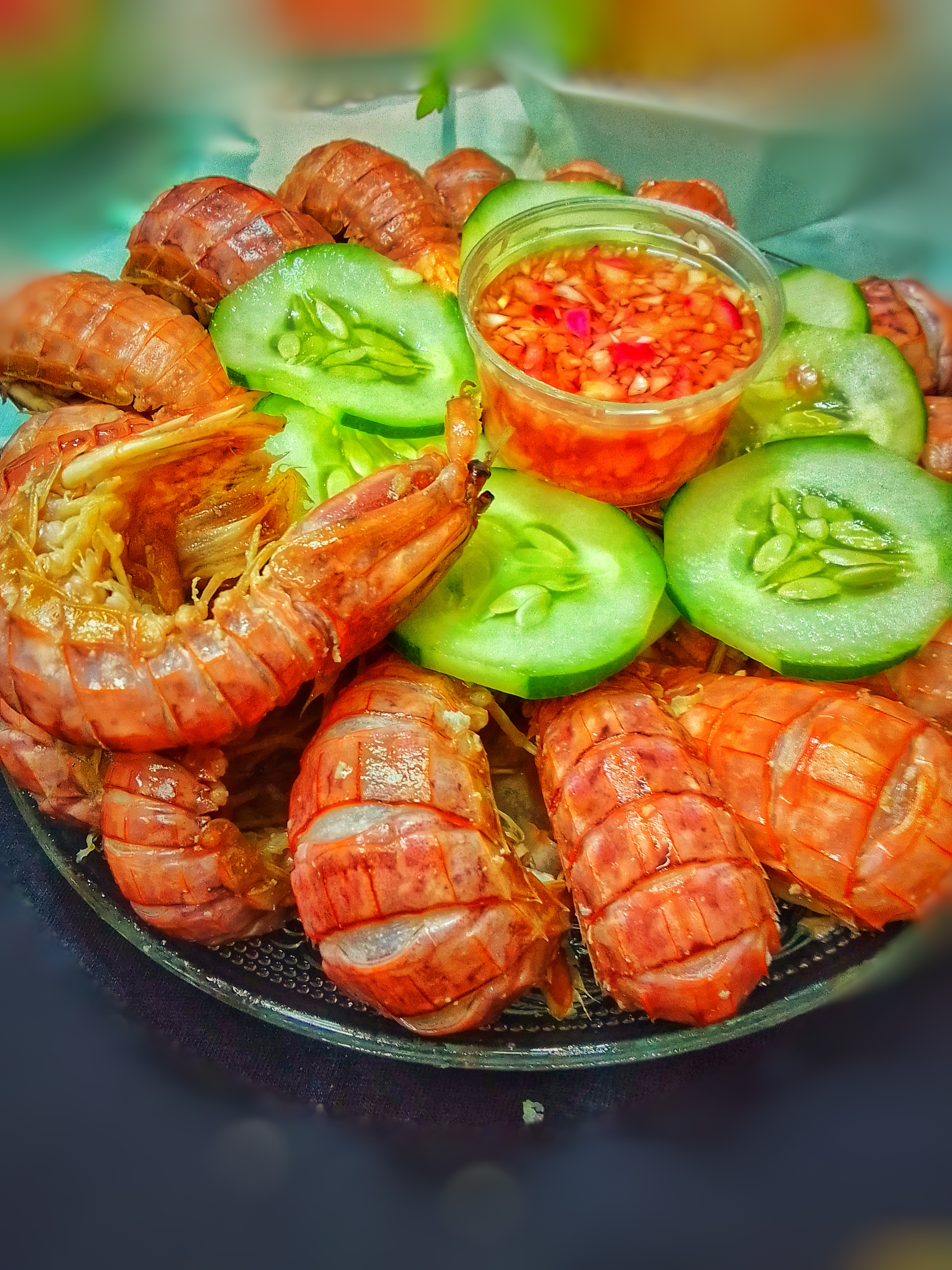
Cooked
