= Boman Framji Chhapgar =

Indian marine biologist

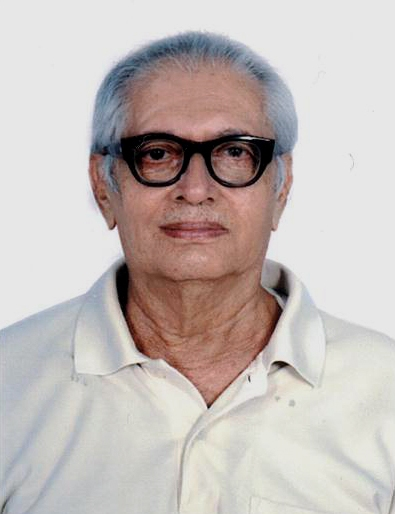
- Boman Framji Chhapgar
- Born: 1 January 1931 (age 94); Bombay
- Died: 5 August 2018
- Citizenship: India
- Scientific career
- Fields: Marine biology, carcinology

Boman Framji Chhapgar (1 January 1931 – 5 August 2018) was an Indian marine biologist who specialized in carcinology. The author of popular accounts on marine biology under the pen-name of "beefsea", several new species of crab, mantis shrimp and fishes have been described by him.

== Early life and education ==
Boman Framji Chhapgar was born on 1 January 1931 in Bombay to Parsi parents Banoobai and Framji Chhapgar. After completing school at Bharda New High School in 1944, he studied microbiology and zoology at St. Xavier's College, graduating in 1948 with microbiology as his main subject. He also obtained a second Bachelor of Science (Honours) degree from the Royal Institute of Science, Bombay with zoology. In 1951 he joined the Taraporewala Marine Biological Station (attached to the Taraporewala Aquarium), affiliated to the University of Bombay as its first MSc student. In 1954 he was awarded the Shri Vicaji D. B. Taraporevala Senior Research scholarship. He registered for a PhD in 1972 completing it in 1976. In 1957, he was selected for the UNESCO Marine Biology Refresher Course, which he successfully completed the following year.

He also trained as a scuba diver and took an interest in scouting and hiking.

== Career ==
Dr Chhapgar joined the Department of Fisheries, Bombay State in 1955 as a junior research assistant. He moved on to become a senior research assistant, biologist, superintendent of fisheries and later an assistant director of fisheries, taking up postings at a various locations, including Kolhapur, Satara and Sangli Districts. From 1959 to 1965 he served as curator of the Taraporewala Aquarium.

He participated in the International Indian Ocean Expedition (1959–64) aboard the USS Anton Bruun (from Madras to Vishakhapatnam) and INS Kistna (Cochin to Port Blair to Madras, 1961–1965) and on the maiden cruise of the Indian oceanographic vessel ORV Sagar Kanya (from Marmagao to Mombasa) in 1983 to study the monsoon in the Arabian Sea.

In 1973 he joined the Bhabha Atomic Research Centre to study aquatic radioactivity and its impact on the marine environment. He retired in 1987.

== Species described ==
Even as a research student, he described two new species of crabs and a new form of another. The crab species were described in the Records of the Indian Museum in 1956 (Pinnotheres vicajii, Pseudograpsus intermedius, Leptodius euglyptus quadrispinosus. The first two species of crabs were discovered in the sea off Bombay while the third was found in the Okha region of Gujarat.

In 1966, he described two mantis shrimps from Bombay in the genus Squilla (now Clorida).

After his retirement he described, along with S. R. Sane, a new species of fish Puntius setnai from Goa.

== Achievements and honours ==
Chhapgar specialized in the Decapoda particularly the marine species in the infraorder Brachyura. He was elected a Life Fellow of the International Oceanographic Foundation, for his "contributions to the advancement and extension of knowledge and discovery in oceanography and the marine sciences". A portrait of him is included in the Gallery of Carcinologists in the Smithsonian Institution's National Museum of Natural History in Washington, D.C. He is also a Founding Fellow of the Indian Fisheries Association.

From 1991 he guided MSc and PhD students and was a visiting faculty at the University of Mumbai. He served on the Board of Governors of Maharashtra Nature Parks Association for three years and was on the executive committee of the Bombay Natural History Society from 1988 to 2004. In 1994, he was awarded the Dharmakumarsinhji Trophy for his lifetime achievement in the field of ornamental fish keeping.

A variety of Sida acuta Burm., a plant discovered at Lakshadweep by Dr. M.R. Almeida was named after him as S. acuta var chhapgarii.

Sida albeida chhapgari:Javed Mohammed has named a new species of crab spider thomisus chhapgari after him.

== Publications ==
Dr Chhapgar published numerous papers in scientific journals. He is a contributing editor to The Aquarium and Freshwater and Marine Aquarium. He also wrote several books and articles for a popular audience, some under the pen name of beefsea. Some of his publications include:

- Marine Crabs of Bombay State. Published by the Taraporevala Marine Biological Station, Bombay (1957)
- How to keep fish at home (in English, Hindi and Marathi). Taraporevala Aquarium Bombay. (sold over 10,000 copies in English)(1982).
- Guide to keeping and breeding aquarium fish. Bombay Aquarium Society (1983).
- Common fishes of India. Oxford University Press, India. (1987). ISBN 0-19-568799-X
- Wonder world under water. National Book Trust, India. (1991). ISBN 978-81-237-1477-6
- Seashore life of India. Oxford University Press, India (1991). ISBN 978-0-19-568800-9
- Man Inside the sea. National Book Trust, India (1995). ISBN 81-237-1536-6
- Guide to Taraporevala Aquarium. Taraporevala Aquarium, Mumbai (1995).
- Salim Ali’s India, Bombay Natural History Society. (Edited jointly with Dr Ashok S. Kothari) (1996). ISBN 0-19-564160-4
- Treasures of Indian Wildlife. Bombay Natural History Society. (Jointly edited with Dr. Ashok S Kothari) (2005). ISBN 978-0-19-564227-8
- Marine life in India. Oxford University Press, India. (2005–06). ISBN 978-0-19-568514-5
- Living Jewels from the Indian Jungle. Bombay Natural History Society. (Edited jointly with Dr Ashok S Kothari) (2009). ISBN 978-0-19-806465-7
- Understanding the sea. Bombay Natural History Society. (2013).
- Wildlife of the Himalayas and the Terai Region, Bombay Natural History Society. (Edited jointly with Dr. Ashok S Kothari) (2012).
- In press – Wonders of a coral reef. National Book Trust, India.

In the aftermath of heavy rains in Mumbai in August 2005, nearly 2,000 unsold copies of his book "The Marine Life in India" at the Oxford University Press warehouse were destroyed by flooding.
