= Pethia setnai =

Conservation status
- Vulnerable (IUCN 3.1)

Scientific classification
- Kingdom: Animalia
- Phylum: Chordata
- Class: Actinopterygii
- Order: Cypriniformes
- Family: Cyprinidae
- Subfamily: Smiliogastrinae
- Genus: Pethia
- Species: P. setnai

Binomial name
- Pethia setnai (Chhapgar & Sane, 1992)

Synonyms
- Puntius setnai Chhapgar & Sane, 1992

Species of fish

Pethia setnai is a species of cyprinid fish native to streams of the Western Ghats, India, where it is most commonly found in flowing sections of hill streams and smaller rivers. It can reach a length of up to 5.7 centimetres (2.2 in) TL. The species is named after later Dr. Sam Bomansha Setna, who was the first Director of Fisheries of the erstwhile Bombay State. The species has been imported in recent years for the aquarium trade where it is sometimes referred to as the indigo barb or Narayan barb, the latter an unfortunate name that has caused confusion between this species and Pethia narayani.

Males tend to be more colorful than females, displaying bright red fins while the fins of females only carry a blush of this color. When in full color, males of P. setnai can easily be confused with males of Pethia reval, though the latter tend to be smaller and the red fin color more permanent and less mood-dependent. Also the gold areas on the flanks of P. setnai are more vivid.

P. setnai can be successfully maintained in water temperatures of 20–27 °C (68–81 °F), pH of 6.0–7.5 and hardness 90–268 ppm. It is an omnivore and most likely to be found eating worms, as well as insects, other small sized invertebrates, plant material and organic detritus.

This fish is thought to hold good potential as an aquarium fish, but currently has a restricted distribution and has been included in IUCN Red List as vulnerable. Mining operations, tourism activities, organic wastes and sewage are reported as major threats to this species.
