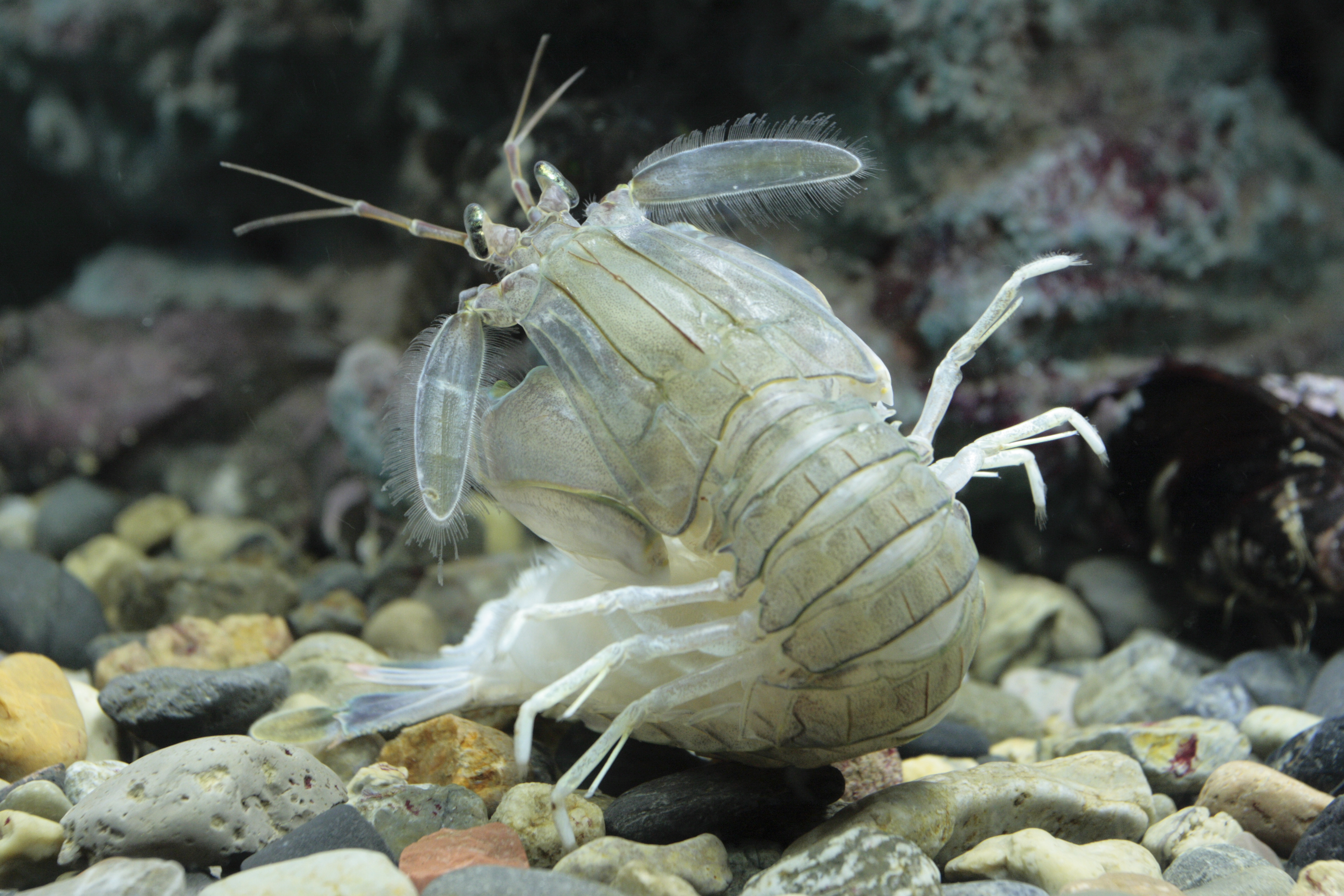
- Oratosquilla oratoria

Scientific classification
- Domain: Eukaryota
- Kingdom: Animalia
- Phylum: Arthropoda
- Class: Malacostraca
- Order: Stomatopoda
- Family: Squillidae
- Genus: Oratosquilla; Manning, 1968

= Oratosquilla =

Genus of crustaceans

Oratosquilla is a genus of crustaceans belonging to the family Squillidae. The species of this genus are found in Indo-West-Pacific. The genus was first described in 1968 by Raymond Brendan Manning.

== Species ==
The following species are recognized.

- Oratosquilla oratoria (De Haan, 1844)
- Oratosquilla fabricii (Holthuis, 1941)
- Oratosquilla kempi (Schmitt, 1931)
- Oratosquilla woodmansoni (Kemp, 1911)
- Oratosquilla jakartensis (Moosa, 1975)
- Oratosquilla birsteini (Makarov, 1971)
- Oratosquilla arabica (Ahmed, 1971)
- Oratosquilla asiatica (Manning, 1978)
- Oratosquilla fossulata (Moosa, 1986)
- Oratosquilla gravieri (Manning, 1978)
- Oratosquilla hindustanica (Manning, 1978)
- Oratosquilla megalops (Manning, 1980)
- Oratosquilla microps (Garcia & Manning, 1982)
- Oratosquilla ornata (Manning, 1971)
- Oratosquilla pentadactyla (Manning, 1978)
- Oratosquilla perpensa (Kemp, 1911)
- Oratosquilla septemdentata (Ahyong, 1994)
- Oratosquilla simulans (Holthuis, 1967)
- Oratosquilla solicitans (Manning, 1978)
- Oratosquilla stephensoni (Manning, 1978)
- Oratosquilla striata (Manning, 1978)
- Oratosquilla subtilis (Manning, 1978)
- Oratosquilla turbata (Manning, 1978)
- Oratosquilla tweediei (Manning, 1971)
- Oratosquilla vietnamica (Blumstein, 1971)
- Oratosquilla mauritiania (Kemp, 1913)
