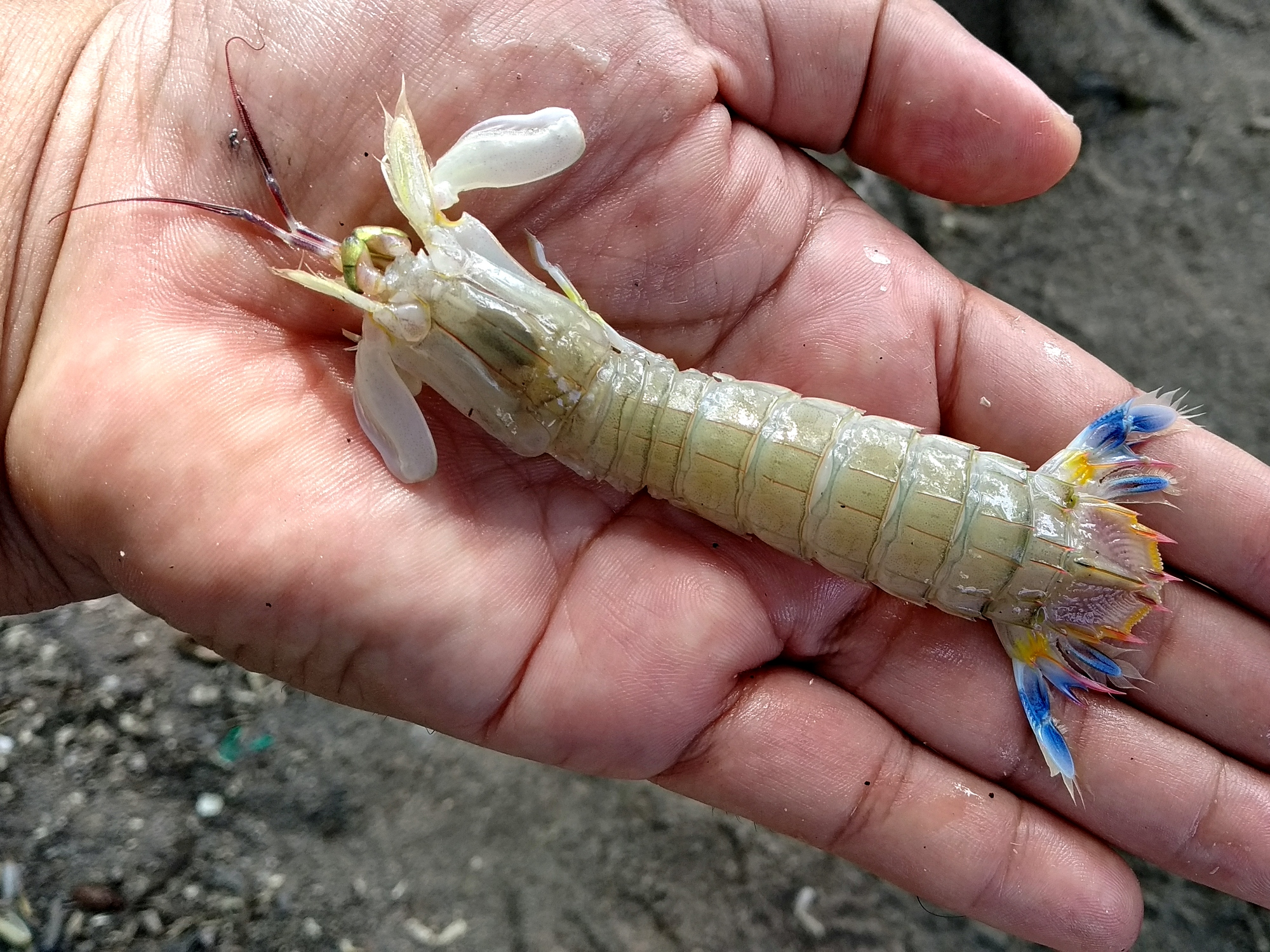
- Erugosquilla woodmasoni

Scientific classification
- Domain: Eukaryota
- Kingdom: Animalia
- Phylum: Arthropoda
- Class: Malacostraca
- Order: Stomatopoda
- Family: Squillidae
- Genus: Erugosquilla; Manning, 1995

= Erugosquilla =

Genus of crustaceans

Erugosquilla is a genus of crustaceans belonging to the family Squillidae. The genus was first described in 1995 by Raymond Brendan Manning. The type species is Erugosquilla massavensis (Kossmann, 1880).

== Species ==
Species accepted by WoRMS:

- Erugosquilla grahami Ahyong & Manning, 1998
- Erugosquilla hesperia (Manning, 1968)
- Erugosquilla massavensis (Kossmann, 1880)
- Erugosquilla septemdentata (Ahyong, 1994)
- Erugosquilla serenei Ahyong & Manning, 1998
- Erugosquilla woodmasoni (Kemp, 1911)
