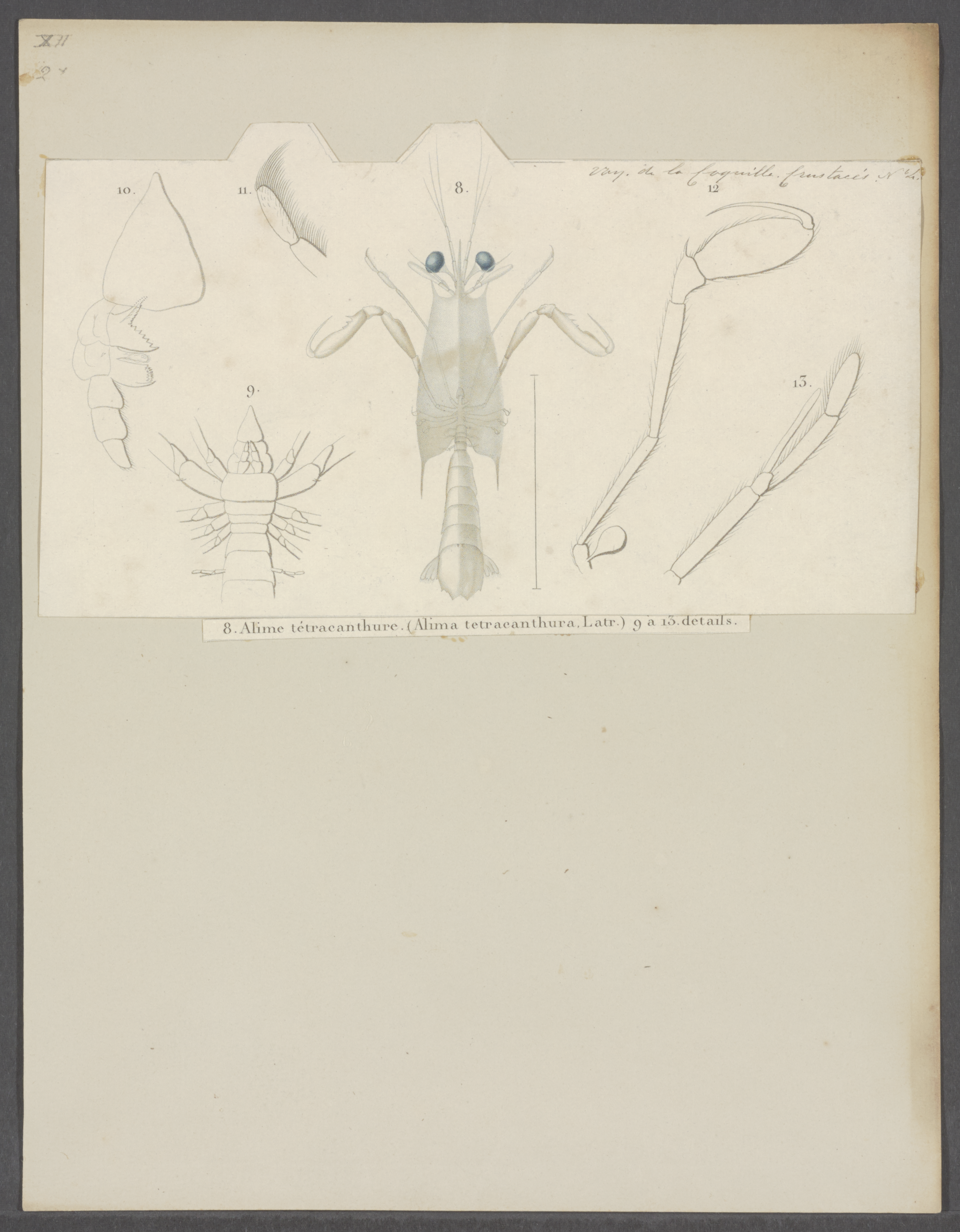

Scientific classification
- Domain: Eukaryota
- Kingdom: Animalia
- Phylum: Arthropoda
- Class: Malacostraca
- Order: Stomatopoda
- Family: Squillidae
- Genus: Alima; Leach, 1817

= Alima (crustacean) =

Genus of crustaceans

Alima is a genus of shrimps belonging to the family Squillidae, and was first described in 1817 by William Elford Leach.

Leach describes the genus as

"Thorax elongate with the sides not approximating. Mouth placed towards the hinder part of the thorax."

== Species ==
Species accepted by the World Register of Marine Species are:

- Alima hieroglyphica (Kemp, 1911)
- Alima hildebrandi (Schmitt, 1940)
- Alima maxima Ahyong, 2002
- Alima neptuni (Linnaeus, 1768)
- Alima orientalis Manning, 1978
- Alima pacifica Ahyong, 2001
