= Narayan barb =

Conservation status
- Least Concern (IUCN 3.1)

Scientific classification
- Kingdom: Animalia
- Phylum: Chordata
- Class: Actinopterygii
- Order: Cypriniformes
- Family: Cyprinidae
- Subfamily: Smiliogastrinae
- Genus: Pethia
- Species: P. narayani

Binomial name
- Pethia narayani (Hora, 1937)

Synonyms
- Barbus narayani Hora, 1937; Puntius narayani (Hora, 1937)

Species of fish

The Narayan barb (Pethia narayani), is a species of cyprinid fish endemic to India where it is found in clear hill streams in the Western Ghats. This species can reach a length of 7.8 centimetres (3.1 in) TL. It has consistently been confused with Pethia setnai, especially in the aquarium trade.
