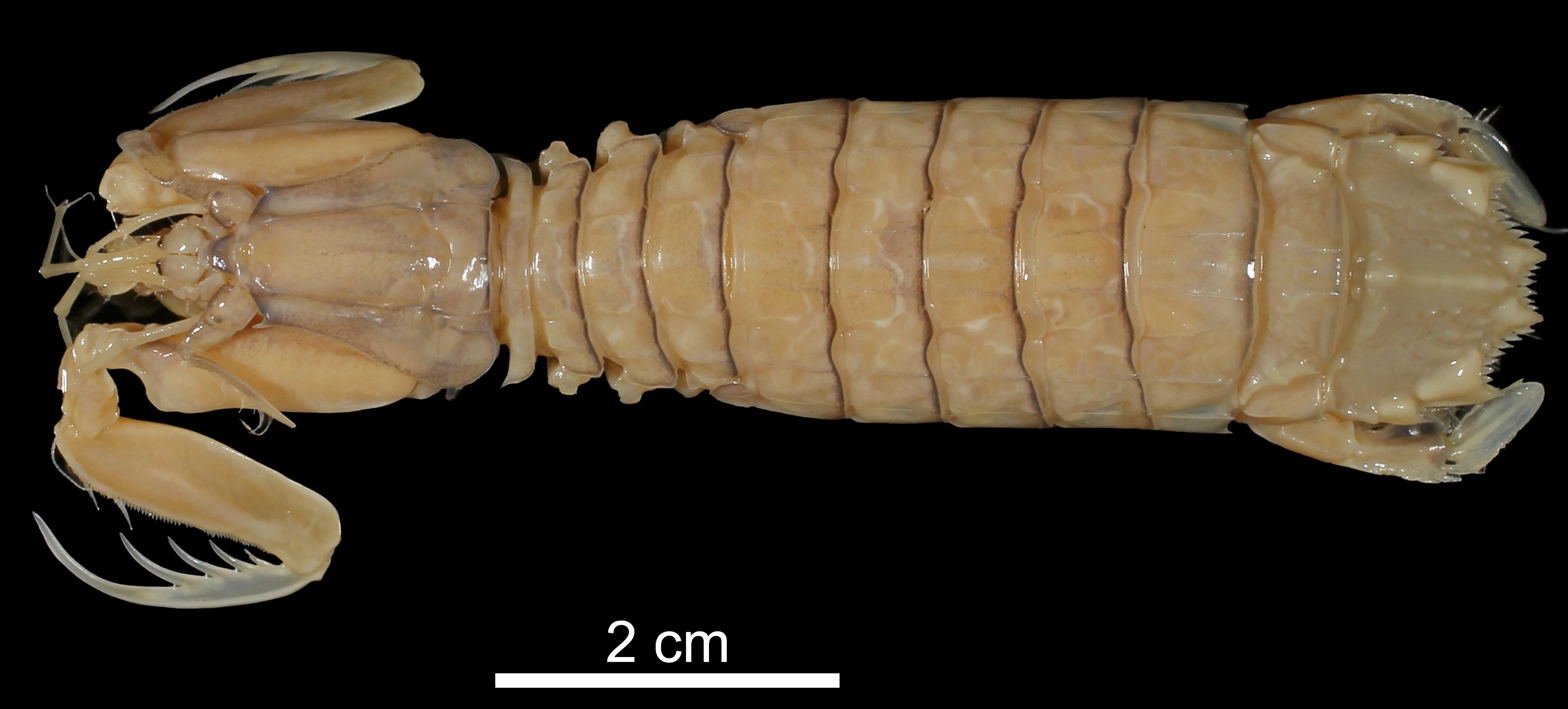
- Clorida gaillardi

Scientific classification
- Domain: Eukaryota
- Kingdom: Animalia
- Phylum: Arthropoda
- Class: Malacostraca
- Order: Stomatopoda
- Family: Squillidae
- Genus: Clorida; Eydoux & Souleyet, 1842

= Clorida =

Genus of crustaceans

Clorida is a genus of shrimps belonging to the family Squillidae.

The species of this genus are found in Northern America, Southeastern Asia, Southern Africa and Australia.

Species:

- Clorida albolitura Ahyong & Naiyanetr, 2000
- Clorida bombayensis (Chhapgar & Sane, 1967)
- Clorida daviei Ahyong, 2001
- Clorida decorata Wood-Mason, 1875
- Clorida denticauda (Chhapgar & Sane, 1967)
- Clorida depressa (Miers, 1880)
- Clorida gaillardi Moosa, 1986
- Clorida granti (Stephenson, 1953)
- Clorida japonica Manning, 1978
- Clorida javanica Moosa, 1974
- Clorida latreillei Eydoux & Souleyet, 1842
- Clorida obtusa Ahyong, 2001
- Clorida rotundicauda (Miers, 1880)
- Clorida seversi Moosa, 1973
- Clorida wassenbergi Ahyong, 2001
