= Miyakella =

Scientific classification
- Domain: Eukaryota
- Kingdom: Animalia
- Phylum: Arthropoda
- Class: Malacostraca
- Order: Stomatopoda
- Family: Squillidae
- Genus: Miyakella; Ahyong & Low, 2013

Synonyms
- Miyakea Manning, 1995

Genus of crustaceans

Miyakella is a genus of shrimps belonging to the family Squillidae. It is a replacement name for Miyakea Manning, 1995 which was pre-occupied.

Species:

- Miyakella holoschista (Kemp, 1911)
- Miyakella nepa (Latreille 1828)
