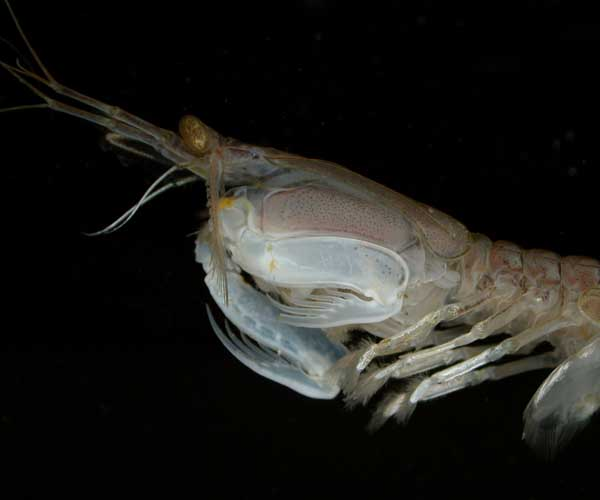
- Squilla mantis

Scientific classification
- Kingdom: Animalia
- Phylum: Arthropoda
- Clade: Pancrustacea
- Class: Malacostraca
- Order: Stomatopoda
- Suborder: Unipeltata
- Superfamily: Squilloidea; Latreille, 1802
- Family: Squillidae; Latreille, 1802

= Squillidae =

Family of crustaceans

Squillidae is a family of mantis shrimp, the only family in the superfamily Squilloidea. The type genus is Squilla. It is the stomatopod family with the most genera, as follows:

- Alima Leach, 1817
- Alimopsis Manning, 1977
- Alimopsoides Moosa, 1991
- Anchisquilla Manning, 1968
- Anchisquilloides Manning, 1977
- Anchisquillopsis Moosa, 1986
- Areosquilla Manning, 1976
- Belosquilla Ahyong, 2001
- Busquilla Manning, 1978
- Carinosquilla Manning, 1968
- Clorida Eydoux & Souleyet, 1842
- Cloridina Manning, 1995
- Cloridopsis Manning, 1968
- Crenatosquilla Manning, 1984
- Dictyosquilla Manning, 1968
- Distosquilla Manning, 1977
- Erugosquilla Manning, 1995
- Fallosquilla Manning, 1995
- Fennerosquilla Manning & Camp, 1983
- Gibbesia Manning & Heard, 1997
- Harpiosquilla Holthuis, 1964
- Humesosquilla Manning & Camp, 2001
- Kaisquilla Ahyong, 2002
- Kempella Low & Ahyong, 2010
- Lenisquilla Manning, 1977
- Leptosquilla Miers, 1880
- Levisquilla Manning, 1977
- Lophosquilla Manning, 1968
- Meiosquilla Manning, 1968
- Miyakella Ahyong & Low, 2013
- Natosquilla Manning, 1978
- Neclorida Manning, 1995
- Neoanchisquilla Manning, 1978
- Oratosquilla Manning, 1968
- Oratosquillina Manning, 1995
- Paralimopsis Mossa, 1991
- Parvisquilla Manning, 1973
- Pontiosquilla Manning, 1995
- Pterygosquilla Hilgendorf, 1890
- Quollastria Ahyong, 2001
- Rissoides Manning & Lewisohn, 1982
- Schmittius Manning, 1972
- Squilla Fabicius, 1787
- Squilloides Manning, 1968
- Tuleariosquilla Manning, 1978
- Visaya Ahyong, 2004
