= List of Mycodrosophila species =

This is a list of 127 species in Mycodrosophila, a genus of vinegar flies in the family Drosophilidae.

== Mycodrosophila species ==
- Mycodrosophila aciliata Okada, 1986^{c g}
- Mycodrosophila adyala Burla, 1954^{c g}
- Mycodrosophila albicornis (Meijere, 1916)^{c g}
- Mycodrosophila alienata Duda, 1926^{c g}
- Mycodrosophila amabilis (Meijere, 1911)^{c g}
- Mycodrosophila ampularia Chen, Shao & Fan, 1989^{c g}
- Mycodrosophila angularis Okada, 1986^{c g}
- Mycodrosophila annulata Bock, 1980^{c g}
- Mycodrosophila annulipes Okada, 1986^{c g}
- Mycodrosophila aqua Bock, 1980^{c g}
- Mycodrosophila argentifrons Malloch, 1927^{c g}
- Mycodrosophila atie Burla, 1954^{c g}
- Mycodrosophila atrithorax Okada, 1968^{c g}
- Mycodrosophila barracloughi Chassagnard & Tsacas, 1998^{c g}
- Mycodrosophila basalis Okada, 1956^{c g}
- Mycodrosophila biceps Kang, Lee & Bahng, 1966^{c g}
- Mycodrosophila bicolor Okada, 1986^{c g}
- Mycodrosophila bifibulata Takada, 1968^{c g}
- Mycodrosophila biroi Duda, 1923^{c g}
- Mycodrosophila boudinoti Tsacas & Chassagnard, 1991^{c g}
- Mycodrosophila brunnescens Wheeler & Takada, 1963^{c g}
- Mycodrosophila buxtoni Malloch, 1934^{c g}
- Mycodrosophila caesia McEvey, 2005^{c g}
- Mycodrosophila calceus Okada, 1986^{c g}
- Mycodrosophila carinata Bock, 1980^{c g}
- Mycodrosophila carola Wheeler & Takada, 1964^{c g}
- Mycodrosophila celesta Sidorenko, 1992^{c g}
- Mycodrosophila chazeaui Tsacas & Chassagnard, 1991^{c g}
- Mycodrosophila ciliatipes Duda, 1923^{c g}
- Mycodrosophila ciliophora Okada, 1986^{c g}
- Mycodrosophila claudensis Bock, 1980^{c g}
- Mycodrosophila claytonae Wheeler & Takada, 1963^{i c g b}
- Mycodrosophila compacta Bock, 1980^{c g}
- Mycodrosophila coralloides Chen, Shao & Fan, 1989^{c g}
- Mycodrosophila cornea Okada, 1986^{c g}
- Mycodrosophila costata Okada, 1986^{c g}
- Mycodrosophila delta McEvey, 2005^{c g}
- Mycodrosophila dianae Bock, 1980^{c g}
- Mycodrosophila dimidiata (Loew, 1862)^{i c g b}
- Mycodrosophila ditan Burla, 1954^{c g}
- Mycodrosophila diversa Bock, 1980^{c g}
- Mycodrosophila dudleyi Chassagnard & Tsacas, 1997^{c g}
- Mycodrosophila echinacea Chen, Shao & Fan, 1989^{c g}
- Mycodrosophila elegans Wheeler & Takada, 1963^{c g}
- Mycodrosophila erecta Okada, 1968^{c g}
- Mycodrosophila esakii Wheeler & Takada, 1964^{c g}
- Mycodrosophila fascinata McEvey, 2005^{c g}
- Mycodrosophila flavilumbus Okada, 1986^{c g}
- Mycodrosophila fracticosta (Lamb, 1914)^{c g}
- Mycodrosophila fumusala Lin & Ting, 1971^{c g}
- Mycodrosophila gaku Burla, 1954^{c g}
- Mycodrosophila gordoni McEvey & Bock, 1982^{c g}
- Mycodrosophila gracilis Okada, 1986^{c g}
- Mycodrosophila grandifrons McEvey & Bock, 1982^{c g}
- Mycodrosophila gratiosa (Meijere, 1911)^{c g}
- Mycodrosophila gressitti Wheeler & Takada, 1964^{c g}
- Mycodrosophila halterata Malloch, 1930^{c g}
- Mycodrosophila helenae Bock, 1980^{c g}
- Mycodrosophila heterothrix McEvey & Bock, 1982^{c g}
- Mycodrosophila huangshanensis Chen & Toda, 1994^{c g}
- Mycodrosophila japonica Okada, 1956^{c g}
- Mycodrosophila joalahae Bock, 1982^{c g}
- Mycodrosophila kabakolo Burla, 1954^{c g}
- Mycodrosophila kitagawai Wynn & Toda, 1990^{c g}
- Mycodrosophila koreana Lee & Takada, 1959^{c g}
- Mycodrosophila kuntii Kumar & Gupta, 1992^{c g}
- Mycodrosophila legrandi Tsacas & Chassagnard, 1991^{c g}
- Mycodrosophila longicornis Seguy, 1933^{c g}
- Mycodrosophila malayana Okada, 1986^{c g}
- Mycodrosophila margoae Bock, 1980^{c g}
- Mycodrosophila marksae Bock, 1980^{c g}
- Mycodrosophila matilei Chassagnard & Lachaise, 2000^{c g}
- Mycodrosophila melaniae McEvey, 2005^{c g}
- Mycodrosophila melanophaea Tsacas, 1990^{c g}
- Mycodrosophila melanopleura Sundaran & Gupta, 1991^{c g}
- Mycodrosophila minor Bock, 1980^{c g}
- Mycodrosophila missima Okada, 1986^{c g}
- Mycodrosophila mulgravensis Bock, 1980^{c g}
- Mycodrosophila multidentata Okada, 1986^{c g}
- Mycodrosophila neoprojectans Wheeler & Takada, 1963^{c g}
- Mycodrosophila nigerrima (Lamb, 1914)^{c g}
- Mycodrosophila nigrans Chassagnard & Tsacas, 1997^{c g}
- Mycodrosophila nigrithorax Malloch, 1934^{c g}
- Mycodrosophila nigrobrunnea (Lamb, 1914)^{c g}
- Mycodrosophila nigropleura Wheeler & Takada, 1963^{c g}
- Mycodrosophila nigropleurata Takada & Momma, 1975^{c g}
- Mycodrosophila nigropteropleura Kang, Lee & Bahng, 1965^{c g}
- Mycodrosophila ocellata McEvey, 2005^{c g}
- Mycodrosophila ohbai Wynn & Toda, 1990^{c g}
- Mycodrosophila palmata Okada, 1956^{c g}
- Mycodrosophila palpalis McEvey, 2005^{c g}
- Mycodrosophila papuana Okada, 1986^{c g}
- Mycodrosophila parallelinervis Duda, 1926^{c g}
- Mycodrosophila penihispidus Sundaran & Gupta, 1991^{c g}
- Mycodrosophila planata McEvey, 2005^{c g}
- Mycodrosophila planipalpis Kang, Lee & Bahng, 1966^{c g}
- Mycodrosophila poecilogastra (Loew, 1874)^{c g}
- Mycodrosophila ponapeae Wheeler & Takada, 1964^{c g}
- Mycodrosophila projectans (Sturtevant, 1916)^{c g}
- Mycodrosophila pseudoprojectans Wheeler & Takada, 1963^{c g}
- Mycodrosophila punctata Tsacas, 1990^{c g}
- Mycodrosophila quadrata Okada, 1986^{c g}
- Mycodrosophila rayi Bock, 1980^{c g}
- Mycodrosophila recula Wheeler & Kambysellis, 1966^{c g}
- Mycodrosophila rika Sidorenko, 1999^{c g}
- Mycodrosophila rosemaryae Bock, 1980^{c g}
- Mycodrosophila scotos Bock, 1980^{c g}
- Mycodrosophila separata (Meijere, 1911)^{c g}
- Mycodrosophila serrata Okada, 1986^{c g}
- Mycodrosophila setipalpis Okada, 1956^{c g}
- Mycodrosophila shikokuana Okada, 1956^{c g}
- Mycodrosophila simplex Bock, 1980^{c g}
- Mycodrosophila spinata Okada, 1986^{c g}
- Mycodrosophila stalkeri Wheeler and Takada, 1963^{i c g}
- Mycodrosophila stigma Bock, 1980^{c g}
- Mycodrosophila stylaria Chen & Okada, 1989^{c g}
- Mycodrosophila subciliatipes Okada, 1986^{c g}
- Mycodrosophila subgratiosa Okada, 1965^{c g}
- Mycodrosophila suluma Burla, 1954^{c g}
- Mycodrosophila sunguru Burla, 1954^{c g}
- Mycodrosophila takachihonis Okada, 1956^{c g}
- Mycodrosophila tillieri Tsacas & Chassagnard, 1991^{c g}
- Mycodrosophila umbra McEvey, 2005^{c g}
- Mycodrosophila vannuatuae McEvey, 2005^{c g}
- Mycodrosophila variata Bock, 1980^{c g}
- Mycodrosophila wassermani Wheeler & Takada, 1964^{c g}
- Mycodrosophila xanthopleura Sundaran & Gupta, 1991^{c g}

Data sources: i = ITIS, c = Catalogue of Life, g = GBIF, b = Bugguide.net
