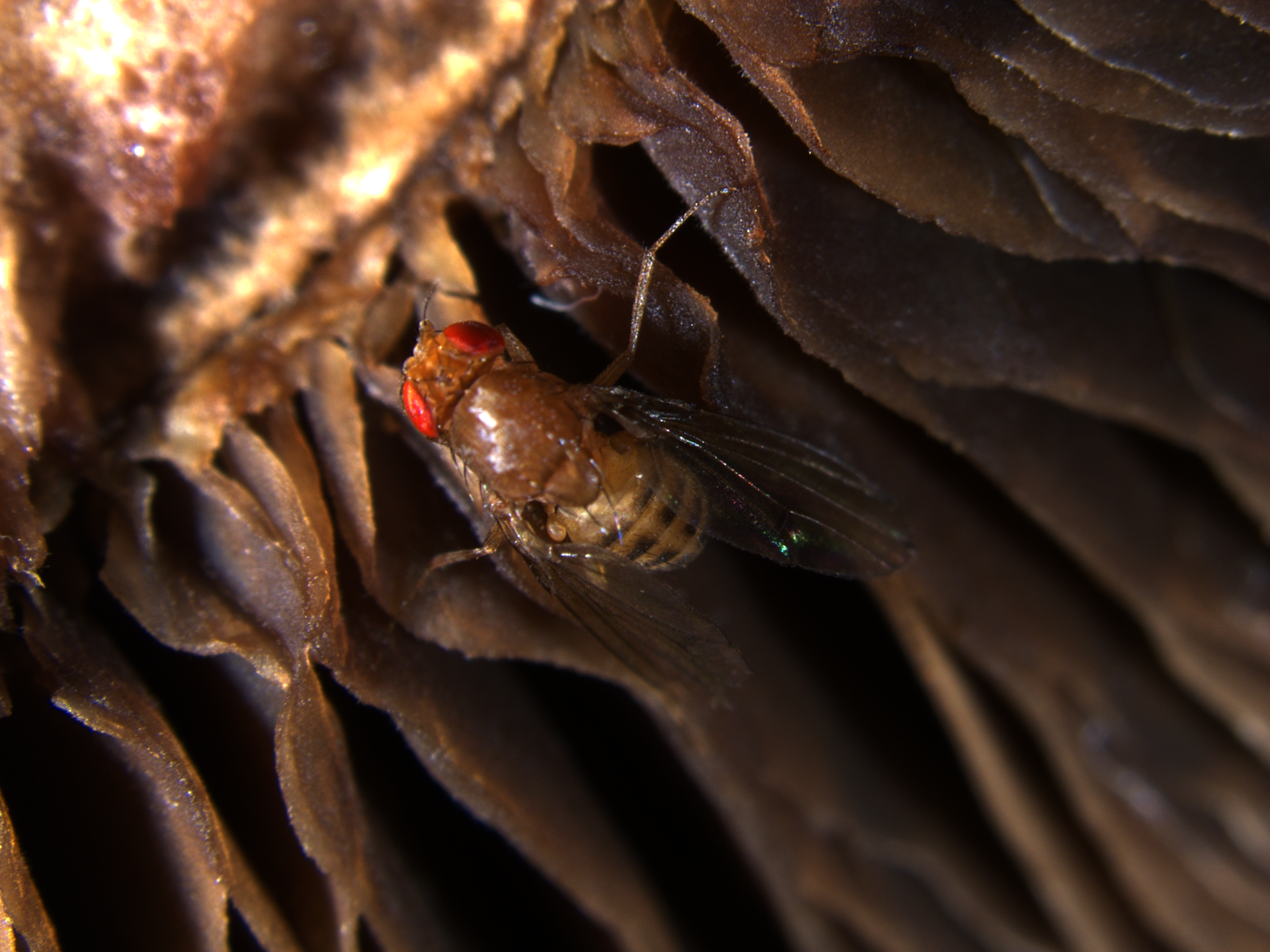
- A Drosophila immigrans fly showing the breaks in the abdominal banding pattern of subgenus Drosophila flies

Scientific classification
- Kingdom: Animalia
- Phylum: Arthropoda
- Clade: Pancrustacea
- Class: Insecta
- Order: Diptera
- Family: Drosophilidae
- Subfamily: Drosophilinae
- Genus: Drosophila
- Subgenus: Drosophila; Sturtevant, 1939

Type species
- Musca funebris Fabricius, 1787

Species groups
- virilis-repleta radiation: angor; annulimana; bromeliae; canalinea; carbonaria; carsoni; coffeata; dreyfusi; flavopilosa; melanica; mesophragmatica; nannoptera; peruviana; quadrisetata; repleta; robusta; virilis; immigrans-tripunctata radiation: bizonata; calloptera; cardini; funebris; guarani; histrio; macroptera; pallidipennis; pinicola; quinaria; rubrifrons; sticta; testacea; tripunctata; immigrans; Hawaiian Drosophila: antopocerus; ateledrosophila; haleakalae; "modified mouthparts"; "modified tarsus"; nudidrosophila; "picture wing"; rustica; unplaced species groups: antioquia; aureate; nigrosparsa; onychophora; picta; polychaeta; simulivora; tumiditarsus; xanthopallescens

= Drosophila (subgenus) =

Subgenus of flies

Drosophila is a paraphyletic subgenus of the genus Drosophila, a classification of fruit flies. This subgenus was first described by Alfred Sturtevant in 1939. Members of the subgenus Drosophila can be distinguished from other drosophilid species by breaks in the pigmentation along the dorsal section of their abdomen.

== Phylogeny ==
- - immigrans-tripunctata radiation
  - - - D. quadrilineata species group
      - Samoaia
    - - Zaprionus
      - - D. tumiditarsus species group
        - Liodrosophila
- - Dichaetophora
  - Hirtodrosophila
  - - Mycodrosophila
    - Paramycodrosophila
- - - virilis-repleta radiation (in part)
    - - subgenus Siphlodora
      - virilis-repleta radiation (in part)
  - - Hawaiian Drosophila
    - Scaptomyza
  - D. polychaeta species group

Cladogram of the subgenus Drosophila

Most species are within three major groups, the virilis-repleta radiation, the immigrans-tripunctata radiation and the Hawaiian Drosophila. Additionally, several smaller species groups are recognized consisting of smaller numbers of species, like the tumiditarsus species group and the polychaeta species group.

== Gallery ==
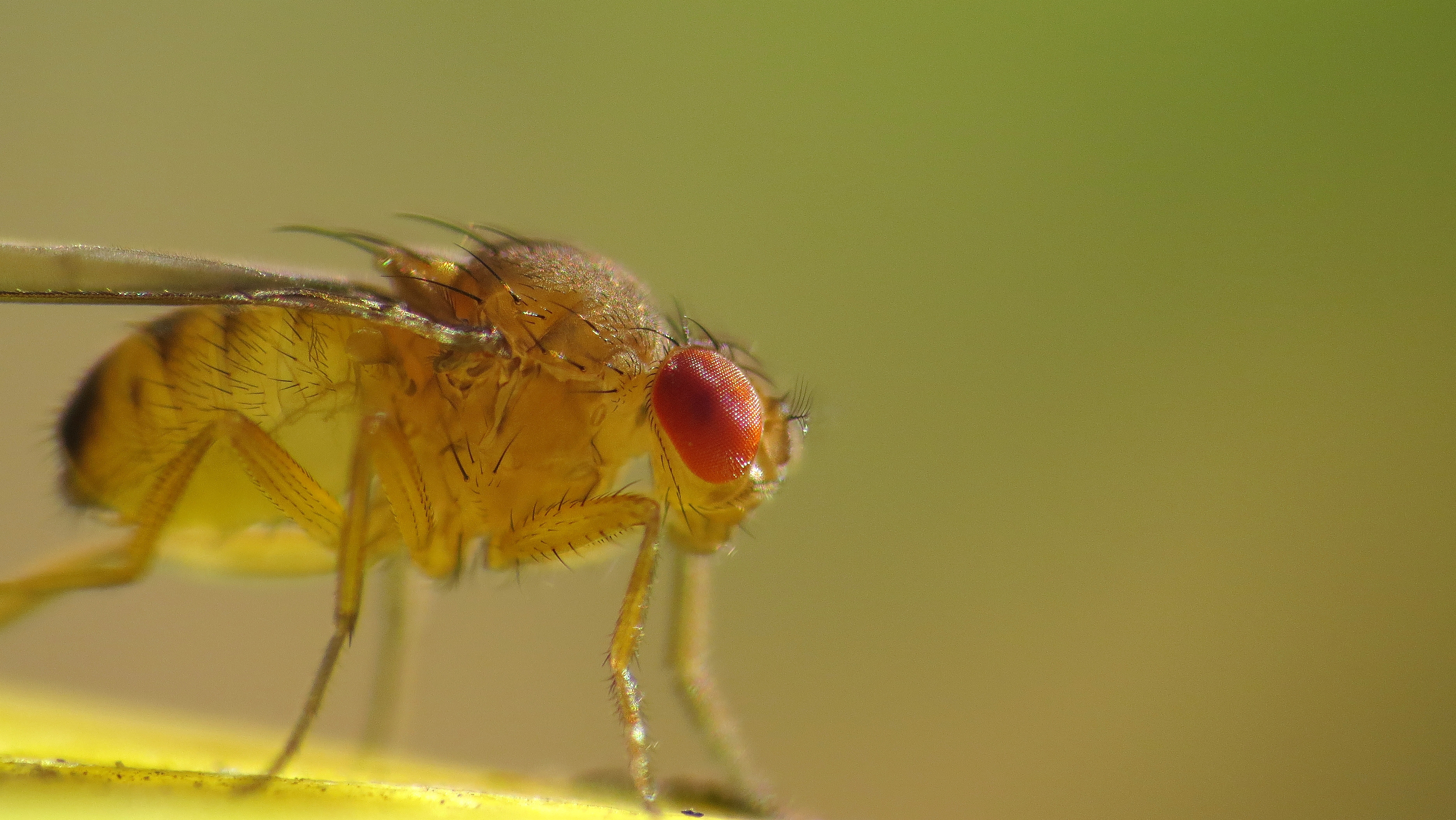
D. immigrans (immigrans species group)

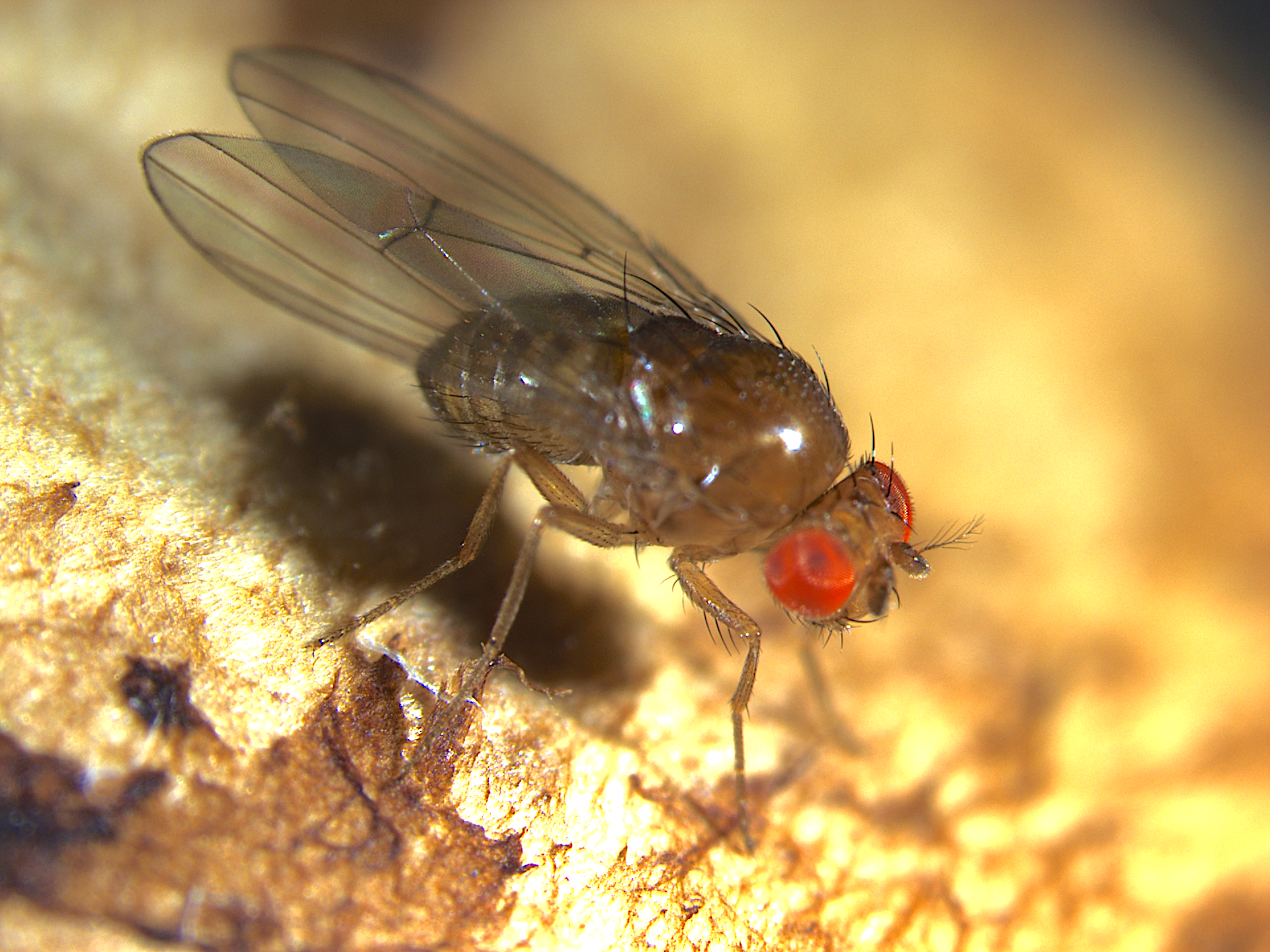
D. innubila (quinaria species group)

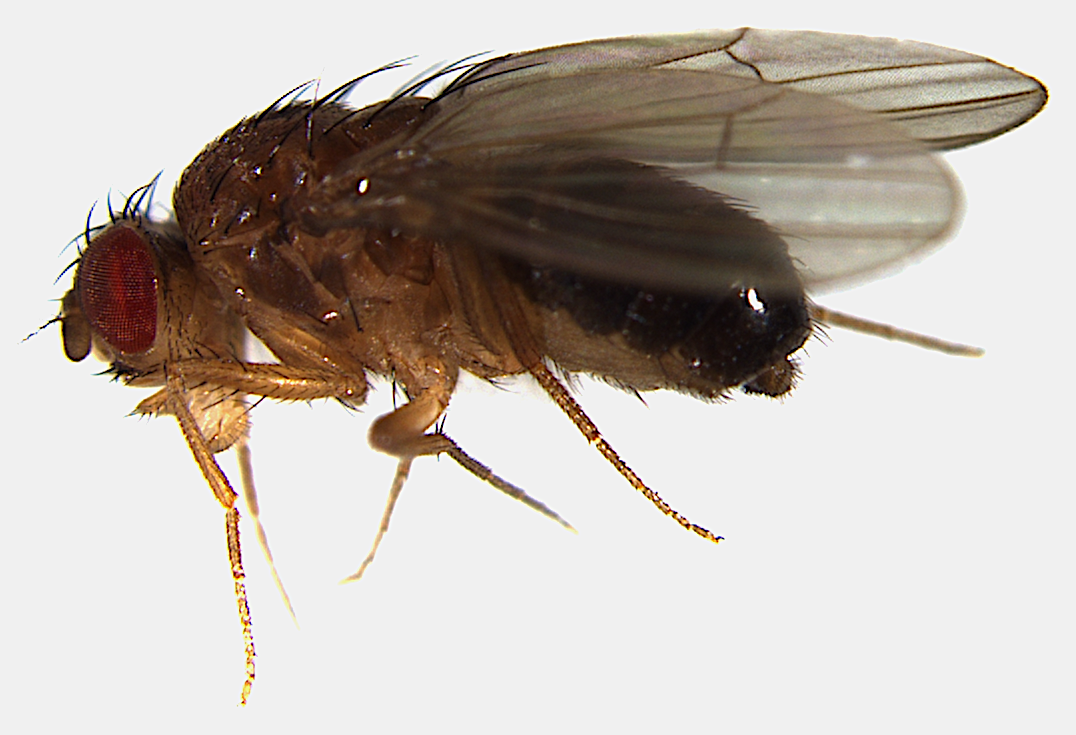
D. funebris (funebris species group)

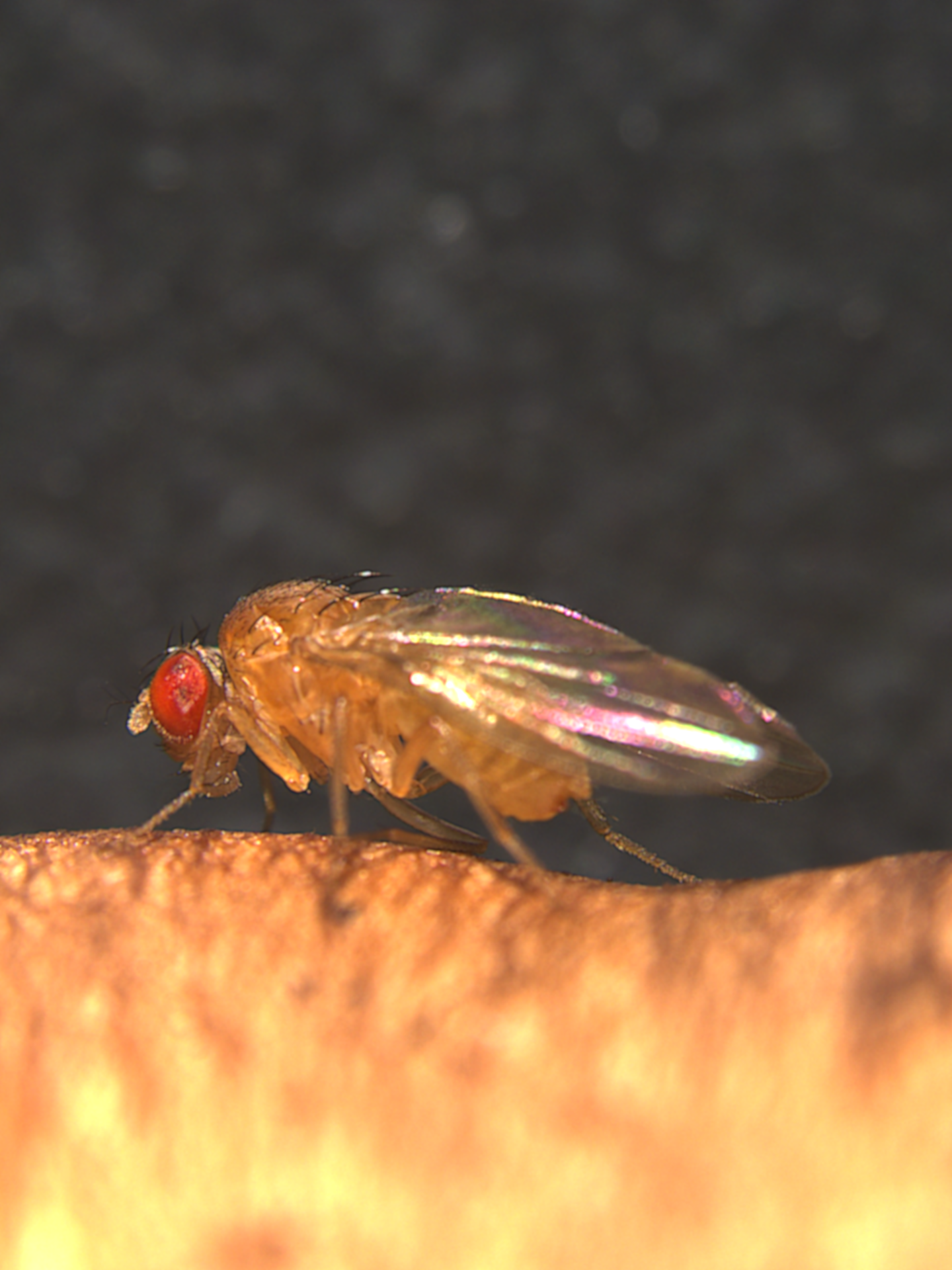
D. neotestacea (testacea species group)

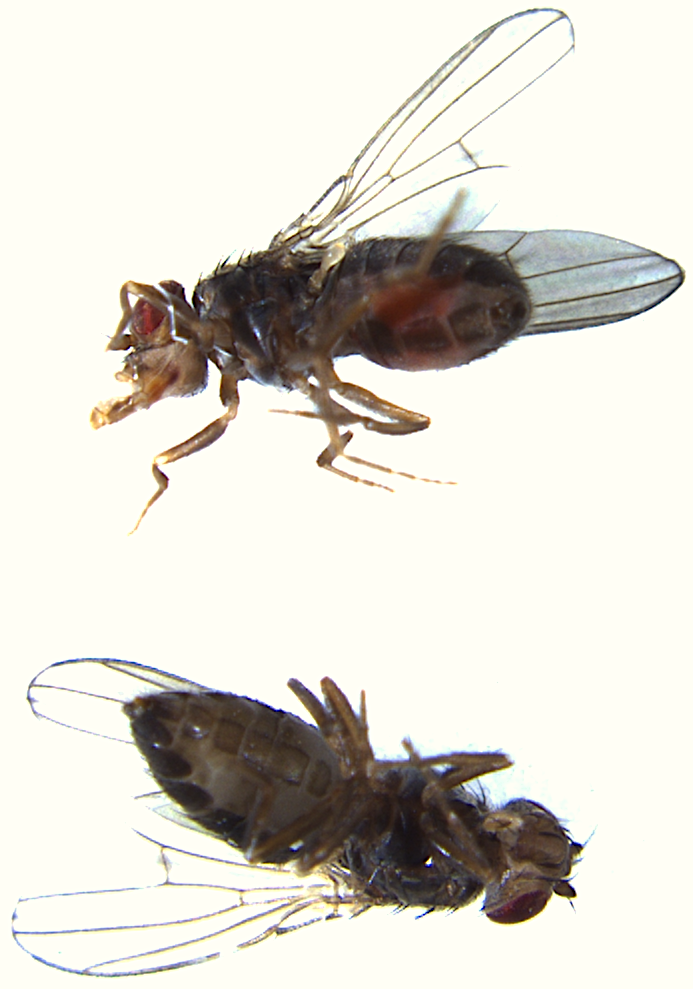
D. virilis (virilis species group)

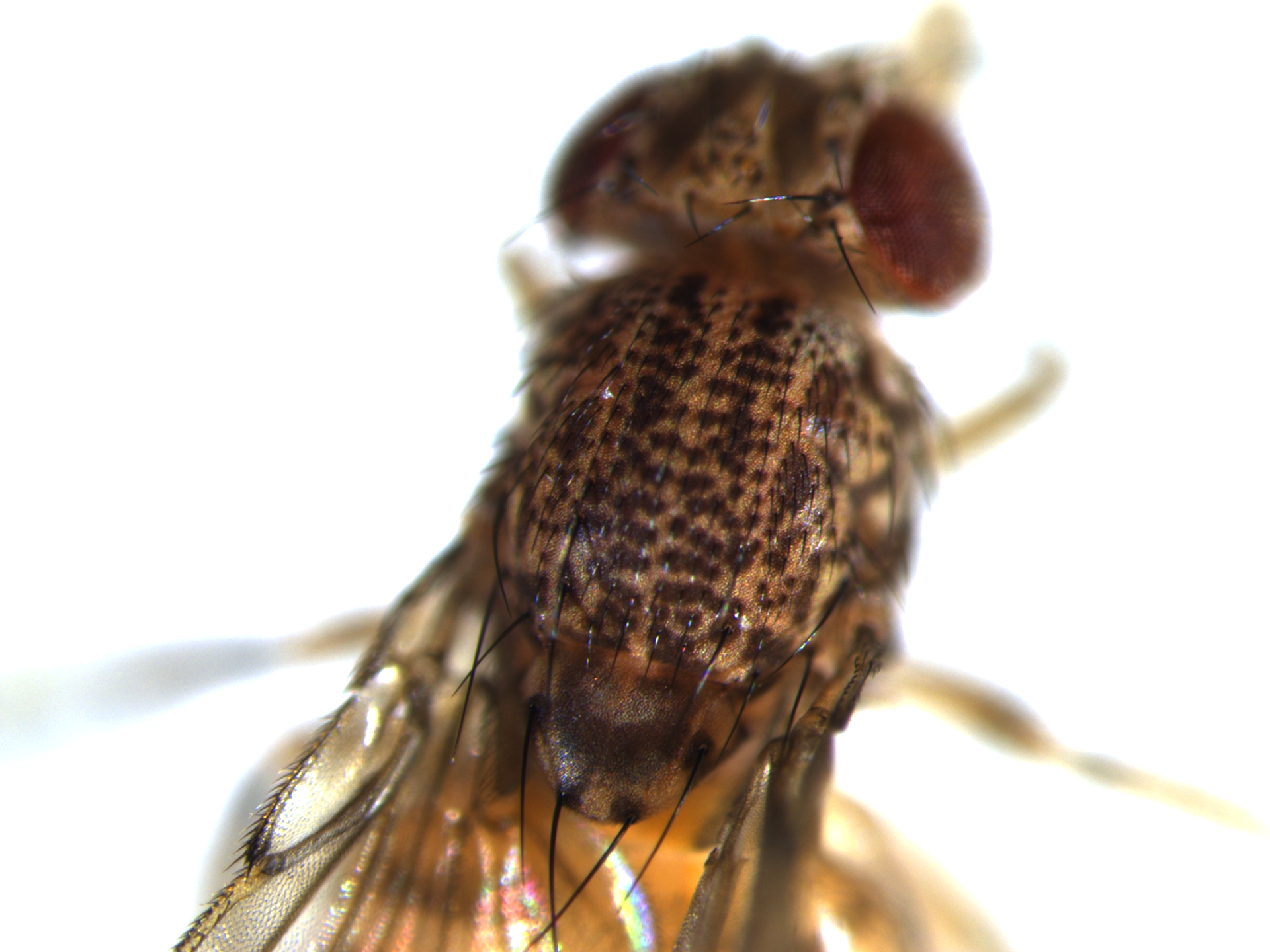
D. mercatorum (repleta species group)

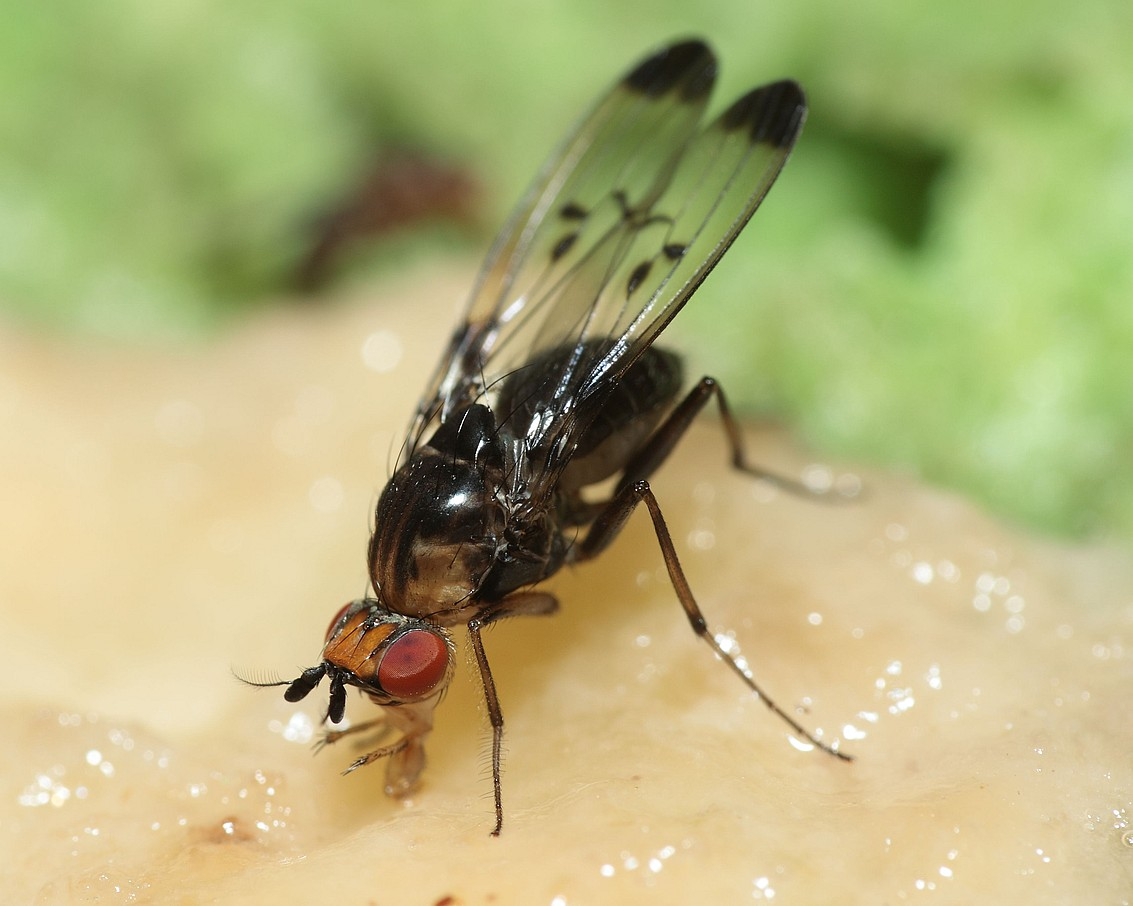
D. silvestris (Hawaiian picture-wing Drosophila)

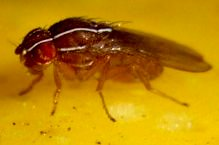
Zaprionus indianus (Zaprionus genus)
