= Drosophila colorata =

Scientific classification
- Kingdom: Animalia
- Phylum: Arthropoda
- Class: Insecta
- Order: Diptera
- Family: Drosophilidae
- Subfamily: Drosophilinae
- Genus: Drosophila
- Subgenus: Drosophila
- Species group: melanica
- Species: D. colorata

Binomial name
- Drosophila colorata Walker, 1849

Synonyms
- Drosophila sulcata Sturtevant, 1916

Species of fly

Drosophila colorata is a species of vinegar fly in the family Drosophilidae. It is found in the United States.
