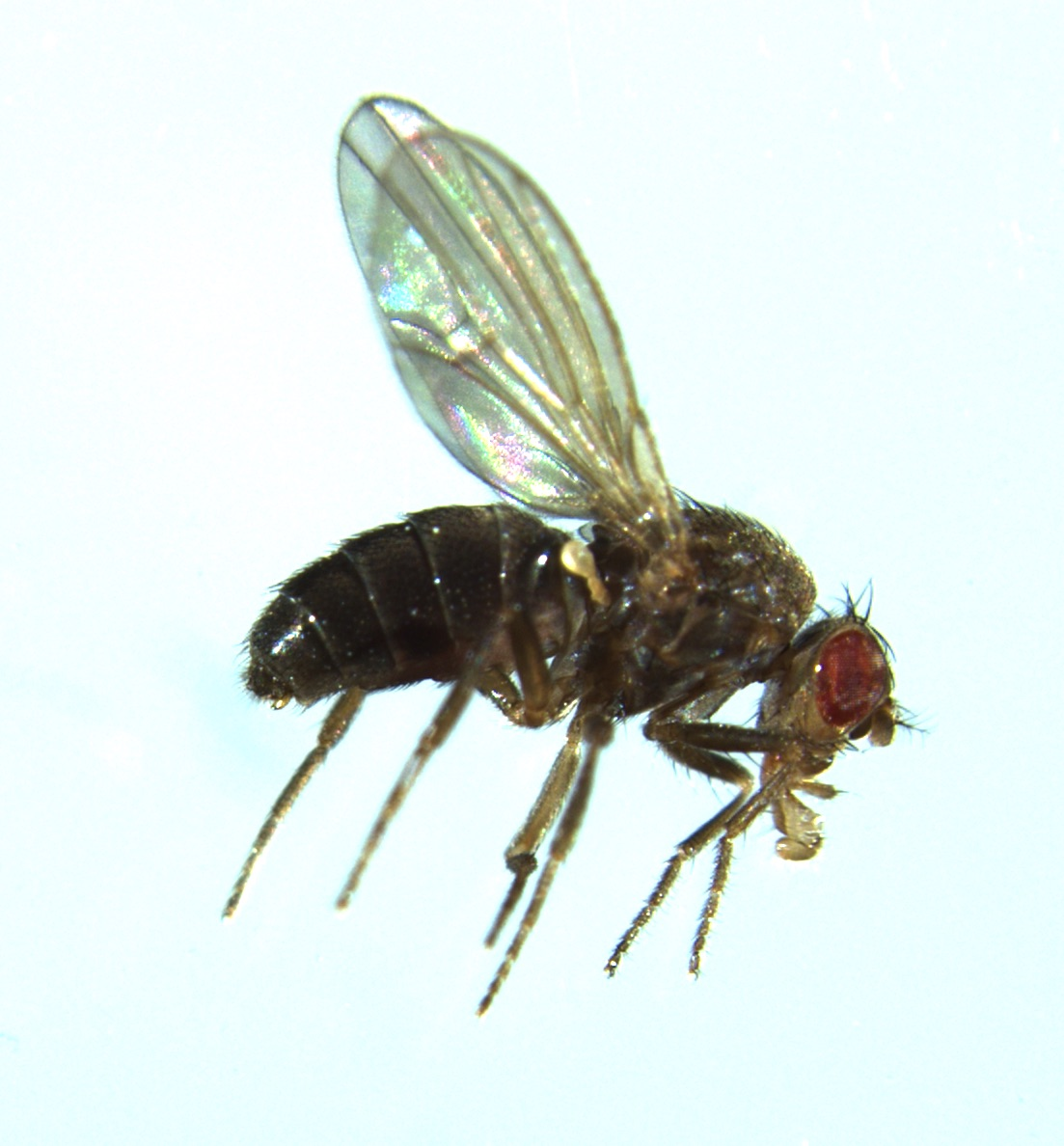
- A D. virilis male
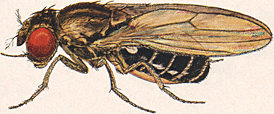
- Illustration of a D. virilis male

Scientific classification
- Domain: Eukaryota
- Kingdom: Animalia
- Phylum: Arthropoda
- Class: Insecta
- Order: Diptera
- Family: Drosophilidae
- Subfamily: Drosophilinae
- Genus: Drosophila
- Subgenus: Drosophila
- Species group: virilis
- Species: D. virilis

Binomial name
- Drosophila virilis Sturtevant, 1916

= Drosophila virilis =

Species of fly

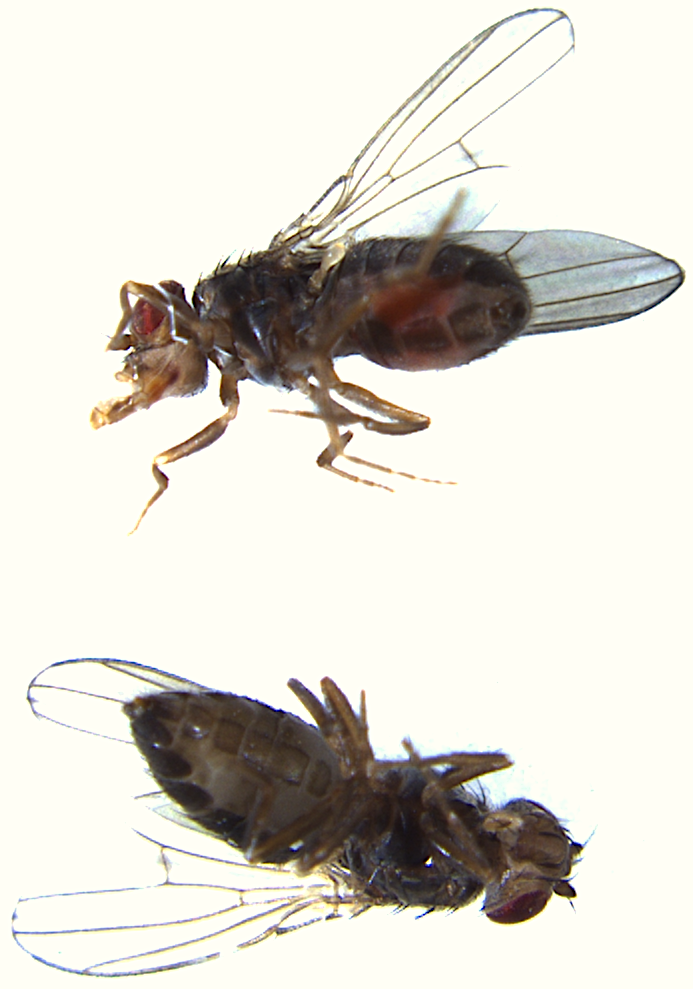
A D. virilis male (top) and female (bottom), showing the bright red gonads of the male

Drosophila virilis is a species of fruit fly with a worldwide distribution (probably due to human movements), and was one of 12 fruit fly genomes sequenced for a large comparative study. The males have bright red gonads that can be seen through the cuticle.

The life cycle of D. virilis is longer than that of D. melanogaster, in part owing to its larger body size; adult D. virilis are approximately twice the size of D. melanogaster.

== Phylogeny ==
D. virilis belongs to the virilis group, which diverged around 7 to 11 million years ago, during the period of the Early Miocene. This event split the virilis group into the montana and virilis phylads, which include the species Drosophila montana and Drosophila virilis, respectively. Divergence of these phylads preceded the group's movement from South Asia into North America.
