= C11H22O2 =

The molecular formula C_{11}H_{22}O_{2} (molar mass: 186.29 g/mol, exact mass: 186.1620 u) may refer to:

- Heptyl butyrate
- Pentyl hexanoate
- Undecylic acid, or undecanoic acid
