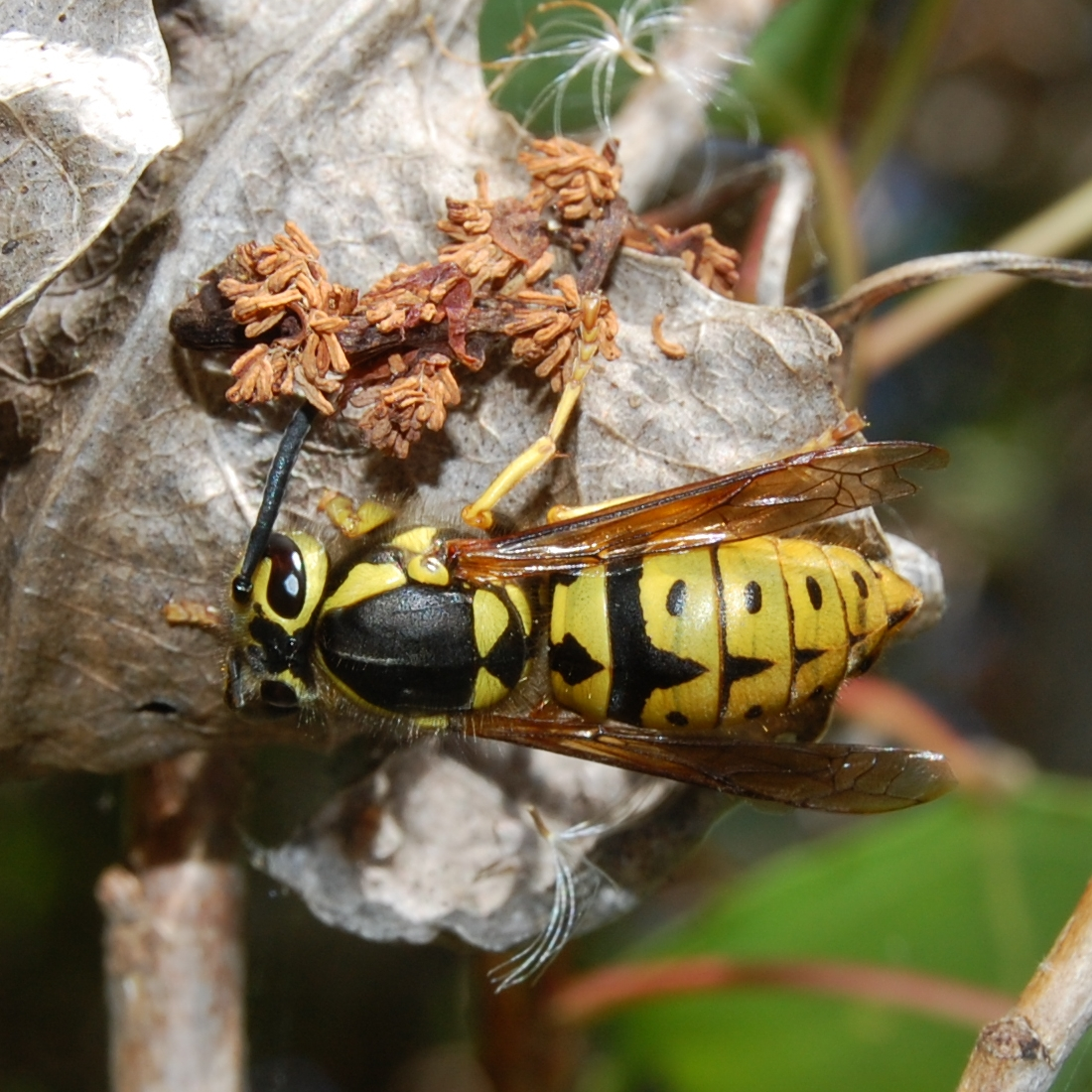
- Vespula pensylvanica queen

Scientific classification
- Kingdom: Animalia
- Phylum: Arthropoda
- Clade: Pancrustacea
- Class: Insecta
- Order: Hymenoptera
- Family: Vespidae
- Genus: Vespula
- Species: V. pensylvanica

Binomial name
- Vespula pensylvanica Saussure, 1857

= Vespula pensylvanica =

Western yellowjacket

Species of wasp

Vespula pensylvanica, the western yellowjacket (western yellow jacket), is a Nearctic species of wasp in the genus Vespula. It is native to regions of North America, largely in areas with northern temperate climates. Its reproductive behavior is constrained by cold weather, which successfully reduces the number of western yellowjackets in cold months. However, in the absence of cold weather, this wasp's population can explode. The western yellowjacket has become particularly invasive in the Hawaiian Islands, resulting in their label as a major pest.

== Taxonomy and phylogeny ==
V. pensylvanica was originally named by de Saussure in 1857; it falls into the subgenus Paravespula, within Vespula. Paravespula consists of 11 species, which have been divided into four groups on the basis of morphological differences. V. pensylvanica falls into the same group as V. germanica. With the exception of Allovespula, the subgenera recognized within Vespula are natural groups. The separation of Rugovespula and Paravespula appears to be monophyletic; however, this is not well established.

== Description and identification ==
The western yellowjacket shares the basic yellow and black pattern with other species of social wasps in the genus Vespula. As a result, it is often misidentified. Specifically, it closely resembles V. germanica. Though both species have a similar diamond-shaped black mark on the first tergum, V. pensylvanica can usually be differentiated by the continuous yellow ring (often referred to as an eye-loop) present around each eye. The eye-loop is not always present, however. Though few females lack this distinguishing characteristic, males often do not have the eye-loop. In such cases, V. pensylvanica can be identified by a spotted mark on the frons below the antenna, a slender aedeagus, and a denser apical region of tergum 7. The fore wing length ranges from 8.5–10.5 mm for workers, 12.5–14.5 mm for females, and 12.5–14.0 mm for males.

Western yellowjackets build large nests made of wood fibers, enclosed in a hexagonal paper envelope with a small 10– to 30-cm entrance tunnel at the bottom. Nests are usually found 10–15 cm below ground or in other dark cavities, such as rodent burrows or old logs.

== Distribution and habitat ==
The western yellowjacket is native across the western half of North America, in temperate zone climates. Its range overlaps with that of V. atropilosa. Individuals have been identified in the Canadian and Transition Zones in western North America. It has been found in all states west of the Rocky Mountains, from Mexico through western Canada. It is also found in Hawaii on the islands of Kauai, Oahu, Maui, and Hawaii. V. pensylvanica can be found in open forest, prairies, urban zones, gardens, parkland, meadows, and houses.

== Colony cycle ==
Colonies are initiated by the queen. After emerging from the diapause when winter ends, the fertilized queen searches for a nest site. When it is located, a small nest is formed. The queen continues to forage for construction materials and food until four to seven workers have emerged. At this point, the queen focuses solely on laying eggs and the nest continues to expand. Between August and September, males and queens are produced, which then leave the nest and mate. The nest begins to decline around this time. The males eventually die, and the inseminated queen begins diapause. The inseminated queen is the only member of the colony to survive winter. Longevity of the workers varies with colony activity and development, with the lifespan of the earliest-born workers averaging 22 days and the latest-born workers averaging 40 days.

Typically, colonies are monogynous and annual. In these colonies, attempts of other queens to enter result in fierce fighting between the intruder and the residing queen and/or workers. Perennial colonies, though, have been reported, containing numerous queens. Most perennial colonies have larger nests and more individuals.

== Behavior ==
=== Dominance hierarchy ===
As the size of a colony increases to the point where at least 30 workers are foraging at the same time, competition develops between workers. Often, one worker will attack the prey of another worker, resulting in neither worker bringing back prey. Older workers are more successful in attacking. They may also maul to exhibit dominance over nest mates; mauling entails one individual chewing another individual that remains motionless throughout. Generally, this occurs between two workers, with the aggressive worker beginning the mauling process when a returning forager enters or is near the entrance of the nest. At any given time, certain individuals repeatedly express mauling tendencies and recipients remain constant. Over time, the recipients become the maulers as they approach old age. As the colonies decline, mauling becomes less frequent.

=== Division of labor ===
Division of labor within the nests of V. pensylvanica is not sharply defined and is seemingly age-dependent. Within four days of emergence, workers begin foraging for fiber, nectar, water, and prey; larval feeding; construction of envelope and cells; nest sanitation; guarding and colony defense; thermal regulation; and “mauling” or aggressive behavior. Workers that emerge from the nest after the first 20–30 workers since its development express more variable behavior. Queens exhibit the same range of behavior with the exception of mauling; however, after four to seven workers emerge in mid-June, workers take over foraging. The queen does not leave the nest again after this point. The queen is responsible for ovipositing. Behavior becomes less variable as the colony begins to decline, when growth of the nest ceases. Larvae are not fed during colony decline, and most workers forage only for honey during this time.

=== Foraging ===
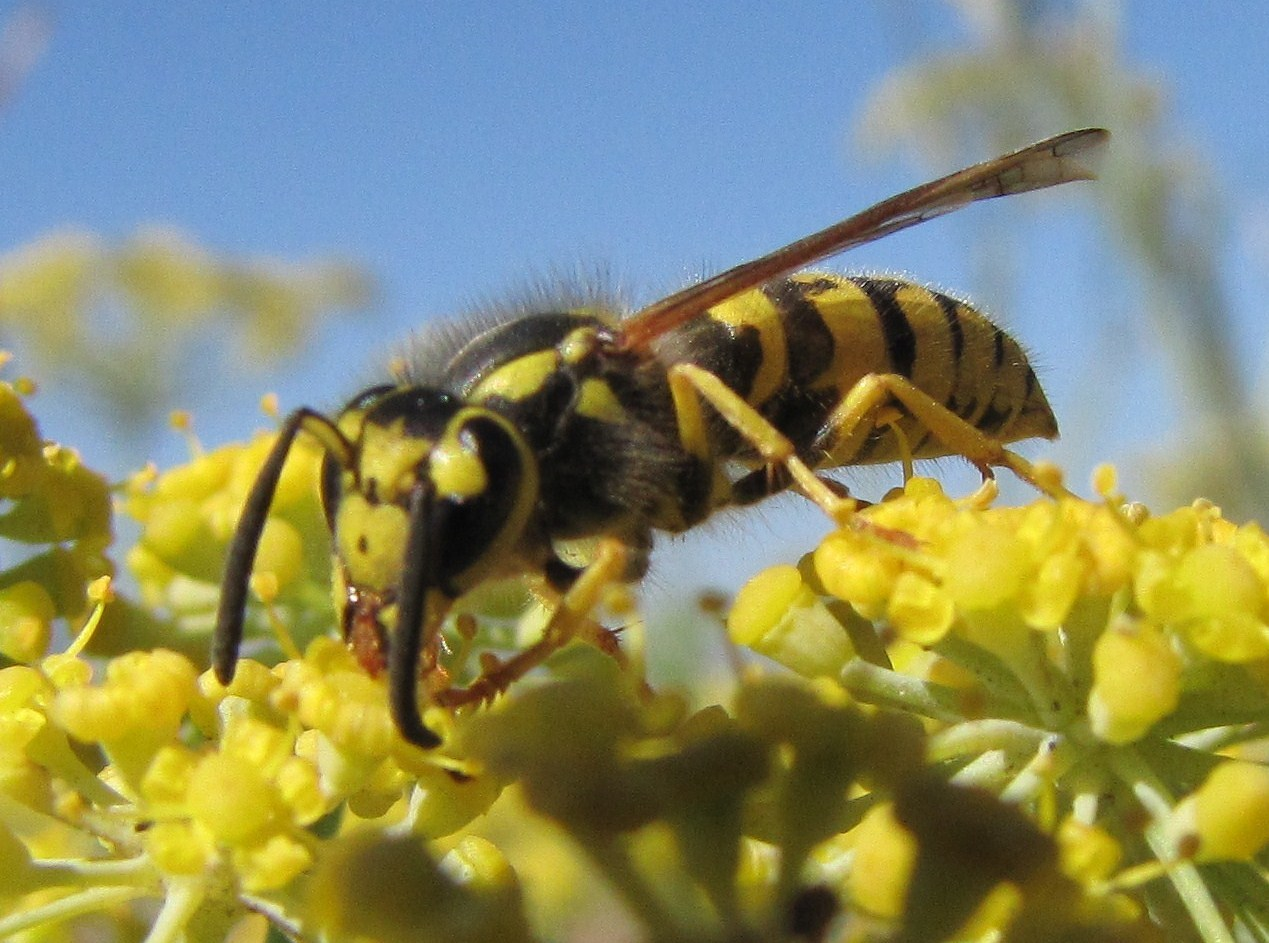
Western yellowjacket (V. pensylvanica) on a fennel flower (Foeniculum vulgare), near Robber's Peak, Orange, California

The western yellowjacket foraging behavior is similar to other Vespula species. Yellowjackets forage for insects and dead animals for meat and plant nectar for carbohydrates. The captured prey is typically taken to a more vertical surface and malaxated by chewing off legs and wings. In larger insects, the head is typically removed first. Foraging for prey requires visual cues, but odors can be used when scavenging for protein. Hunting for prey and dead animals occurs individually because yellowjacket workers are unable to communicate the location of food to other workers in the colony. All workers forage for honey, water, and fiber. In Hawaii, yellowjackets rob honey bee colonies through two major types of raids. Sometimes, yellowjackets enter and leave in a slow but steady traffic faced by opposition from honey bee workers. In the more common raid, yellowjackets enter individually and experience no apparent opposition. V. pensylvanica utilize their mandibles to scrape weathered wood and dried herbaceous stems to obtain resources rich in fiber. Most yellowjackets forage relatively close to the nest. The foraging distance ranges between 540 and 1800 feet. The average foraging distance is within 1,100 feet of the nest. In addition to visual and olfactory cues, learning also plays a role in foraging. They rarely return to a constant location for protein and shift foraging patterns when necessary.

=== Mating behavior ===
Mating behavior of V. pensylvanica has been observed to be very similar to mating behavior of V. germanica. Pairing occurs midday and receptive queens remain stationary throughout. Mating occurs between one male and one female, with the female generally upright on her legs and the male attached solely by genitalia. Other males in the nest do not interfere with the mating, but often antennate the pairs during the mating process. Sometimes, queens may be unreceptive and will exhibit this by twisting away from the males and biting. Unreceptive behavior from females, however, does not always prevent mating from occurring. Vespula queens often mate more than once with the same or different males. Mating involves only one male.

=== Brood/parental care ===
In early development, the queen lays eggs and takes care of larvae. Before the emergence of workers, the queen is responsible for feeding the brood. To feed developing larvae, the queen captures prey by incapacitation, trims it to an appropriate size for carrying, and brings it back to the nest to further malaxate the item. Males do not contribute to parental care. In fact, many males solicit liquids from developing larvae. Workers forage for food, capture and malaxate prey, defend territories, and monitor the distribution of resources among larvae. The larvae twitch back and forth in their nests to attract the attention of the workers and queens. When approached by adults, larvae reach back to expose their heads. If this reaction takes too long, workers give the food to another larva.

Nest sanitation also serves an important role in parental care. The western yellowjacket keeps its nest relatively clean compared to other social wasps. Most waste is removed, including paper waste, remains of prey, and dead larvae. In addition, a pre-defecation head dance occurs in both workers and the queen, and this fecal material is then removed. Workers also have been found to remove healthy larvae from their cells. Two or more workers together pull otherwise healthy larva from the cell and frequently cut it up and feed it to other larvae. This tendency increases during colony decline.

=== Thermoregulation ===
When the temperature of the nest becomes too hot (over 29 °C), the queen attempts to fan the nest to bring the temperature back down. In addition, workers have been observed to modulate body temperature. As protein content of food sources increase, thoracic temperature increases. Workers collecting high-quality protein had thoracic temperatures 1.98 °C higher than workers collecting low-quality protein. A possible explanation is that they modulate thoracic temperatures to increase foraging efficiency.

== Genetic relatedness and sex ratio conflict ==
Because relatedness differs in haplodiploid species, the effects of kin selection are predicted to differ from that of a diploid species. V. pensylvanica is a haplodiploid species. Thus, female offspring have a 0.75 relatedness to their sisters, but only a 0.25 relatedness to their brothers. As a result, kin selection posits that workers will be more inclined to show altruistic behavior toward sisters than brothers. Further, this implies that a conflict over sex ratio may result, with workers preferring their mothers to have daughters. Because the mother is related equally to sons and daughters, kin selection predicts the mother will not show a preference toward either sex.

== Reproductive plasticity ==
Though colonies of V. pensylvanica are generally monogynous and annual, polygyny and overwintering has been observed in non-native regions, specifically in Hawaii. The relaxation of the climate and climate-related constraints are believed to have contributed to the emergence of polygyny, and polygyny is a prerequisite for successful overwintering. Generally, climate is a constraining factor in the reproductive behavior of V. pensylvanica. When temperatures drop, food availability decreases and colony decline occurs. In Hawaii, however, this does not occur.

Two genetic mechanisms have been proposed to explain polygyny in Hawaiian colonies. Hamilton's kin selection theory provides an explanation for the divergence between polygyny and monogyny. Generally, monogyny should prevail unless polygynous benefits outweigh the costs of shared reproduction. If females are unrelated, the costs would usually outweigh the benefits, and monogyny would result. Using kin selection theory, two possible explanations exist as to why polygyny arises. First, daughter queens remaining in the natal nest possibly create kin associations that provide a mechanism allowing the benefits of polygyny to outweigh the costs. Another genetic mechanism explaining why polygyny arises is due to the bottleneck effect. Because a small number of founders gave rise to the population of V. pensylvanica in Hawaii, the entire population in Hawaii thus has an average degree of relatedness higher than presumed among the North American population. In both cases, genetic relatedness and kin selection could explain why polygyny has emerged in non-native regions.

== Kin recognition ==
Intraspecific competition has been observed to occur between two queens in different nests. Sometimes, nest takeovers can even occur, in which one queen assumes the role of queen in a nest that is not hers. This may mean that kin recognition is not occurring in these circumstances. Though this is not common, it nevertheless may mean that workers do not always recognize the new queen as unrelated.

== Interaction with other species ==
=== Diet ===
The diet of the V. pensylvanica is very broad. Food is obtained through both predation and scavenging. Adult workers are opportunistic predators and often return to areas of abundant prey to forage. The main foods obtained are high-protein foods such as small insects, caterpillars, and spiders. In addition, V. pensylvanica occasionally scavenges on dead animals, including dead honeybees. In Hawaii, the diet spans a total of 14 taxonomic orders, including both invertebrates and vertebrates. The most common taxa are small and inconspicuous, such as barklice or planthoppers. V. pensylvanica also preys on D. silvestris and other Drosophila flies native to Hawaii, disrupting the local ecosystem.

=== Obtaining prey ===
The ability to kill prey relies on three major characteristics of the targeted insects: their presence within foraging range, their acceptability, and the ease by which they can be captured. The types of arthropods in the diet depend on the habitat. In Hawaii, V. pensylvanica causes the direct reduction of Hylaeus species due to predation. Three species in particular are found in the diet, including H. difficilis, H. laetus, and H. nivicola. The Hylaeus species are typically killed under cool conditions while warming up in the sun. Yellowjackets have the advantage due to their sociality and thermoregulatory abilities. During cool temperatures, Hylaeus species spend time in the sun making them vulnerable to attack by yellowjackets. Lepidoptera and Araneae make up a consistent part of the yellowjacket diet in Hawaii. These arthropods were easy to locate and subdue. In a study on yellowjacket predation at Hawaii volcanoes and Haleakala National Parks in 1992, many of the Lepidoptera were taken as larvae. Unlike Hylaeus, Nesodynerus species have been able to avoid yellowjacket predation by active defense. In certain parts of Hawaii, Nesodynerus species directly compete with yellowjackets for caterpillars.

=== Nest associates ===
The subterranean nests provide suitable living conditions for many arthropods. The most common nest associates are Triphleba lugubris, a Phorid fly. The highest abundance of T. lugubris is found during late September to mid-October. The females of T. lugubris are typically the first arthropods to locate and exploit V. pensylvanica colonies under conditions favorable for nest associates. Large numbers of T. lugubris larvae reside near the bottom of nest between the leaves of nest envelopes. T. lugubris is the only nest associate that contributes to colony decline, by destroying pupae in the nests. While the larvae feed on dead yellowjacket brood and adults collected beneath the combs, they also feed on V. pensylvanica pupae. Similarly, yellowjacket pupae have also been found to feed on the larvae and pupae of T. lugubris living in the food source.

The other less common nest associates include Cryptophagus pilosus, Fannia spp., and Dendrophaonia querceti. These nest associates infest nests later in the season compared to T. lugubris. The infestation of C. pilosus typically occurs after colony decline and nest decomposition has begun. The late infestation of C. pilosus suggests that these nest associates primarily function as commensals, feeding on fungi in the nests. Fannia species are found less frequently in V. pensylvanica nests. These larvae and eggs are often more conspicuous at the bottom of nests due to debris covering. Larvae of D. querceti are scavengers on yellowjacket feces, dead brood, and dead adults concentrated at the bottom of the nests. However, in a few colonies, D. querceti invades late in the season and may attack weakened yellowjacket brood.

More recently, Sphecophaga vesparum burra has been added as another nest associate. The parasite was found for the first time in a V. pensylvanica nest in southeastern Washington in 1977. The nest contained one adult, one empty cocoon, and four intact cocoons. V. pensylvanica immediately attacks and kills newly introduced Sphecophaga individuals.

== Human importance ==
=== Stings ===
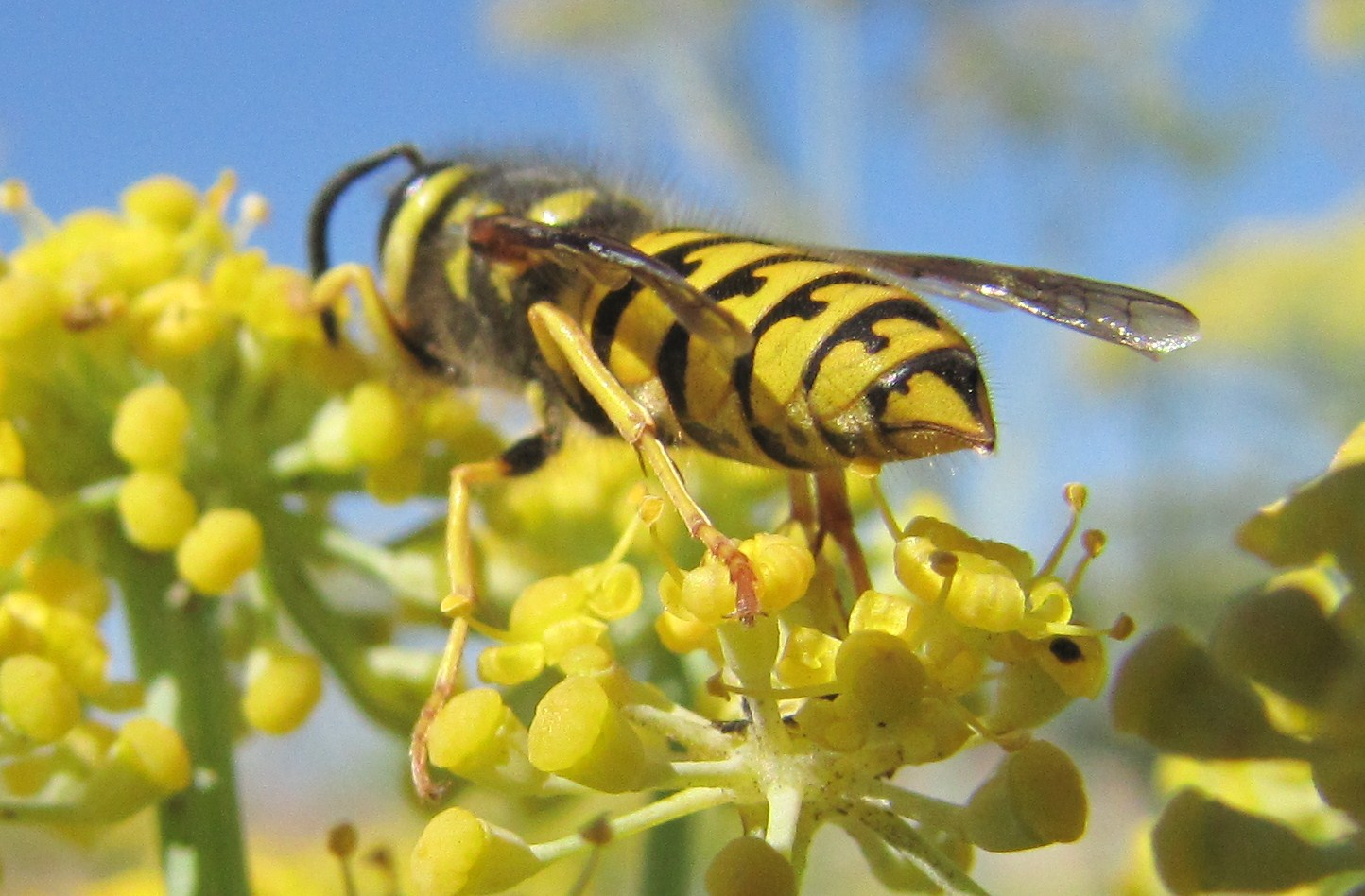
Western yellowjacket (Vespula pensylvanica) on a fennel flower (Foeniculum vulgare). Location: near Robber's Peak, Orange, CA, USA

The western yellowjacket is often a pest to humans. As outdoor human activity has increased, so, too, has the presence of V. pensylvanica. Concentrated garbage has become an alternative food supply, and colonies have emerged in and around areas of human impact, such as recreational parks and resorts. Though they tend not to sting unless a violent struggle occurs, they nonetheless violently protect their nests and can sting repeatedly. As a result, increased efforts into pest control have occurred. Because the chance of colony disturbance and resulting stings is great, the species is recommended to be controlled during outbreaks. The recommended treatment of stings is antihistamine ointments and tablets to reduce reactions. Those who are highly sensitive or allergic to stings should speak to a physician about alternatives such as emergency kits with premeasured doses of epinephrine or desensitization procedures.

=== Agriculture ===
Periodic population outbreaks every three to five years have created problems within fruit orchards. The tendency of V. pensylvanica to cluster in areas of human impact has created problems for pickers in fruit orchards who are frequently stung. The costs to the grower to control the outbreaks can be extremely high. V. pensylvanica is often immune to efforts to control other pests, which often results in high costs to growers who have to use additional methods to control V. pensylvanica.

=== Pest control ===
In the West, western yellowjackets are the primary pests ranging from Washington to California. The period of outbreaks previously described can be financially burdensome for people engaging in logging, raising fruit, or in recreation-associated activities. Two major strategies used for monitoring and controlling V. pensylvanica include trapping with synthetic chemical attractants and tree shaking. Experiments on chemical attractants of V. pensylvanica and other generalist wasps show the effectiveness of using acetic acid in combination with these chemicals separately: isobutanol, heptyl butyrate, and butyl butyrate. Acetic acid alone did not have the same attractive effects as the chemical combinations. Using a vial dispenser, releasing up to an estimated 2.3 mg of heptyl butyrate per hour increased the number of yellowjackets attracted. In Hawaii, the Christmas tree is a large seasonal import each year. Over 90% of these trees contain live insects. Although V. pensylvanica typically resides in ground nests, queens occasionally choose these trees as overwintering sites. One potential strategy to reduce the number of yellowjackets and other generalist predators is applying preharvest permethrin sprays in combination with mechanical tree-shaking.
