= Drosophila angor species group =

Scientific classification
- Kingdom: Animalia
- Phylum: Arthropoda
- Class: Insecta
- Order: Diptera
- Family: Drosophilidae
- Genus: Drosophila
- Subgenus: Drosophila
- Species group: angor

Species
- Drosophila angor Lin and Ting, 1971; Drosophila hei Watabe and Peng, 1991; Drosophila velox Watabe and Peng, 1991

Species group of fruit flies

The Drosophila angor species group is a species group of fruit flies in the subgenus Drosophila.
