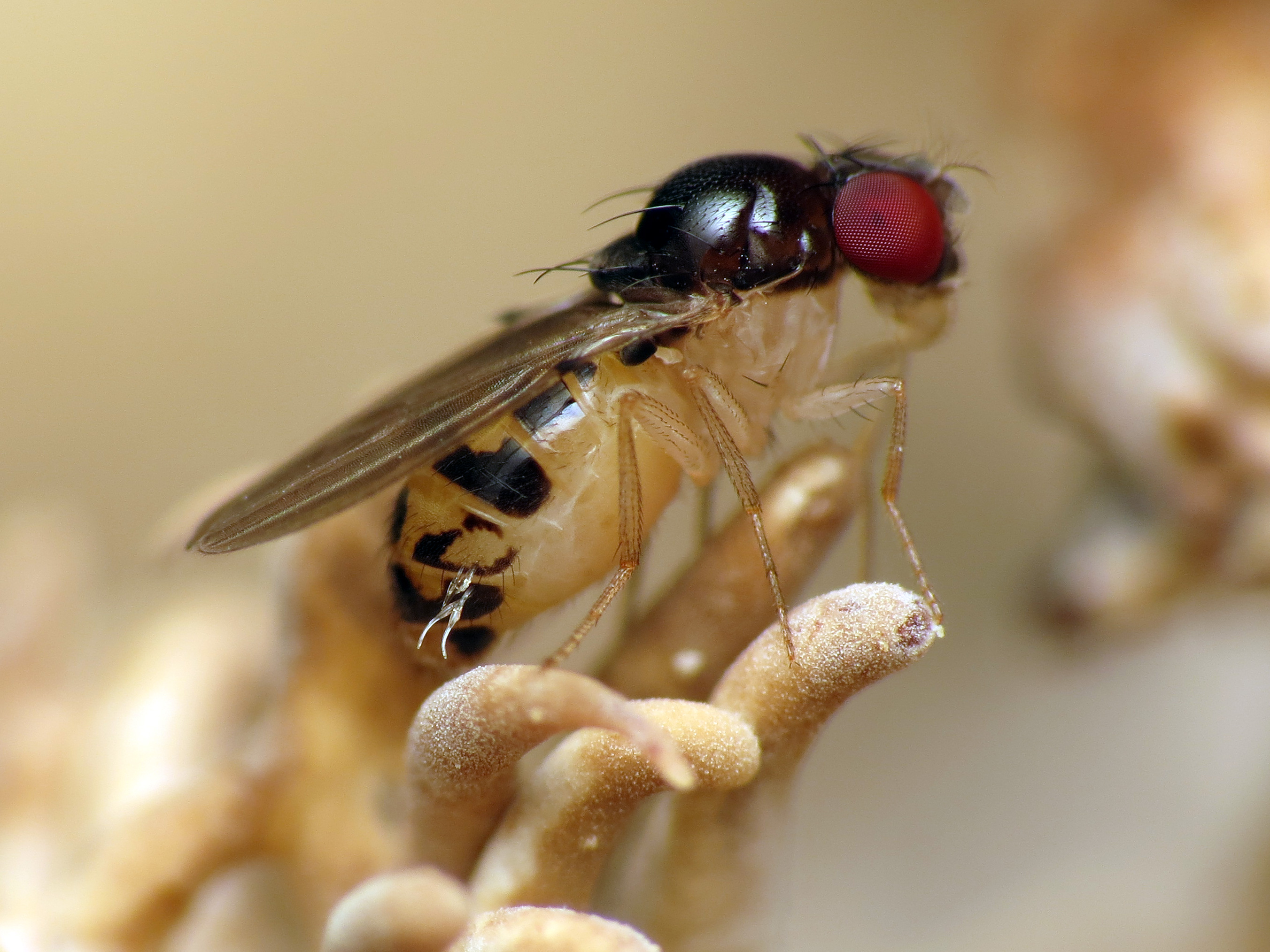

Scientific classification
- Domain: Eukaryota
- Kingdom: Animalia
- Phylum: Arthropoda
- Class: Insecta
- Order: Diptera
- Family: Drosophilidae
- Genus: Mycodrosophila
- Species: M. claytonae

Binomial name
- Mycodrosophila claytonae Wheeler & Takada, 1963

= Mycodrosophila claytonae =

Species of fly

Mycodrosophila claytonae is a species of fruit flies, insects in the family Drosophilidae.
