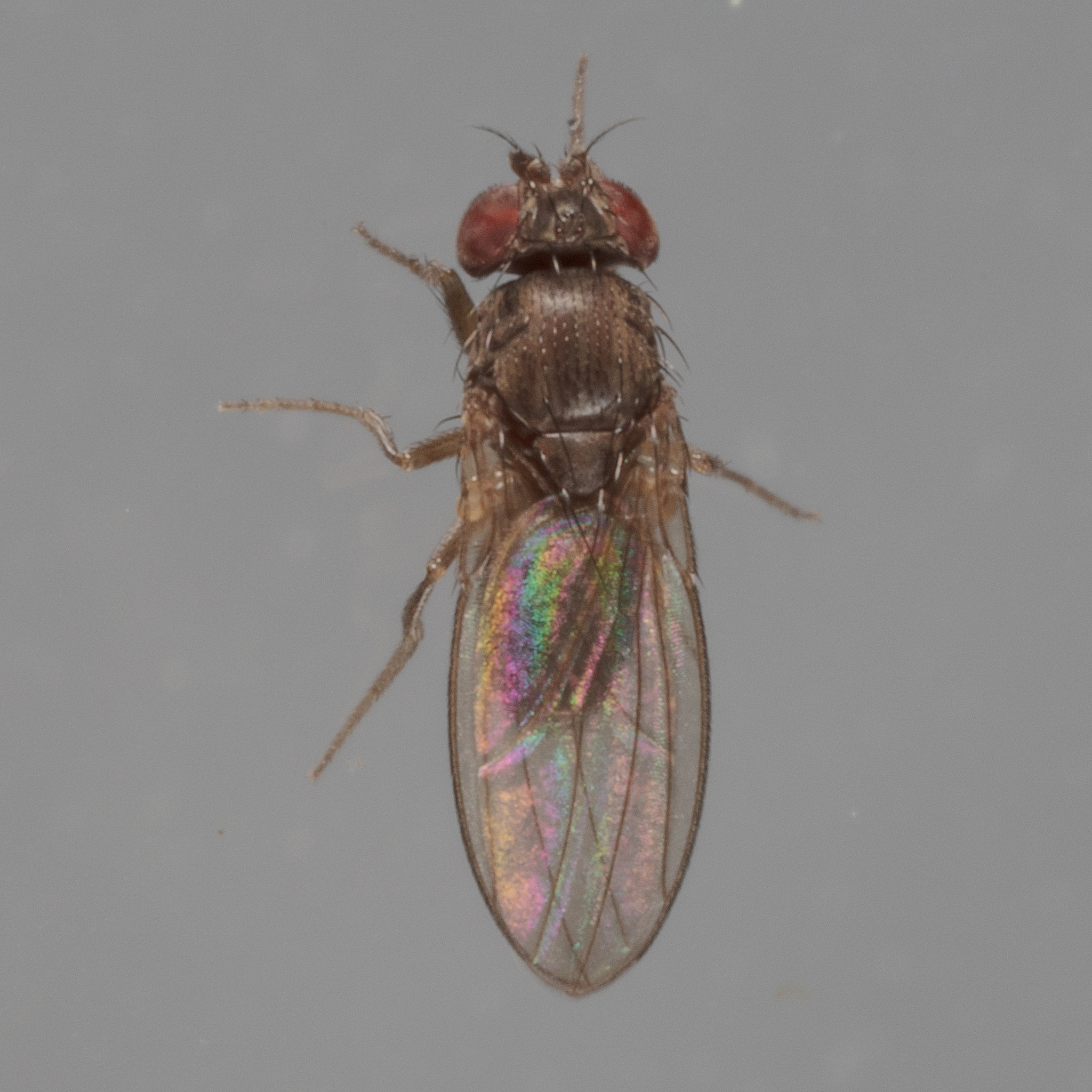
- Drosophila melanica

Scientific classification
- Kingdom: Animalia
- Phylum: Arthropoda
- Clade: Pancrustacea
- Class: Insecta
- Order: Diptera
- Family: Drosophilidae
- Genus: Drosophila
- Subgenus: Drosophila
- Species group: melanica

Species
- Drosophila colorata Walker, 1849; Drosophila euronotus Patterson and Ward, 1952; Drosophila longiserrata Toda, 1988; Drosophila melanica Sturtevant, 1916; Drosophila micromelanica Patterson, 1941; Drosophila moriwakii Okada & Kurokawa, 1957; Drosophila nigromelanica Patterson & Wheeler, 1942; Drosophila paramelanica Griffen, 1942; Drosophila tsigana Burla and Gloor, 1952

= Drosophila melanica species group =

Species group of fruit flies

The Drosophila melanica species group is a species group of fruit flies in the subgenus Drosophila.
