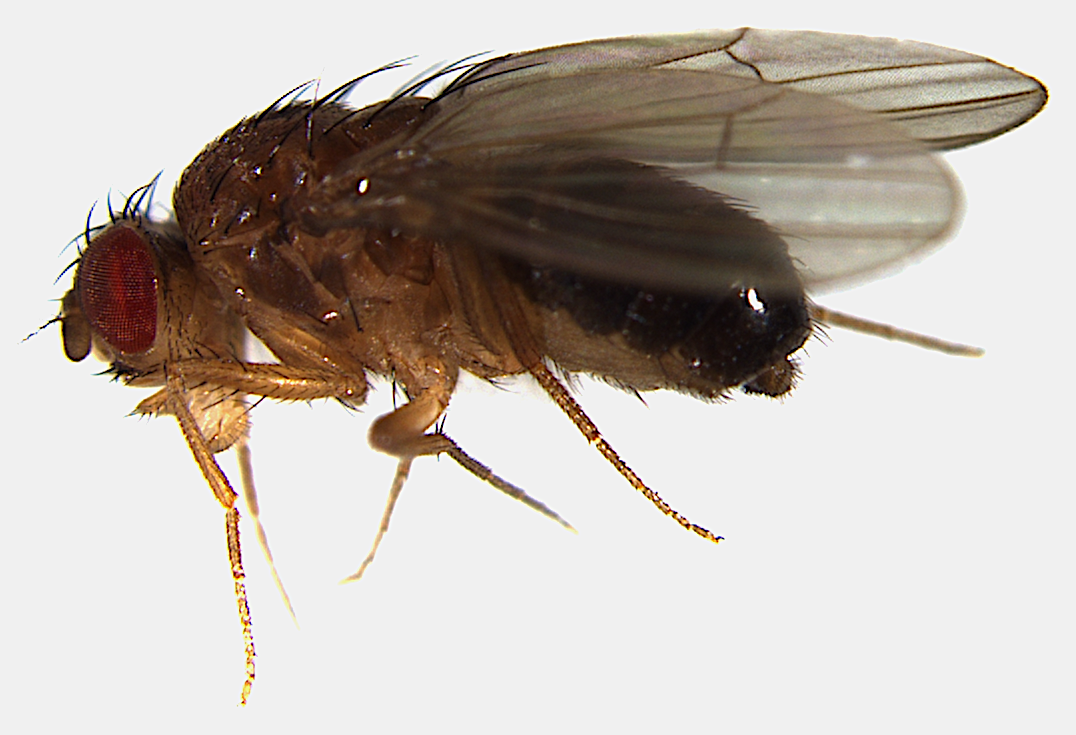
- Drosophila funebris male
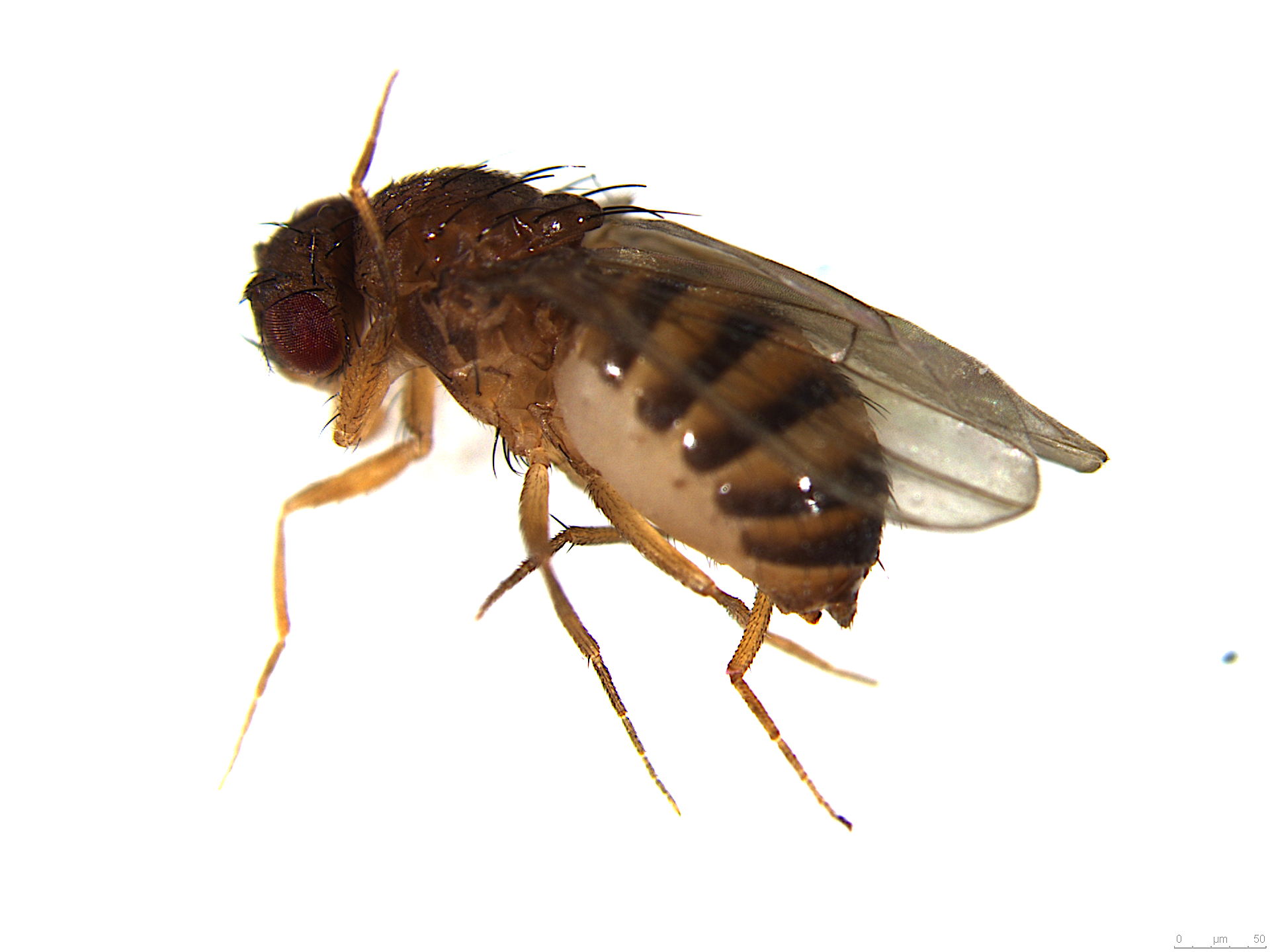
- Drosophila funebris female

Scientific classification
- Kingdom: Animalia
- Phylum: Arthropoda
- Class: Insecta
- Order: Diptera
- Family: Drosophilidae
- Genus: Drosophila
- Subgenus: Drosophila
- Species group: funebris
- Species: D. funebris

Binomial name
- Drosophila funebris (Fabricius, 1787)

Synonyms
- Musca funebris Fabricius, 1787 Drosophila funebris (Fabricius, 1787); Leucophenga atkinsoni Miller, 1921; Drosophila clarkii Hutton, 1901; Drosophila dudai Malloch, 1934; Musca erythrophthalma Panzer, 1794; Cordylura placida Harris, 1835

= Drosophila funebris =

Species of fly

Drosophila funebris is a species of fruit fly. It was originally described by Johan Christian Fabricius in 1787, who placed it in the genus Musca but is now the type species of the paraphyletic genus Drosophila. Drosophila funebris is a member of the Immigrans-tripunctata radiation of the subgenus Drosophila.

It is a cosmopolitan species. It is an exotic species in New Zealand. In Australia it is found in New South Wales, and Victoria.
