= Drosophila montana =

Scientific classification
- Kingdom: Animalia
- Phylum: Arthropoda
- Clade: Pancrustacea
- Class: Insecta
- Order: Diptera
- Family: Drosophilidae
- Subfamily: Drosophilinae
- Genus: Drosophila
- Subgenus: Drosophila
- Species group: virilis
- Species: D. montana

Binomial name
- Drosophila montana Stone, Griffen and Patter, 1942

Species of fly

Drosophila montana, colloquially referred to as a fruit fly, is a species of fly belonging to the family Drosophilidae and the genus Drosophila. It belongs to the montana phylad, which diverged from the D. virilis species group in South Asia before its migration into North America. It is typically found in the western United States, but has been seen in Europe and Asia. There are two color phases of the species, having either a yellowish or a blackish brown thorax. It is the species of Drosophila best adapted to cold environments.

== Description ==
D. montana were first described by Patterson and Wheeler in 1942. D. montana populations do not display homogeneous coloration. They have two forms of color, either light and dark. These possess a yellowish form or a blackish brown form, respectively. The light form has similar coloration to the species D. novamericana. The primary physical characteristic of the dark form is a blackish brown thorax. The dark form of D. montana also possesses a slightly brownish black stripe along its back, spanning the length of its acrostichal region. They also have legs with brown coloration, and the joints at the tips of their extremities are black.

Notable physical similarities exist between D. montana and D. flavomontana. Early studies mistakenly collected D. flavomontana when searching for D. montana, and species identification was only possible by observing fertility. While black puparia are typically attributed to D. montana and red puparia to D. flavomontana, genetic analysis has shown D. montana may produce red puparia. The two species sometimes produce hybrids, suggesting their coexistence.

== Distribution and habitat ==
Populations of D. montana have been historically found throughout North America, Europe, and Asia—most notably in Vancouver, Canada, Finland, and throughout the United States. Within the US, they are primarily located at high elevations along the Rocky Mountains from northern Idaho to Arizona. They have also been found in the Sierra Nevada mountain range and at lower altitudes within the Cascade Range and Coastal Range.

Drosophila montana typically reside near bodies of water within boreal forest regions, primarily in latitudes above 40 degrees North. Populations of D. montana further south will favor environments of higher elevation. Among all species in the Drosophila genus, D. montana is the most cold-tolerant species, with necessary qualities to survive the conditions of high altitude environments. Their exceptional capacity among the genus Drosophila for tolerating the cold enables the species to survive in high altitude and high latitude environments, which is reflected in their residences of choice.

== Phylogeny ==
The species belongs to the order of flies Diptera and the genus Drosophila. The genus Drosophila includes the virilis group, which diverged in the Early Miocene period, between 7 and 11 million years ago. This event divided the D. virilis species group into two clusters: the virilis and montana phylads. The latter encompasses several lineages including D. montana. This divergence occurred in South Asia, prior to their dispersion into North America. The populations of D. montana in North America, Asia, and Europe diverged between 450,000 and 900,000 years ago.

=== Cold adaptation ===
The species D. montana has several distinctive adaptations contributing to their high tolerance of cold. These include a generally elevated resistance and an acclimation response to cold, which can be induced, as well as a photoperiodic female reproductive diapause.

== Mating ==
Adult D. montana congregate in breeding areas, with multiple males pursuing a single female simultaneously. These breeding sites are generally on decomposing tree phloem and areas of sap flux. Mating occurs during the spring and summer months, with active reproduction prevalent up through July. By late August, most adults are in diapause and reproduction ceases. Like many species of Drosophila in temperate regions, there may be only one generation produced per year. This is likely facilitated by the ability to diapause.

=== Sexual conflict ===
Sexual conflict regarding the length of copulation is common for D. montana. Females prefer much shorter mating durations, and engage in physical struggles to attempt to throw off a male partner. However, males are often able to maintain sexual contact much longer than females dictate. This allows males to induce females' resistance to copulations, thus preventing the occurrence of females remating. This activity functions as a means of mate guarding.

=== Courtship songs ===
Similar to many species of Drosophila, D. montana emit "songs" from wing vibrations. These songs are performed while courting females and are a requirement to initiate mating. Females will convey attraction to males by spreading their wings, to which the male will respond by initiating copulation. Males' songs are subject to significant sexual selection in the species. Songs with fast qualities, such as high carrier frequency, are associated with males with high reproductive success. Overlapping frequencies with environmental background noise can interfere with females' ability to detect the songs, which may compromise mate selection.

With respect to the frequency of males' courtship songs, average inbreeding depression is approximately 14%. This differs significantly from other courtship song characteristics, which differ only by several percent due to inbreeding depression. This suggests that the fitness of male D. montana is associated with the frequency of their courtship songs. The frequency of males' songs is also subject to considerable outbreeding depression.

=== Cuticular hydrocarbons ===
D. montana produce cuticular hydrocarbons, commonly abbreviated CHCs, which act as olfactory or gustatory cues for attraction. While more effective in other species of Drosophila, CHCs are a significant factor in mate selection. In particular, female D. montana CHC characteristics are correlated with rates of female rejection of songs. This suggests that females' CHCs act as pheromones, attracting more males and therefore necessitating more rejections.

== Reproductive diapause ==
The typical longevity of adult D. montana in the laboratory is about 30 to 40 days, with females slightly outliving males. Adult female D. montana use photoperiod to determine seasonal changes and inform their reproductive diapause for overwintering. This allows them to reduce their aging, increase their chances of survival over the winter, and increase their longevity.

D. montana develop from egg to adult in about 26 to 30 days, depending on population and photoperiodic conditions. Individuals in the diapause state have arrested development and reproduction. They also become reliant on energy reserves in favor of feeding, so larger individuals typically fare better during diapause. D. montana develop quickly under shorter photoperiods, representative of autumn daylight conditions, to facilitate diapause. This development time is influenced by post-eclosion photoperiodic cues.

== Parental care ==
The desired locations of oviposition for D. montana coincide with their breeding sites. Observed substrates for oviposition include phloem and sap flux yeast growths on birch trees, as well as decomposing stalks of the plant Nuphar lutea, the yellow water lily. The virilis group of Drosophila, to which D. montana belongs, is generally known to oviposit in sap. The species has overlapping preferences for oviposition with D. littoralis. However, D. montana mate slightly earlier, and their larvae are more prevalent in drier substrates.

== Commensalism ==
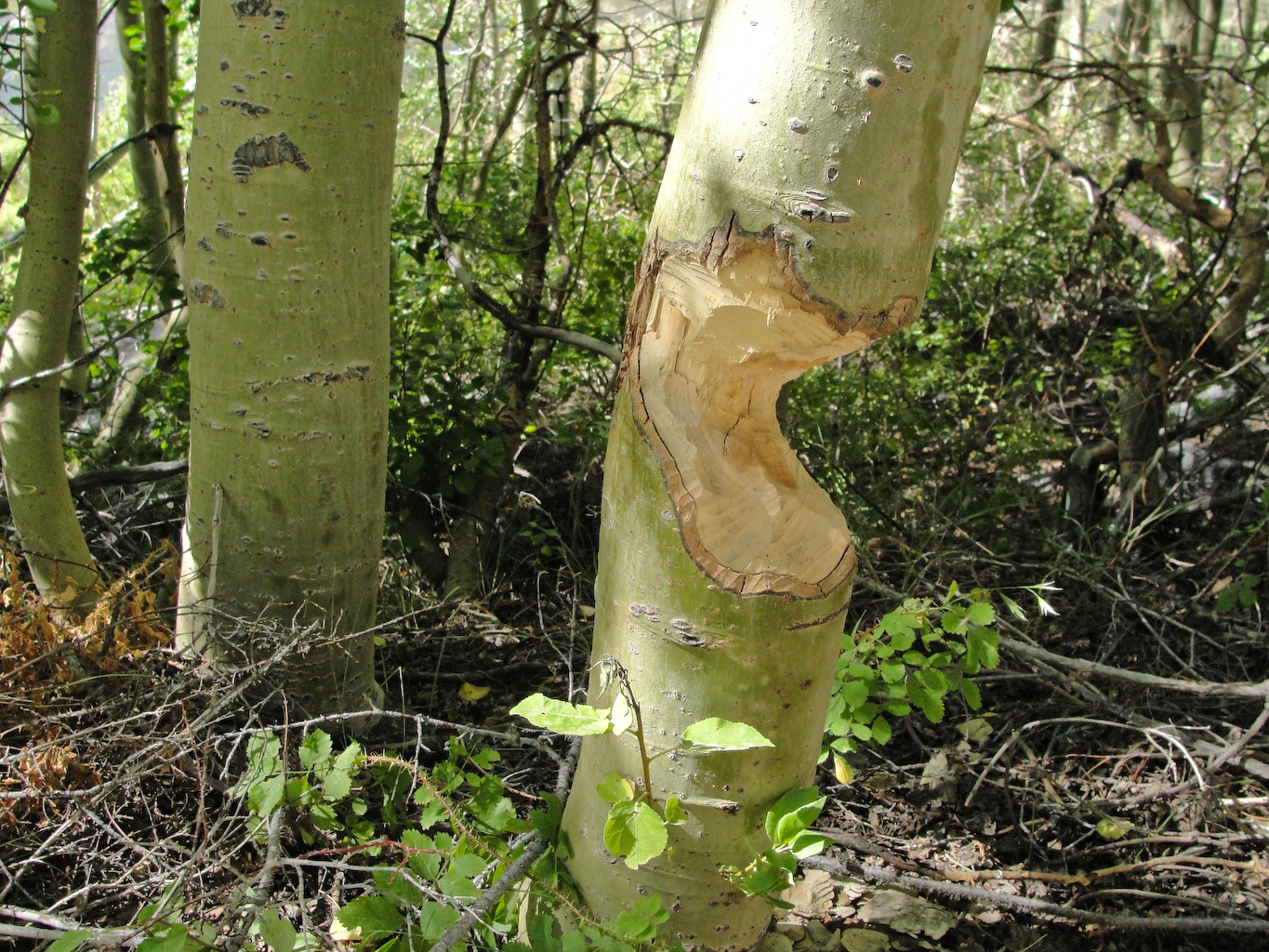
Beaver-chewed aspen, a popular site for oviposition

The collection of virilis group flies, including D. montana, is significantly more successful when close to known beaver residences. Beavers preferentially reside in bodies of water close to specific tree species including birch and alder, which they feed on in the winter. The beavers' feeding activity produce fallen trees and stripped bark that supply D. montana, as well as other members of the virilis group, with their preferred sites of oviposition. Alder trees are specifically cited as a favored site of D. montana oviposition. These shared resources support commensalism between the two species. For D. montana, this relationship is typically observed in North America, specifically with the beaver species Castor canadensis.
