= Drosophila quadrisetata species group =

Scientific classification
- Kingdom: Animalia
- Phylum: Arthropoda
- Class: Insecta
- Order: Diptera
- Family: Drosophilidae
- Genus: Drosophila
- Subgenus: Drosophila
- Species group: quadrisetata

Species
- Drosophila barutani Watabe & Liang, 1990; Drosophila beppui Toda and Peng, 1989; Drosophila karakasa Watabe & Liang, 1990; Drosophila multidentata Watabe & Zhang, 1990; Drosophila perlucida Zhang and Liang, 1995; Drosophila pilosa Watabe and Peng, 1991; Drosophila potamophila Toda and Peng, 1989; Drosophila quadrisetata Takada, Beppu and Toda, 1979

Species group of fruit flies

The Drosophila quadrisetata species group is a species group of fruit flies in the subgenus Drosophila.
