= Drosophila virilis species group =

Scientific classification
- Domain: Eukaryota
- Kingdom: Animalia
- Phylum: Arthropoda
- Class: Insecta
- Order: Diptera
- Family: Drosophilidae
- Subfamily: Drosophilinae
- Genus: Drosophila
- Subgenus: Drosophila
- Species group: virilis

Species
- Drosophila americana; Drosophila borealis; Drosophila canadiana; Drosophila ezoana; Drosophila flavomontana; Drosophila kanekoi; Drosophila lacicola; Drosophila littoralis; Drosophila lummei; Drosophila montana; Drosophila novamexicana; Drosophila virilis

Species group of fruit flies

The Drosophila virilis species group is a species group of fruit flies in the subgenus Drosophila.
