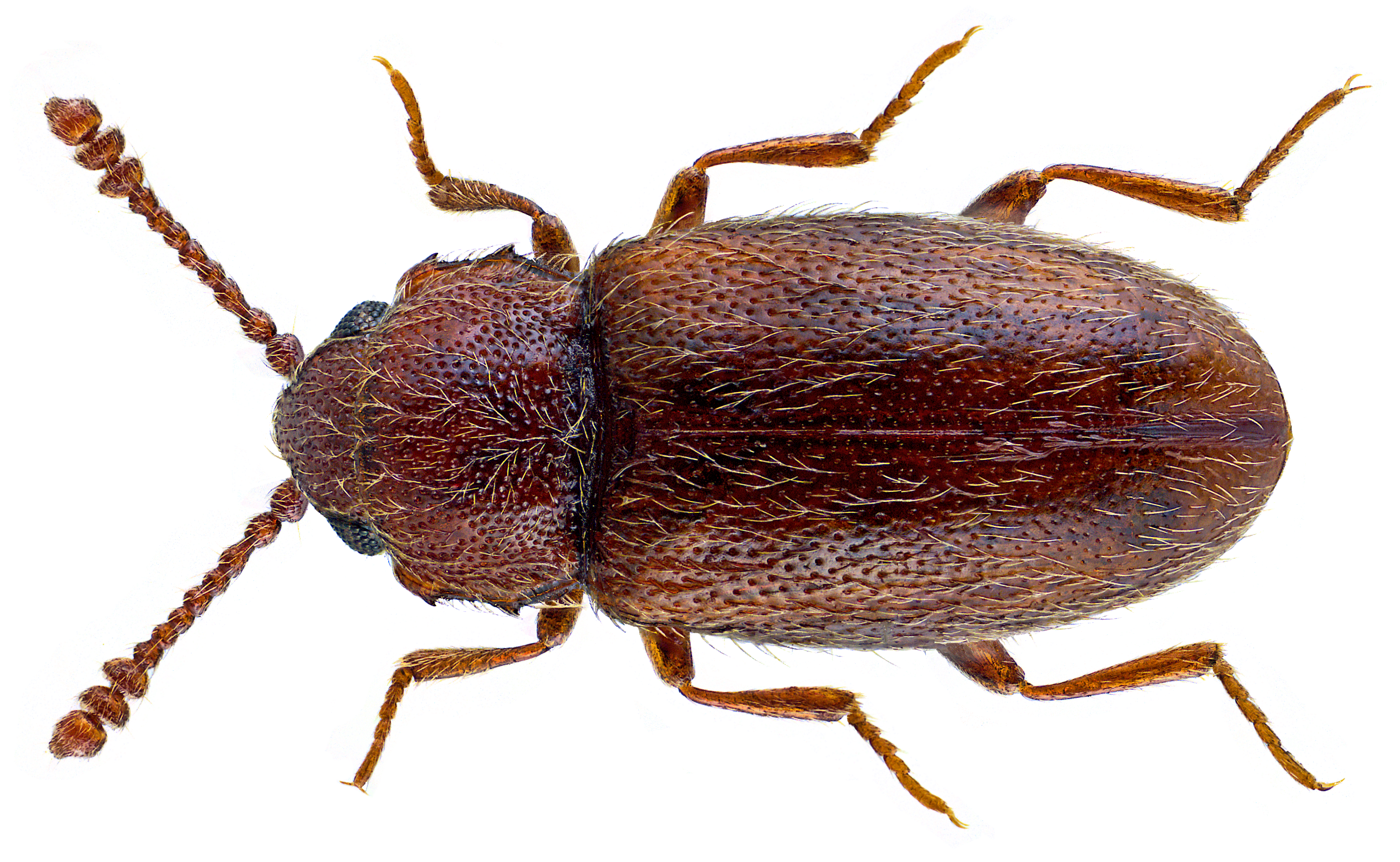
- Cryptophagus pilosus 2.3 mm (2.3 to 3.2 mm)

Scientific classification
- Kingdom: Animalia
- Phylum: Arthropoda
- Clade: Pancrustacea
- Class: Insecta
- Order: Coleoptera
- Suborder: Polyphaga
- Infraorder: Cucujiformia
- Family: Cryptophagidae
- Genus: Cryptophagus
- Species: C. pilosus

Binomial name
- Cryptophagus pilosus Gyllenhal, 1827

Synonyms
- Cryptophagus punctipennis

= Cryptophagus pilosus =

Species of beetle

Cryptophagus pilosus is a species of silken fungus beetle native to Europe. It is also present in the northwestern United States, where it is sometimes found as a nest associate of the yellowjacket species Vespula pensylvanica.
