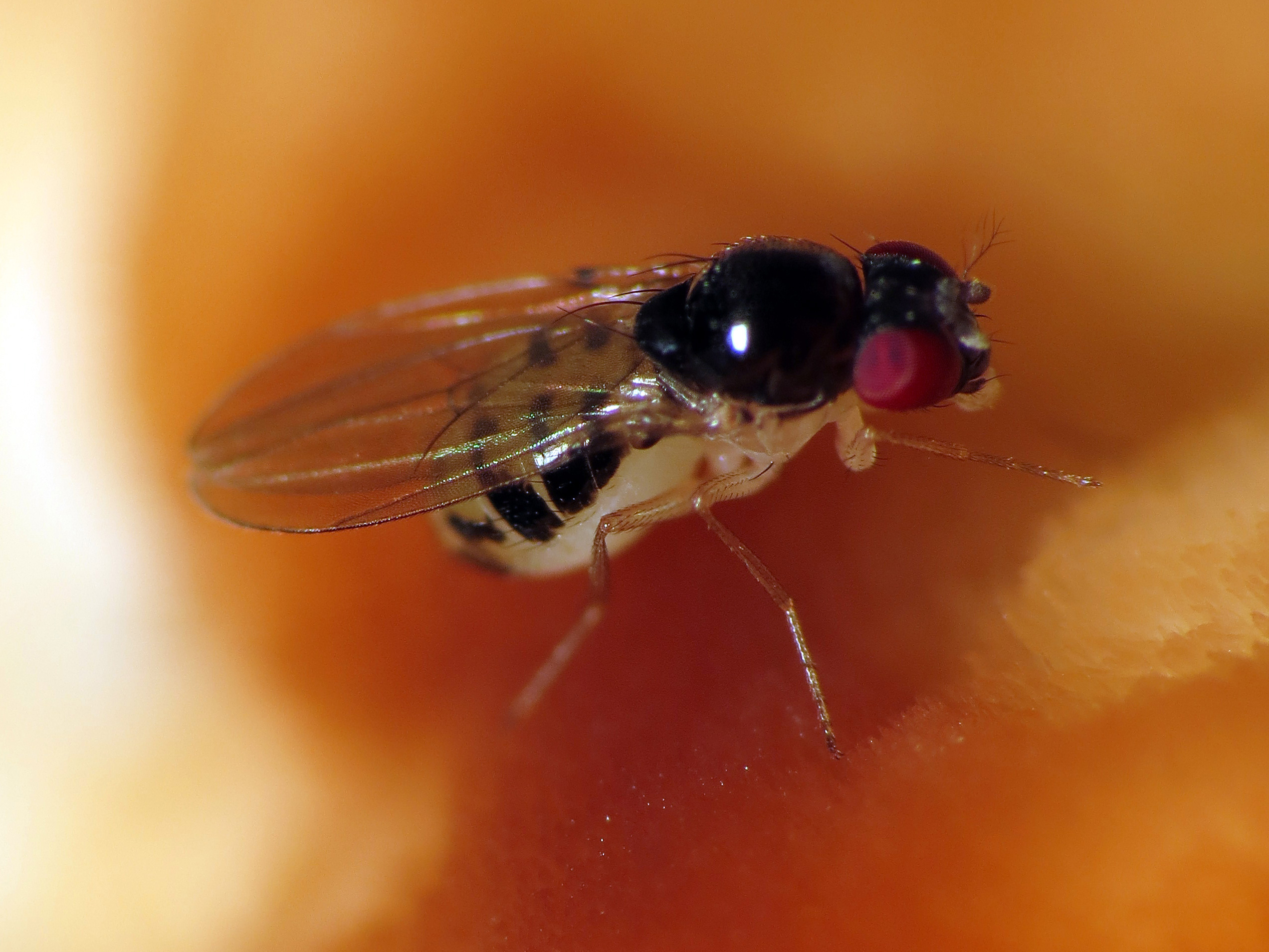

Scientific classification
- Domain: Eukaryota
- Kingdom: Animalia
- Phylum: Arthropoda
- Class: Insecta
- Order: Diptera
- Family: Drosophilidae
- Genus: Mycodrosophila
- Species: M. dimidiata

Binomial name
- Mycodrosophila dimidiata (Loew, 1862)

Synonyms
- Drosophila dimidiata Loew, 1862

= Mycodrosophila dimidiata =

Species of fly

Mycodrosophila dimidiata is a species of vinegar flies, insects in the family Drosophilidae.
