= Drosophila tripunctata species group =

Scientific classification
- Domain: Eukaryota
- Kingdom: Animalia
- Phylum: Arthropoda
- Class: Insecta
- Order: Diptera
- Family: Drosophilidae
- Subfamily: Drosophilinae
- Genus: Drosophila
- Subgenus: Drosophila
- Species group: tripunctata

Species subgroups
- tripunctata subgroup I; tripunctata subgroup II; tripunctata subgroup III; tripunctata subgroup IV

Species group of fruit flies

The Drosophila tripunctata species group is a species group of fruit flies in the subgenus Drosophila.
