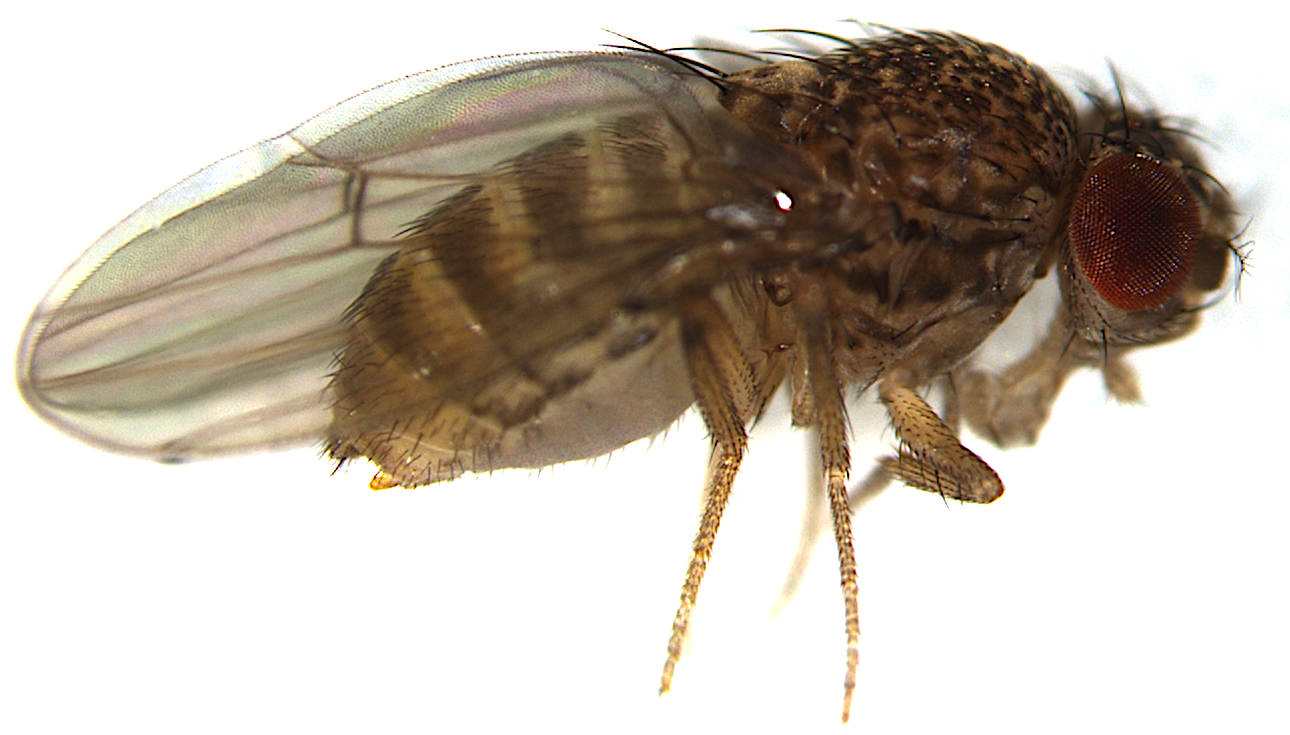
- A Drosophila mercatorum female

Scientific classification
- Kingdom: Animalia
- Phylum: Arthropoda
- Class: Insecta
- Order: Diptera
- Family: Drosophilidae
- Genus: Drosophila
- Species: D. mercatorum

Binomial name
- Drosophila mercatorum Patterson and Wheeler, 1942

= Drosophila mercatorum =

Species of fly

Drosophila mercatorum is a species of fruit fly in the genus Drosophila, repleta subgroup, described by Patterson and Wheeler in 1942. Thought to be native to South America, its subspecies D. m. mercatorum now has a cosmopolitan distribution. The other subspecies, D. m. pararepleta, is confined to the east of the Andes mountains.

It is used in scientific studies of parthenogenesis since it was discovered to have low levels of naturally occurring thelytoky.

== Gallery ==
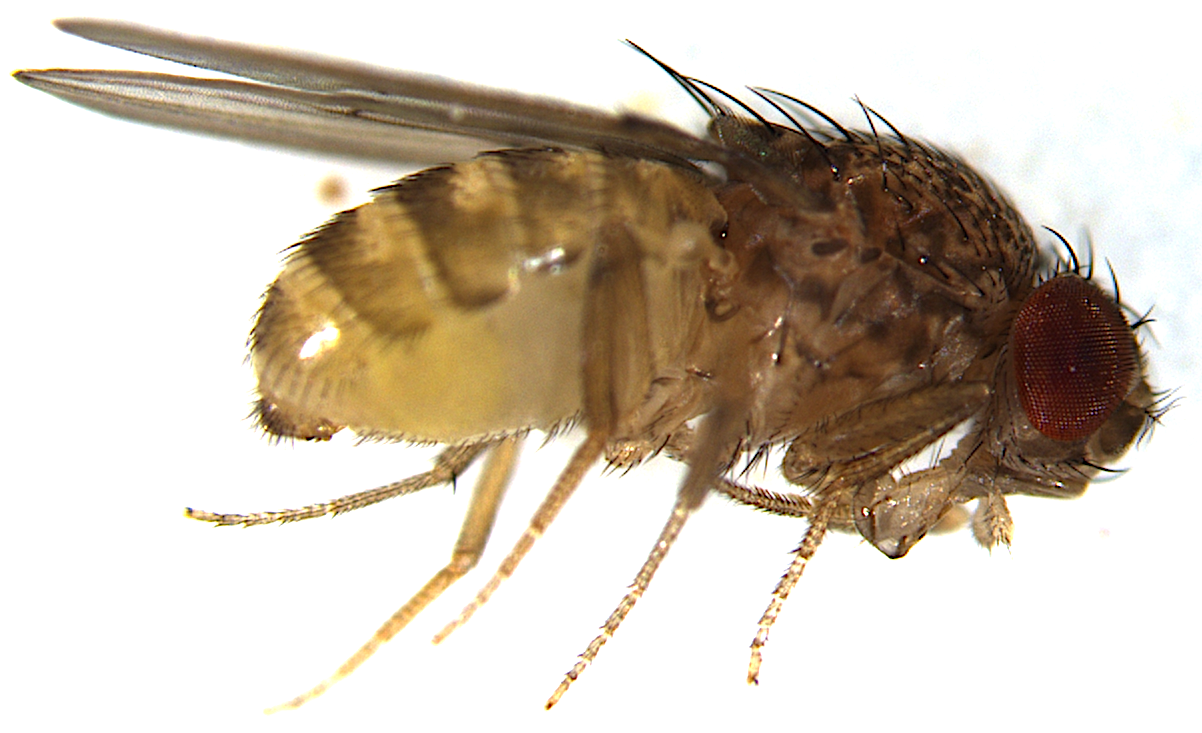
Drosophila mercatorum male
