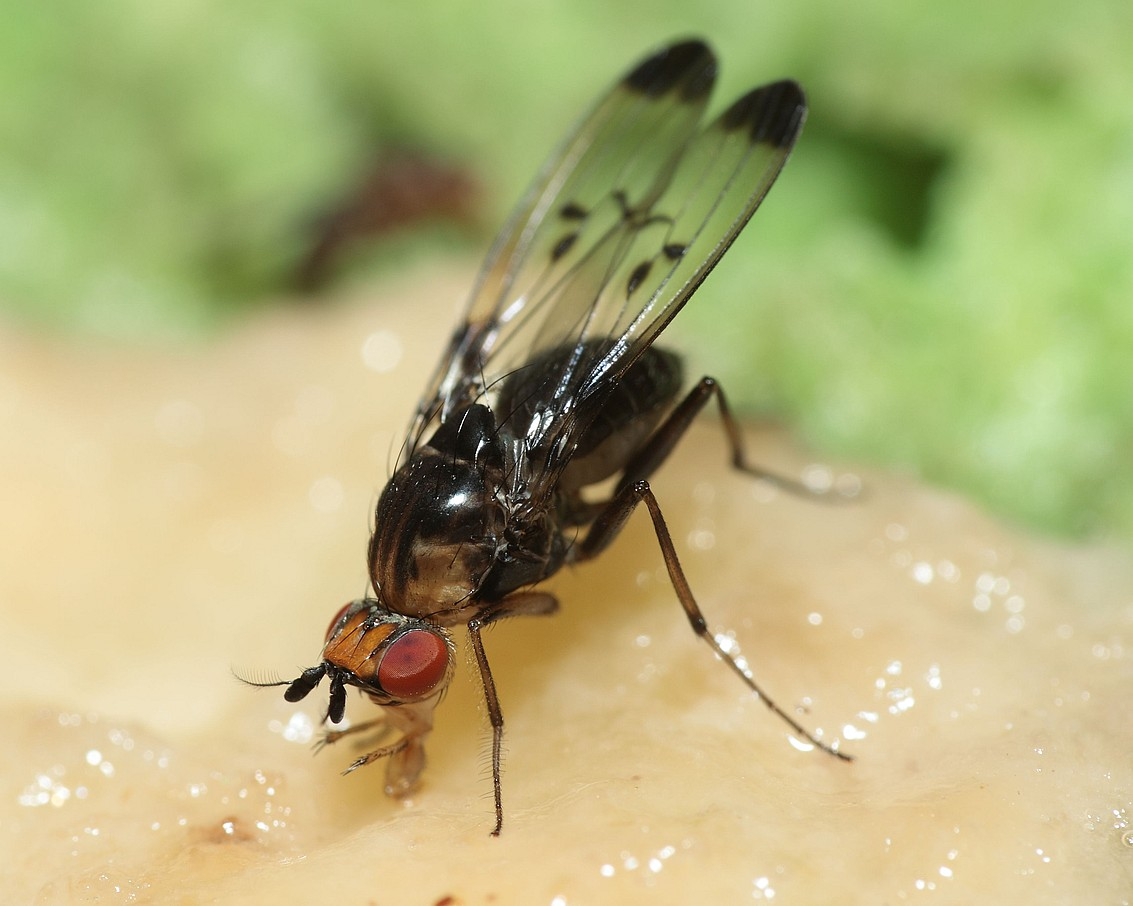

Scientific classification
- Kingdom: Animalia
- Phylum: Arthropoda
- Clade: Pancrustacea
- Class: Insecta
- Order: Diptera
- Family: Drosophilidae
- Genus: Drosophila
- Species: D. silvestris

Binomial name
- Drosophila silvestris (Perkins, 1910)

Synonyms
- Idiomyia silvestris Perkins, 1910

= Drosophila silvestris =

Species of fly

Drosophila silvestris is a large species of fly in the family Drosophilidae that are primarily black with yellow spots. As a rare species of fruit fly endemic to Hawaii ("the Big Island"), the fly often experiences reproductive isolation. Despite barriers in nature, D. silvestris is able to breed with D. heteroneura to create hybrid flies in the laboratory.

Male D. silvestris demonstrate many elaborate courtship displays like wing waving and courtship songs to attract females to their territories. To defend these territories, males behave aggressively and fight with one another. This species demonstrates sexual selection through female choice, as indicated by an evolutionary enhancement of extra tibia bristles occurring in certain D. silvestris populations in the last 700,000 years.

== Description ==
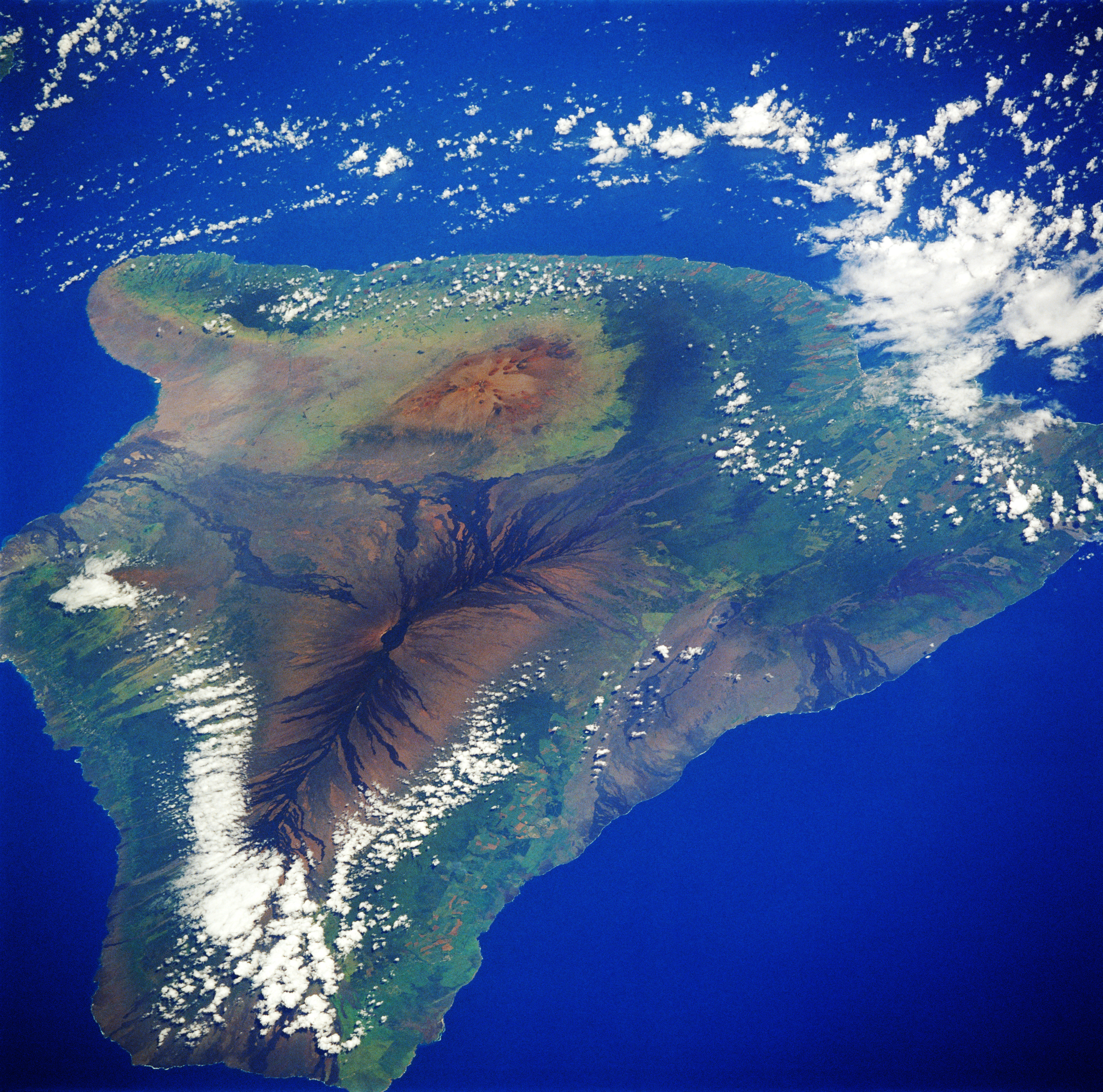
Island of Hawaii (the Big Island), USA

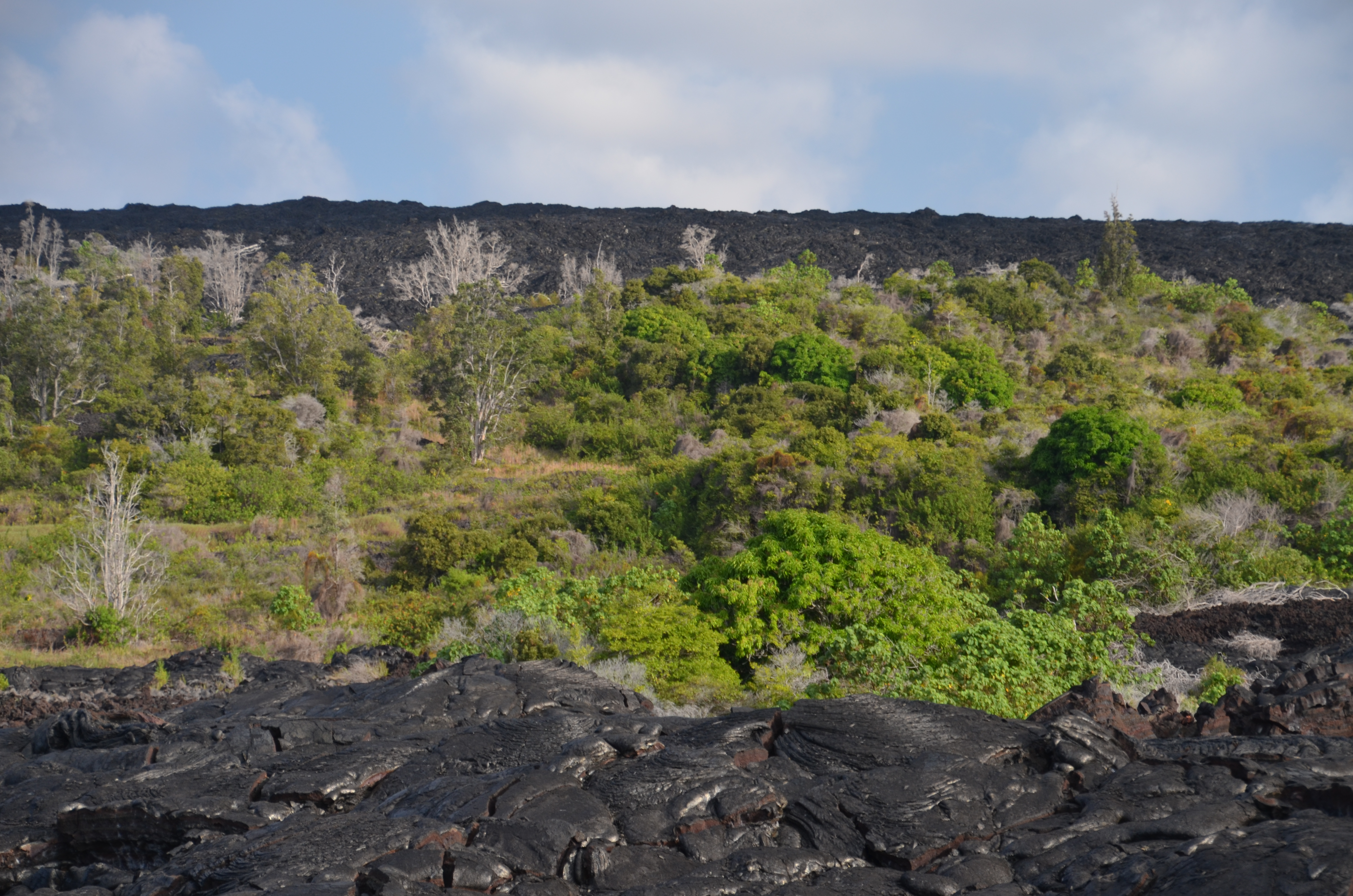
Kipuka encircled by lava flow in Hawaii

D. silvestris has a large body, long legs, and slim wings. This fly has a round head shape, which is typical for fruit flies. While females have a completely dark yellow or orange face, males have a black face with a horizontal yellow stripe between the frons and the clypeus. The antennae are black in males and yellow in females. The lateral part of the mesothorax varies from brown to black pigmentation, and yellow pigmentation can be found on the edge of the top side in some individuals.

Unlike females, males have two rows of long bristles along the upper sides of their forelegs. There is some variation in the number of male tibial bristles, as 20-30 extra bristles can be found in the middle of the two rows in north and east populations of Hawaii. These extra bristles create an irregular third row, which is related to the fly's courtship ritual and may have arisen due to geographic isolation from ancestral south and west populations.

This species is tolerant to colder temperatures and vulnerable to heat stress due to higher temperatures, which affect sperm mobility and survival. This is consistent with the flies' preference for cooler environments found at higher elevations. There are three phylogenetically early chromosomal inversions in D. silvestris that are associated with elevation changes, possibly reflecting an adaptive shift to altitude that contributed to evolution in Hawaiian Drosophila.

== Distribution and habitat ==
Currently there are about 1,000 Drosophila species native to the Hawaiian Islands, and, D. silvestris inhabits the Big Island.

Extensive lava flow from volcanoes fragments the geographical distribution of this species around the island. The flow of lava creates kipukas, isolated habitable patches of vegetated land, which can range from several square meters to several square kilometers in size. D. silvestris inhabits high-altitude, cool rainforests on the slopes of all five volcanoes in Hawaii (Mauna Kea, Mauna Loa, Kilauea, Hualalai and Kohala), specifically in altitudes ranging from 900–1,500 m (3,000–4,900 ft). The most ancestral populations of this fly species are found on Hualalai, the third youngest volcano on the island.

== Evolution and taxonomy ==
Topographic map of volcanoes on the Island of Hawaii

A quarter of the world's Drosophilidae species are endemic to the Hawaiian Islands evolving from an ancestral continental species which arrived 26 million years ago due to Hawaii's extremely diverse ecosystem and vegetation causing speciation. D. silvestris only inhabits the Island of Hawaii (the Big Island), which is 400,000 years old.

D. silvestris is a member of the "picture-winged" group, which consists of 112 Hawaiian Drosophila species known for their unique light and dark wing patterns. This group consists of four subgroups; D. silvestris is a part of the planitibia, or idiomyia, subgroup, which is known for consisting of flies that produce courtship songs by vibrating their wings. D. silvestris and other recently evolved planitibia species emit less complicated and higher frequency courtship songs compared to this subgroup's more ancestral flies.

D. heteroneura, another member of the plantibia subgroup, is a close relative of D. silvestris. Both of these fly species are native to Hawaii, and genetic similarities such as the sharing of a unique inversion in Chromosome 3 provide evidence that these fly species are derived from the same ancestral Hualalai population despite being morphologically distinct. The close evolutionary relationship between these two species is supported by a lack of this inversion in D. planitibia and D. differens, the more ancestral members of the planitibia subgroup.

One of the most easily visible differences between D. silvestris and D. heteroneura is in head shape: while D. silvestris heads are round, the D. heteroneura males have broad, hammer-shaped heads that reflect their head-butting fighting style. Polygenic inheritance may be responsible for this large between-species difference in male head morphology; it may have evolved to aid females in species-specific identification of mates. These species are mostly sympatric and broadly overlap in inhabiting geographic regions, though D. heteroneura prefers living in the understory of rainforests while D. silvestris typically selects areas of higher altitude. Field studies have shown males of both species sharing territories on a tree branch and females of both species laying eggs on the same host plant. These two species can produce fertile hybrids in the laboratory despite exhibiting reproductive isolation in the wild due to prezygotic barriers like species-specific mating behavior patterns.

Analysis of mtDNA restriction sites and phylogenies of males in Hawaiian fly populations found that D. silvestris with two rows of bristles have a closer genetic distance to D. heteroneura than D. silvestris with three rows of bristles. This close mtDNA lineage may be due to early hybridization between the two species in Hualalai or other areas in west Hawaii where the ancestral two-row population resides. West and east D. silvestris populations have distinct maternal lineages.

== Territoriality and Mating ==
=== Lekking ===
This species follows a lek mating arrangement where the female will observe potential mates and select based on the attractiveness of their courtship displays. Due to this mating system, female mate choice may play a significant role in the reproductive success of males. Males behave aggressively towards one another by shoving or chasing opponents away to control territory. This occurs when rival flies extend their wings laterally and stick their legs out in a "stilt-walk" then advance towards each other head-on while bobbing their heads up and down. Once they are at a close distance, they will directly interact by shoving the other male backwards. They will also use their forelegs to aggressively slash at each other. The evolution of the large body size in this species may be due to strong selection pressures since male body size is correlated with fighting success.

Adult males signal their willingness to mate by creating their lek, which incorporates a small segment 15–60 cm (5.9–23.6 in) long of a horizontal tree fern or bare plant stem. These easily visible leks are found 1.2–2.4 m (3 ft 11 in – 7 ft 10 in) above their plant substrate, where females feed and oviposit on fermenting wood. To defend against damage from winds, these leks are often chosen to be underneath the canopy of large trees. The number of males per plant varies, as males are often alone in their territories but can also cluster in groups. Up to ten males can occupy a single shrub by establishing separate territories on their own fern or branch. While these adult males are visibly exposed, immature males are often hidden. Females will also be concealed unless they are in search of courtship and are enticed by the wing-waving display of an adult male.

A male D. silvestris will walk back and forth in his lek while waving his wings to entice females to enter his territory. The flies have sharp eyesight, allowing the female to be visually informed by the male's species-specific pigment patterns to identify whether they are the same species. The male behaves agonistically towards any insect that enters his lek, so when a female D. silvestris comes towards him, he will behave aggressively until he is able to establish her identity.

=== Courtship ===
In the first step of courtship, one of the sexes laterally extends their wings and repeatedly waves them in air in the shape of a circle; this is followed by the male standing in front of the female. Once they are facing each other, the female will use her legs to slash at him and he will transition by circling around her. He will eventually stand behind her and place his head underneath her wings for 1.2 seconds before creating sounds by vibrating his laterally extended wings. In addition to producing simple courtship songs by vibrating his wings, the male will create low-amplitude purring noises by bobbing his abdomen. Next, the male D. silvestris will stroke his bristled foreleg tibia against the abdomen of the female to stimulate her. He will then attempt to inseminate the female by moving the tip of his abdomen towards her genitalia.

The additional 20–30 tibial bristles found in D. silvestris males located in north and east Hawaii populations are a secondary sex characteristic and indicate the influence of sexual selection. Because the island of Hawaii is less than 500,000 years old, these extra bristles may represent a relatively new physical enhancement in courtship derived from the ancestral trait of only having two rows of bristles. Females from the derived populations (in the north and east) will mate with males from both the derived and ancestral populations. In contrast, females from the ancestral populations (in the south and west) will not mate with males from derived populations, instead only selecting males with only two rows of bristles.

Sperm from the male will be stored inside the female's spermatheca. A female can easily mate again if her supply of sperm decreases; this contrasts with the wide variability of male reproductive success, as many males rarely mate and some may even remain virgins.

== Life cycle ==
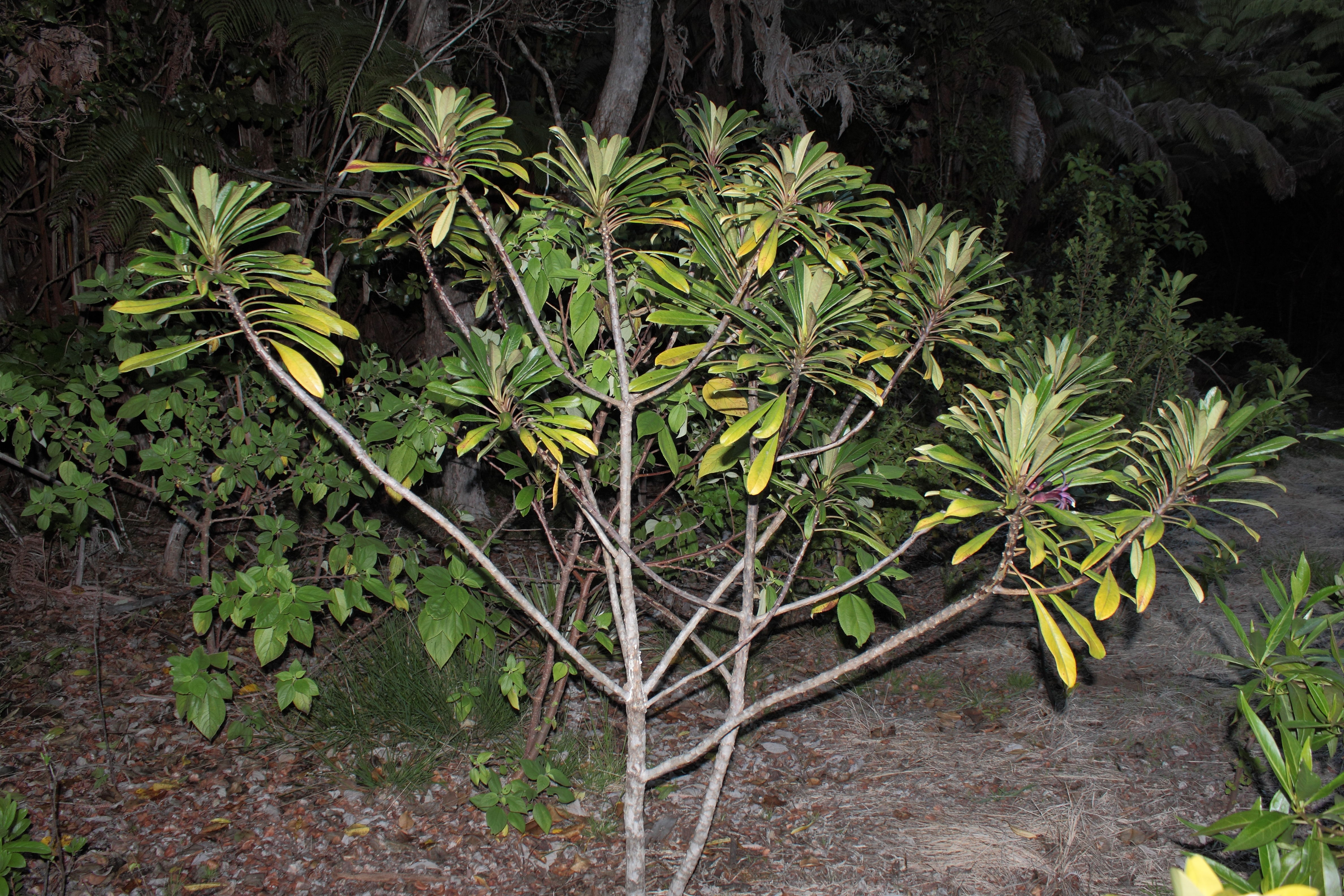
Clermontia, a common lobelioid Hawaiian host plant for D. silvestris

D. silvestris females deposit their eggs on the decaying or fermenting bark of principal host plant Clermontia, a large, branched shrub scattered throughout the understory of Hawaiian rainforests. Egg deposition also occurs on the fermenting bark of Cyanea and Cheirodendron.

For females, the pupal stage is when ovarian development starts. The ovaries do not fully mature until three weeks after eclosion. Neither sex is fully mature when it ecloses from the pupae. Males mature earlier: about one week after eclosion at which point their sperm is motile. Vitellogenesis, or the deposition of yolk into an oocyte, is necessary for ovarian maturation in a female. When an immature female is housed with sexually mature males, the female is behaviorally unreceptive to their sexual displays, yet vitellogenesis will occur about four days earlier than expected.

== Food resources ==
Larvae and adults primarily feed on the fermenting bark of Clermontia due to its relatively large size compared to other Hawaiian lobelioids. The major ancestral host plant for members of plantibia subgroup is Clermontia, with derived species like D. silvestris evolving to feed on Cyanea and Cheirodendron, other flowering plants where females deposit their eggs. These plant substrates are often located in the dense understory of Hawaiian rainforests, underneath lekking sites.

== Enemies ==
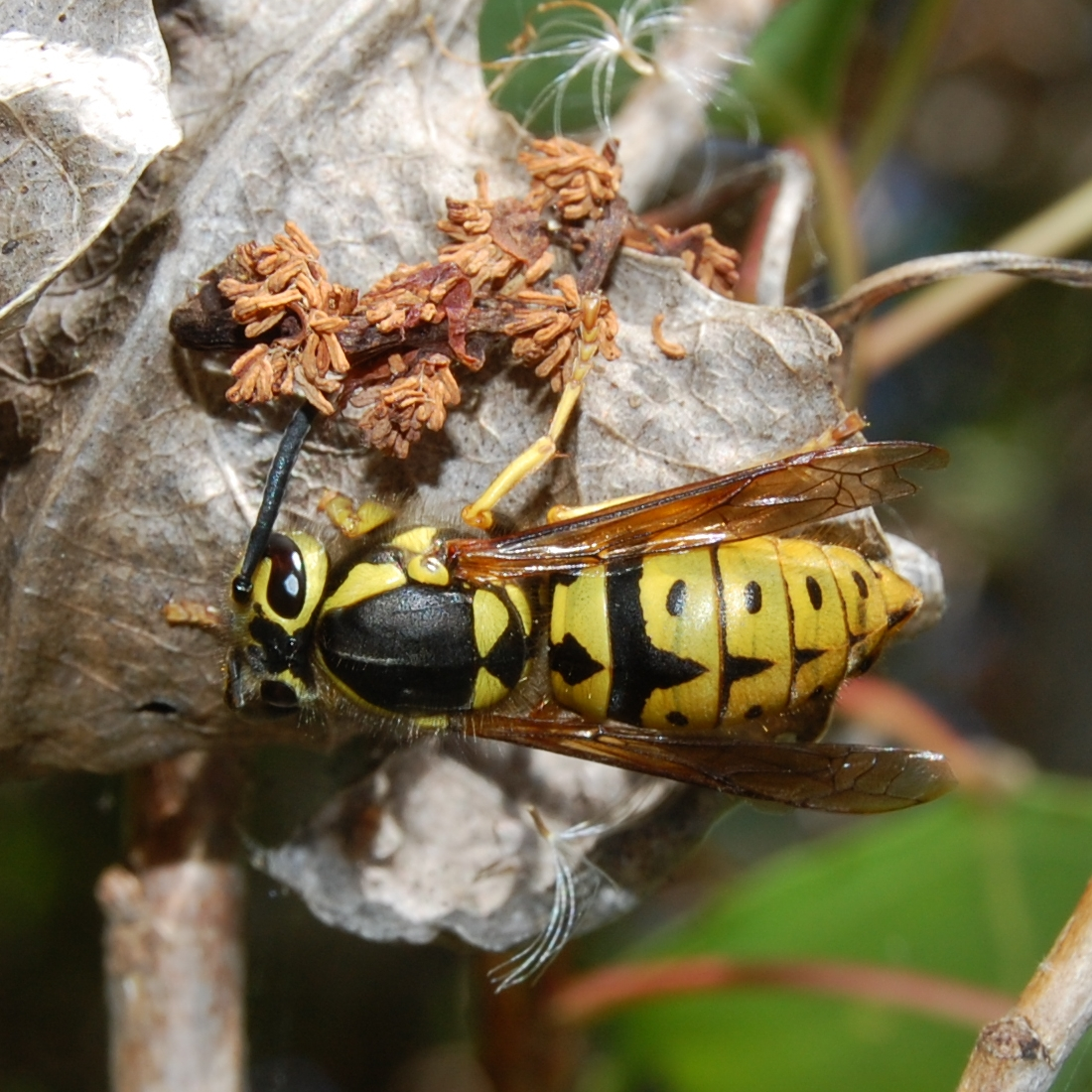
Vespula pensylvanica, a predator of D. silvestris

Vespula pensyIvanica, a species of yellowjacket, is invasive to Hawaii and preys on D. silvestris and other members of Drosophila, resulting in significant population decline. Other predators include insect-eating birds endemic to Hawaii, such as the Chasiempsis sandwichens.

== Conservation ==
D. silvestris and other flies in Hawaiian rainforests are sensitive to habitat loss due to climate change. Habitat loss due to the loss of endemic fauna as temperatures steadily rise may impact the distribution and survivability of these flies, which are already rare and declining. Habitat loss can be further exacerbated by logging, agriculture, and other human practices that destroy natural terrain. Feral pigs, goats, and other mammals will eat host plants like Clermontia and trample on terrain, threatening the habitat and food sources for these flies. In addition, trampling on terrain creates favorable soil conditions for the proliferation of invasive plant species that can outcompete native species. D. silvestris and other "picture-winged" flies interact with host plants and other organisms in Hawaiian rainforests, making them helpful for measuring the health of the ecosystem.
