= Heptyl butyrate =

Names
- IUPAC name Heptyl butanoate
- Other names Heptyl butyrate

Identifiers
CAS Number	5870-93-9
3D model (JSmol)	Interactive image
ChEBI	CHEBI:179373
ChEMBL	ChEMBL3186512
ChemSpider	56351
ECHA InfoCard	100.025.023
EC Number	227-526-5
PubChem CID	62592
UNII	6YF38H29F1
CompTox Dashboard (EPA)	0042038
- InChI: InChI=1S/C11H22O2/c1-3-5-6-7-8-10-13-11(12)9-4-2/h3-10H2,1-2H3 Key: JPQHLIYIQARLQM-UHFFFAOYSA-N
- SMILES: CCCCCCCOC(=O)CCC

Properties
Chemical formula	C_{11}H_{22}O_{2}
Molar mass	186.295 g·mol^{−1}
Odor	chamomile-like
- Except where otherwise noted, data are given for materials in their standard state (at 25 °C [77 °F], 100 kPa). Infobox references

Heptyl butyrate is an ester that is naturally occurring in fresh apples, plums, and babaco fruits. It is the condensation product of heptyl alcohol and butyric acid. It is available commercially for use as bait in traps yellowjackets and wasps and is specific for these types of pests rather than honeybees and other beneficial insects. It is considered a "safe, food-grade compound" by the United States Environmental Protection Agency.
