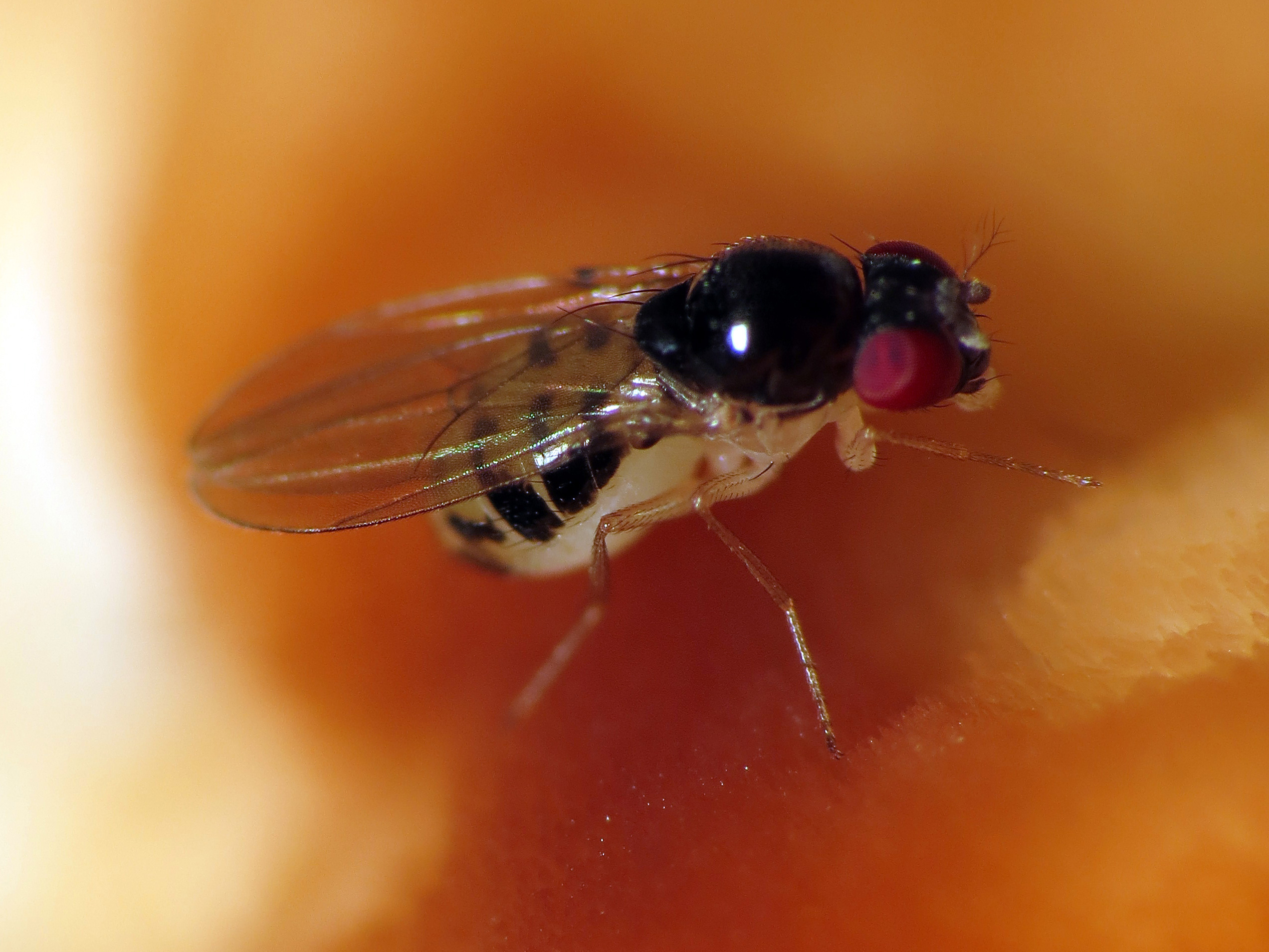
- Mycodrosophila dimidiata

Scientific classification
- Kingdom: Animalia
- Phylum: Arthropoda
- Class: Insecta
- Order: Diptera
- Family: Drosophilidae
- Subfamily: Drosophilinae
- Genus: Mycodrosophila; Oldenberg, 1914

Diversity
- at least 120 species

= Mycodrosophila =

Genus of flies

Mycodrosophila is a genus of vinegar flies, insects in the family Drosophilidae. There are at least 120 described species in Mycodrosophila.

It belongs to the monophyletic Zygothrica genus group consisting of the mycophagous genera Hirtodrosophila, Mycodrosophila, Paramycodrosophila, and Zygothrica. It is itself monophyletic.

== See also ==
- List of Mycodrosophila species
