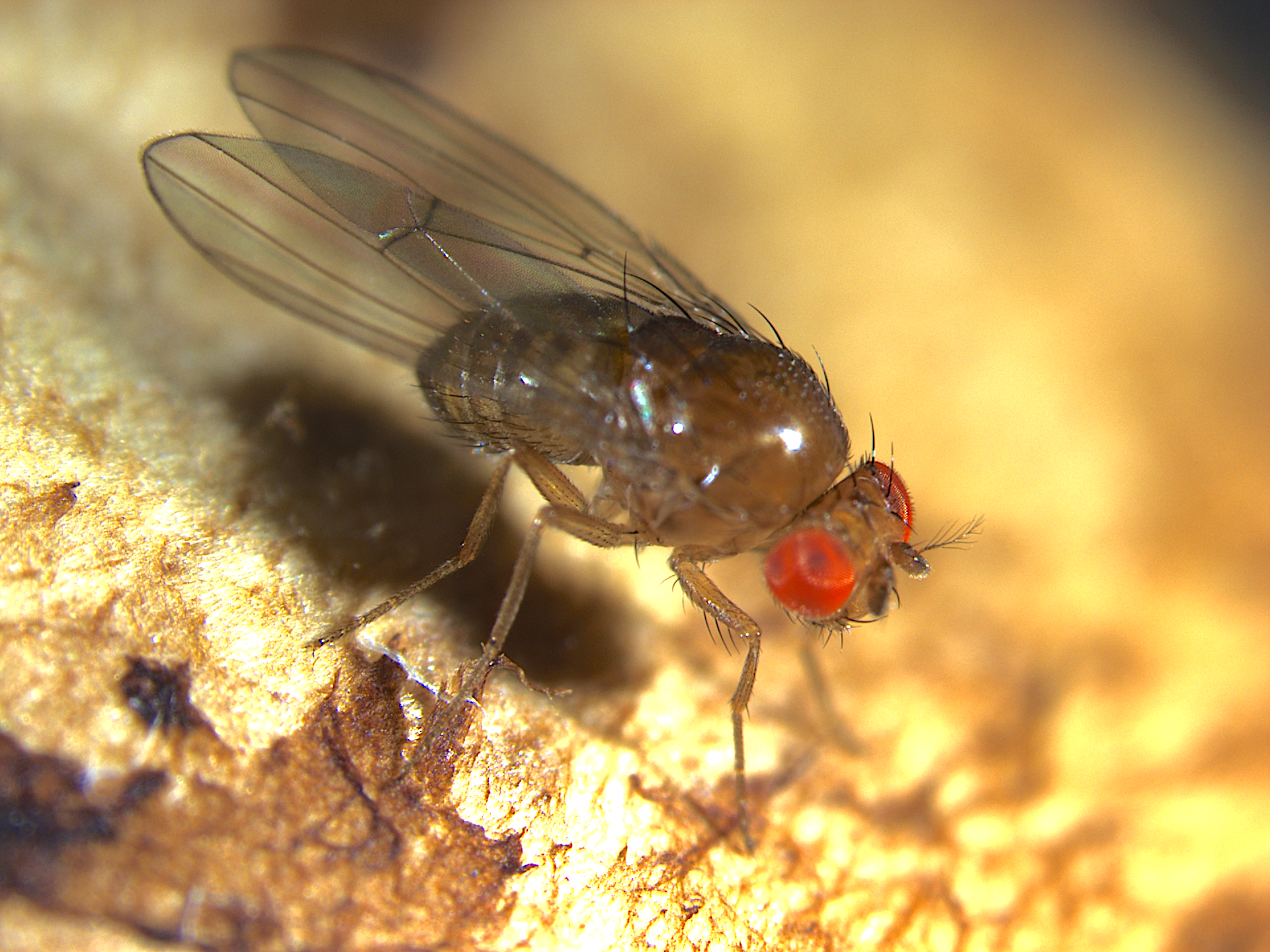
- Drosophila innubila of the Drosophila quinaria species group

Scientific classification
- Kingdom: Animalia
- Phylum: Arthropoda
- Class: Insecta
- Order: Diptera
- Family: Drosophilidae
- Genus: Drosophila
- Subgenus: Drosophila

Species groups
- See text

= Immigrans-tripunctata radiation =

Species group of the subgenus Drosophila

The immigrans-tripunctata radiation is a speciose lineage of Drosophila flies, including over 300 species. The immigrans-tripunctata radiation is a sister lineage to most other members of the subgenus Drosophila. A number of species have had their genomes or transcriptomes sequenced for evolutionary studies using Drosophila.

== Species groups ==
The following species groups and numbers largely derive from O'Grady (2018).

- Immigrans species group (106 species)
- Tripunctata species group (83 species)
- Quinaria species group (35 species)
- Guarani species group (24 species)
- Cardini species group (16 species)
- Calloptera species group (8 species)
- Bizonata species group (7 species)
- Funebris species group (7 species)
- Testacea species group (4 species)

== Sequenced genomes or transcriptomes ==
The following species have extensive genetic sequence data available as of August 2019.

Quinaria species group

- Drosophila guttifera
- Drosophila innubila
- Drosophila falleni
- Drosophila phalerata

Immigrans species group

- Drosophila albomicans

Testacea species group

- Drosophila neotestacea

Work published in 2021 and 2024 has greatly expanded the coverage of genomes in this group with 18 new genomes in 2024. The 2024 work presents the first genomes for the tripunctata, testacea, and funebris groups.

== Gallery ==
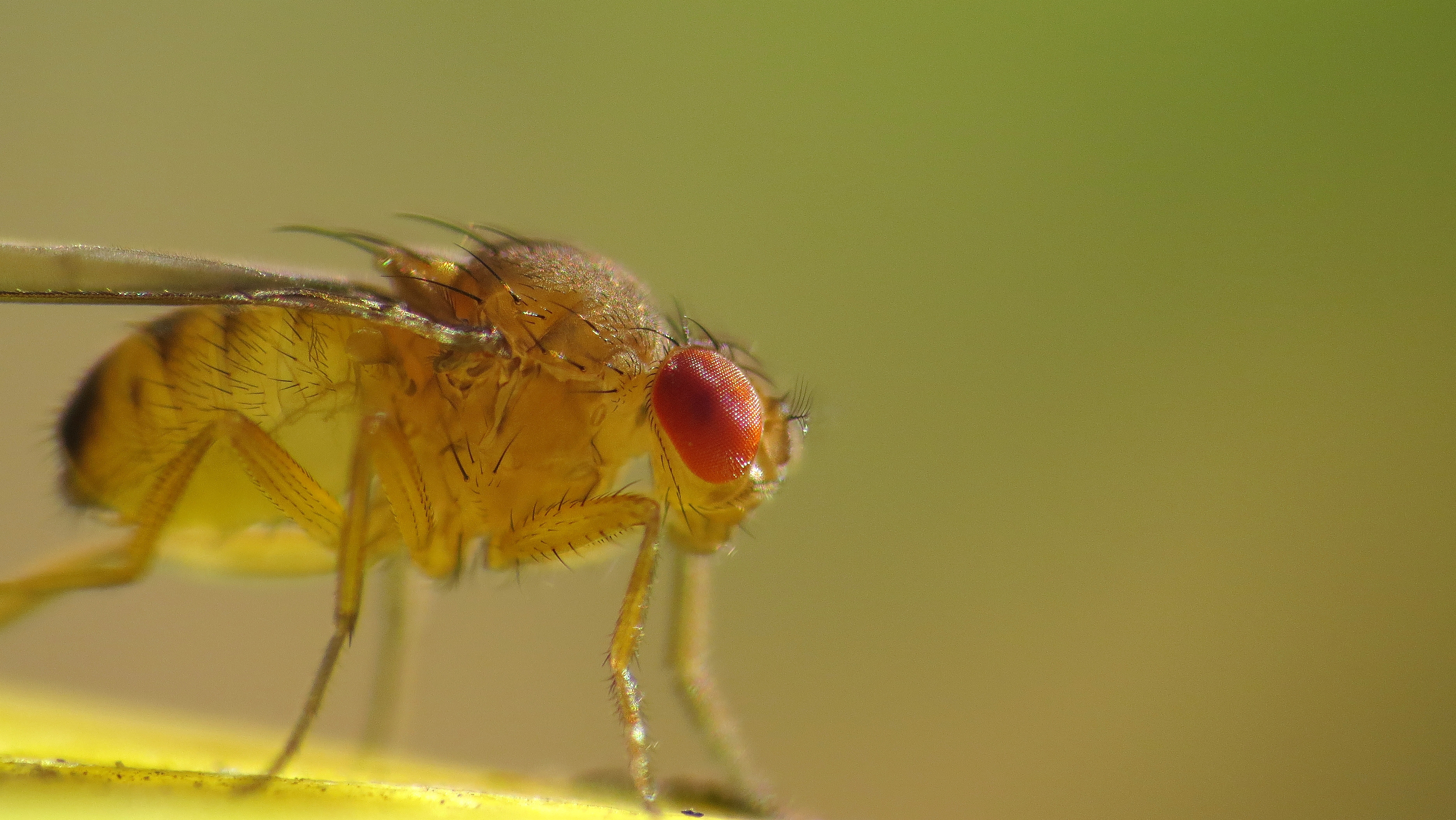
D. immigrans (Immigrans species group)

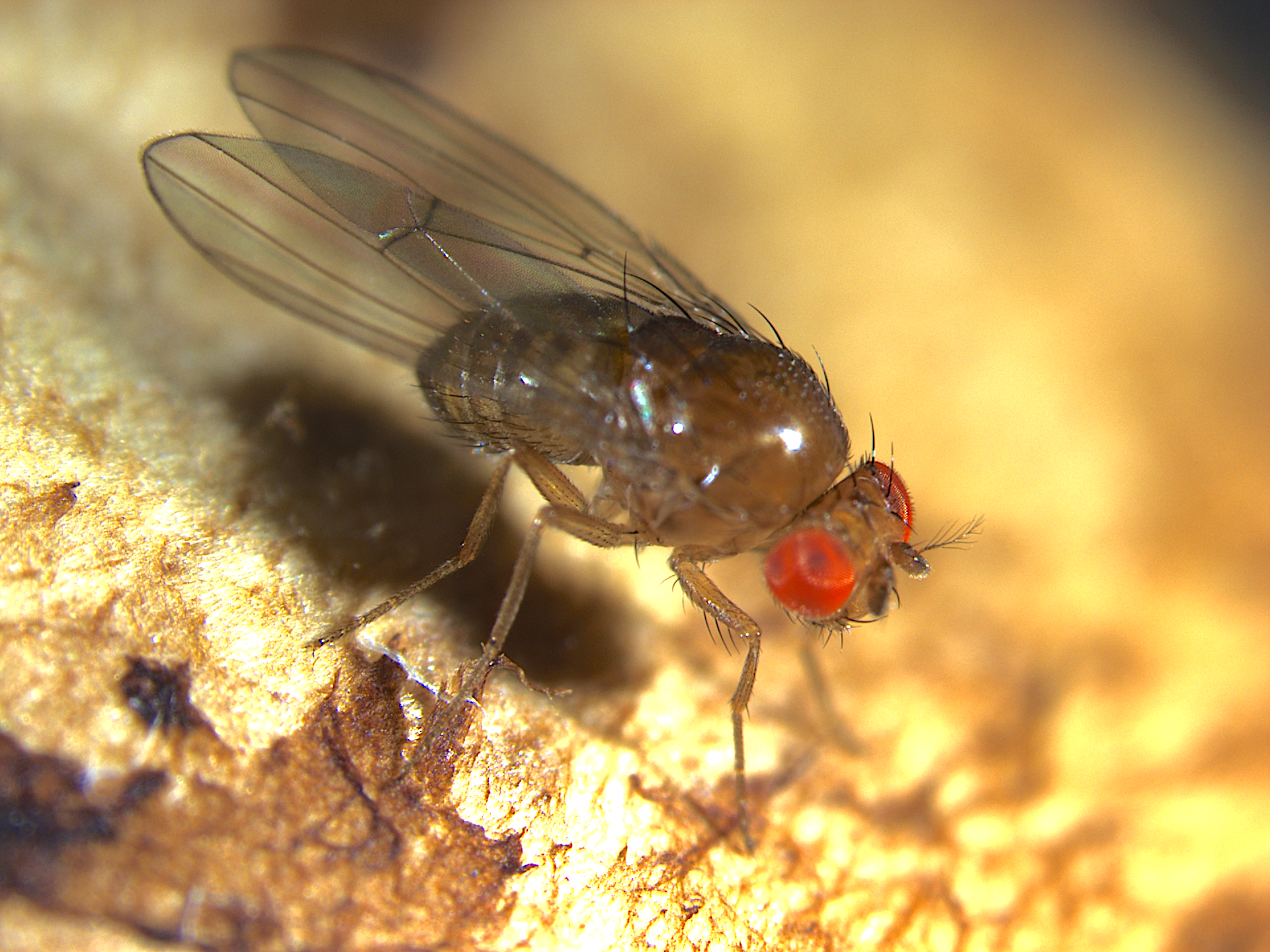
D. innubila (Quinaria species group)

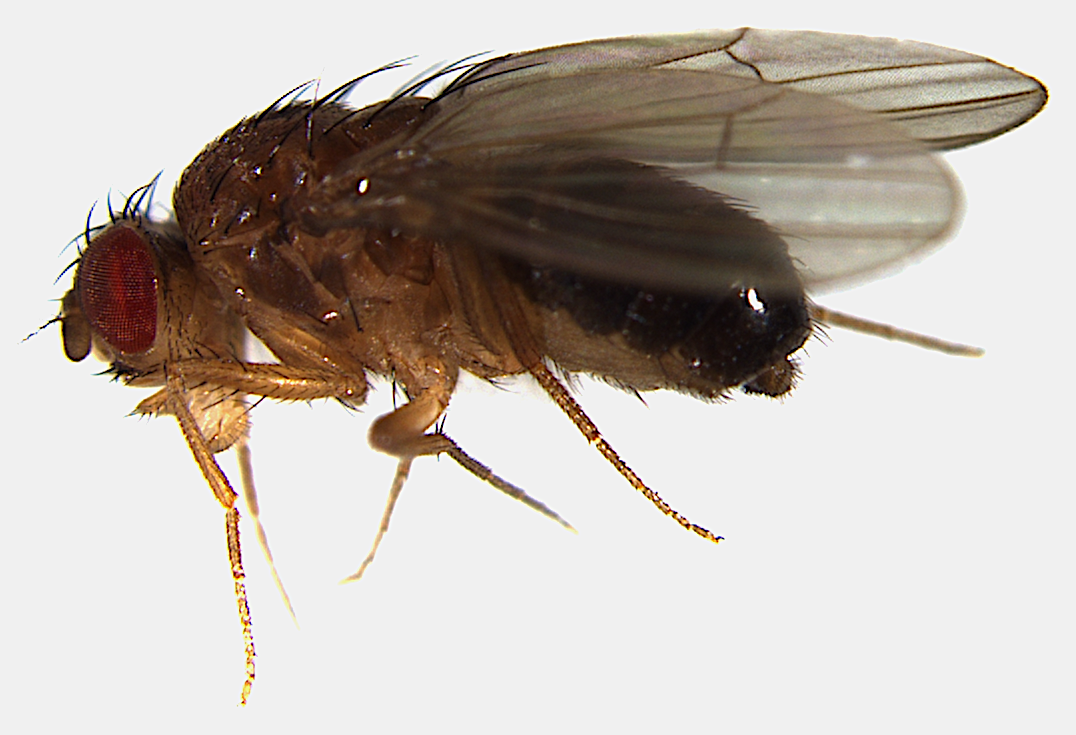
Drosophila funebris (Funebris species group)

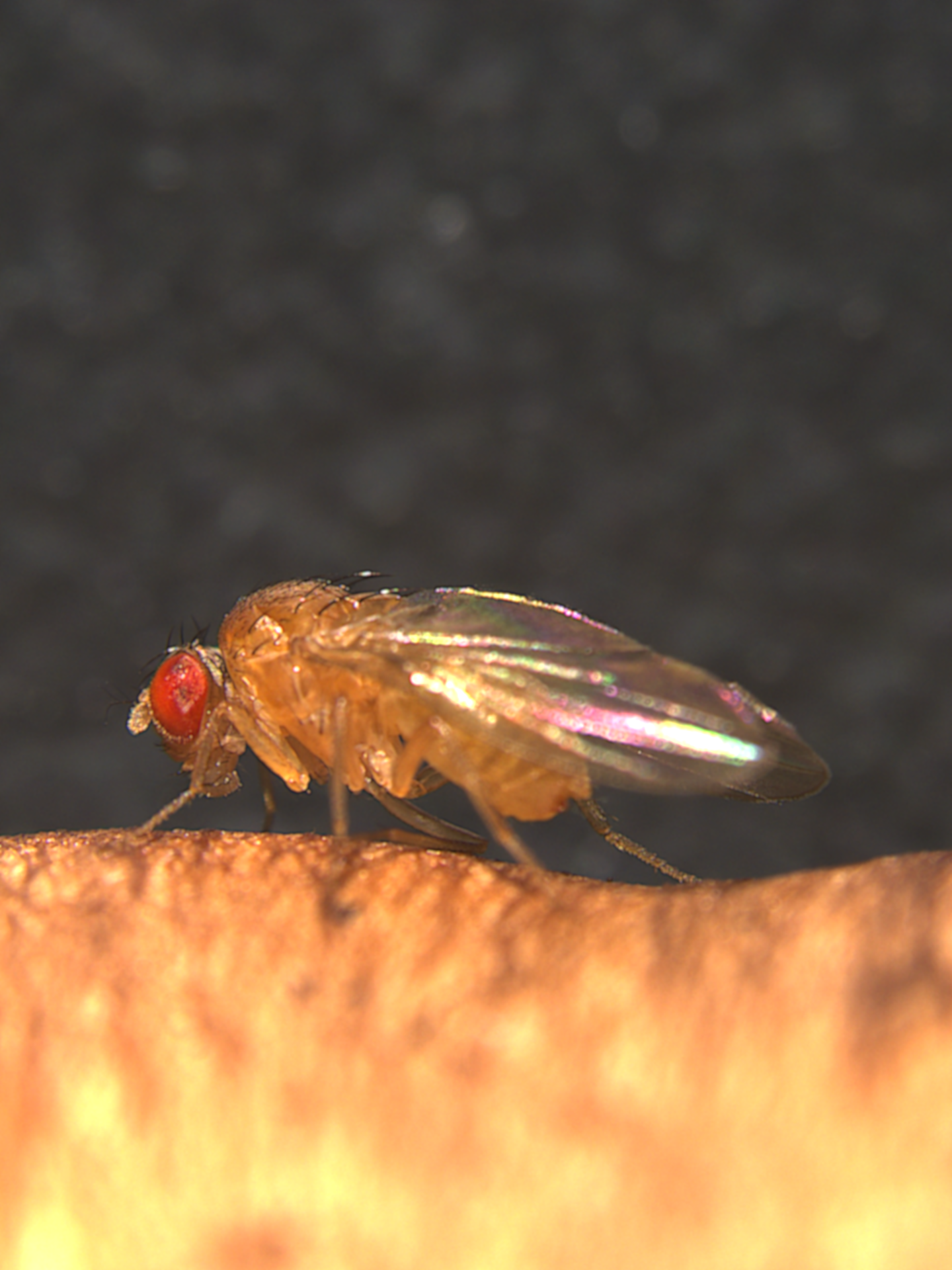
D. neotestacea (Testacea species group)
