= Jaenimonas drosophilae =

Scientific classification
- Domain: Eukaryota
- Clade: Discoba
- Phylum: Euglenozoa
- Class: Kinetoplastea
- Order: Trypanosomatida
- Family: Trypanosomatidae
- Genus: Jaenimonas
- Species: J. drosophilae

Binomial name
- Jaenimonas drosophilae Hamilton et al. (2015)

Species of protist

Jaenimonas drosophilae is a trypanosomatid parasite of mushroom-feeding flies, first characterized in Drosophila neotestacea and Drosophila falleni. Jaenimonas takes up residence in the gut of the fly, and infection leads to reduced fecundity of its fly host. The species is named for John Jaenike, a prominent ecologist and evolutionary biologist whose work on mushroom-feeding flies laid the foundation for studies on mycophagous Drosophila.

Of note, Jaenimonas is the only identified trypanosomatid parasite of a Drosophila species, and can facilitate study of insect-trypanosome infection dynamics; Drosophila have powerful genetic tools, and many trypanosomes are vectored by insects and are responsible for diseases such as African sleeping sickness, Chagas disease, and Leishmaniasis. Additionally, Crithidia trypanosomes are important parasites of Bumblebees implicated in colony collapse disorder.
