= Drosophila cardini species group =

Scientific classification
- Kingdom: Animalia
- Phylum: Arthropoda
- Class: Insecta
- Order: Diptera
- Family: Drosophilidae
- Genus: Drosophila
- Subgenus: Drosophila
- Species group: cardini

Species
- cardini subgroup; Drosophila acutilabella; Drosophila belladunni; Drosophila cardini; Drosophila cardinoides; Drosophila neocardini; Drosophila neomorpha; Drosophila parthenogenetica; Drosophila polymorpha; Drosophila procardinoides; dunni subgroup; Drosophila antillea; Drosophila arawakana; Drosophila caribiana; Drosophila dunni; Drosophila nigrodunni; Drosophila similis

Species group of the subgenus Drosophila

The Drosophila cardini species group belongs to the subgenus Drosophila of vinegar flies in the Immigrans-tripunctata radiation of the subgenus Drosophila. The closest relatives of Cardini species include Drosophila bizonata, Drosophila quinaria, and Drosophila testacea species groups, comprising mushroom-feeding flies. Cardini group species likely derived their more general feeding ecology from a mushroom-feeding ancestor, an evolutionary transition in feeding similar to Drosophila quinaria.
