= Jaenimonas =

Scientific classification
- Domain: Eukaryota
- Clade: Discoba
- Phylum: Euglenozoa
- Class: Kinetoplastea
- Order: Trypanosomatida
- Family: Trypanosomatidae
- Genus: Jaenimonas; Hamilton et al. (2015)

Species
- J. drosophilae Votypka & Hamilton 2015

Genus of parasitic flagellate protist in the Kinetoplastea class

Jaenimonas is a genus of trypanosomatid parasite that infects mushroom-feeding Drosophila, similar to Crithidia parasites of Bumblebees. Jaenimonas drosophilae is the sole representative of this genus. The genus is named in honor of John Jaenike, a prominent ecologist and evolutionary biologist whose work on mushroom-feeding flies laid the foundation for studies on mycophagous Drosophila. Jaenike was also an early proponent of the Red Queen hypothesis.
