= Drosophila albomicans =

Scientific classification
- Domain: Eukaryota
- Kingdom: Animalia
- Phylum: Arthropoda
- Class: Insecta
- Order: Diptera
- Family: Drosophilidae
- Genus: Drosophila
- Species: D. albomicans

Binomial name
- Drosophila albomicans Duda, 1923

Species of fly

Drosophila albomicans is a species of vinegar fly in the family Drosophilidae. Drosophila albomicans is a member of the Immigrans-tripunctata radiation of the subgenus Drosophila. The D. albomicans genome was first sequenced in 2012 to study the evolution of novel sex chromosomes, a characteristic this species is best known for. One commonly accepted definition of the biological species concept is that individuals or populations are members of different species if they are incapable of successful interbreeding. While D. albomicans and Drosophila nasuta are commonly referred to as distinct species, there appears to be little to no sexual isolation between these two Drosophila species. Instead, behavioural differences appear to reproductively isolate these two species.

The Immigrans species group (to which D. albomicans belongs) is related to the Drosophila quinaria and Drosophila testacea species groups. The related species Drosophila immigrans has been used in evolutionary studies to understand how viruses evolve with their hosts.
