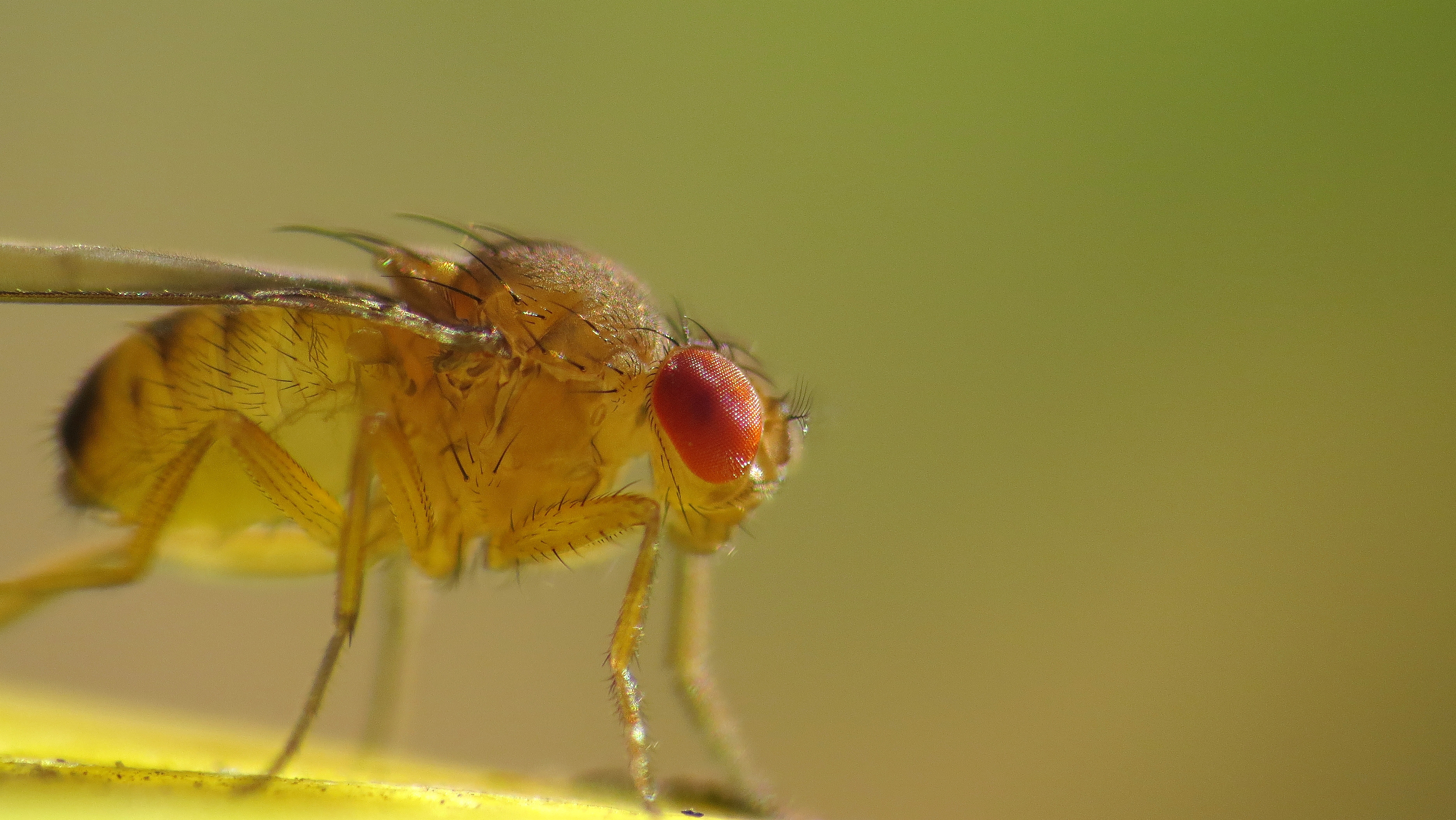
- Drosophila immigrans

Scientific classification
- Kingdom: Animalia
- Phylum: Arthropoda
- Class: Insecta
- Order: Diptera
- Family: Drosophilidae
- Genus: Drosophila
- Subgenus: Drosophila
- Species group: immigrans

Species subgroups
- curviceps; hypocausta; immigrans; nasuta; quadrilineata; Species: Drosophila trilimbata

= Drosophila immigrans species group =

Species group of the subgenus Drosophila

The Drosophila immigrans species group is a polyphyletic and speciose lineage of Drosophila flies, including over 100 species. Immigrans species belong to the Immigrans-tripunctata radiation of the subgenus Drosophila.

Well-described species include Drosophila immigrans, and the sister species Drosophila albomicans and Drosophila nasuta. The genome of D. albomicans was sequenced in 2012 in an effort to characterize novel sex chromosome development in D. albomicans.

Immigrans group species are related to mushroom-breeding Drosophila of the Quinaria and Testacea species groups.

== Subgroups ==
The Immigrans species group can be further divided into four subgroups:

- Immigrans subgroup: includes D. immigrans
- Nasuta subgroup: includes D. albomicans and D. nasuta
- Hypocausta subgroup
- Quadrilineata subgroup

The quadrilineata subgroup and D. sternopleuralis each branch away from the rest of the immigrans group on a phylogenomic analysis using 1000 orthologous loci.

== Notes ==
- Bachtrog and Vicoso. 2015. "Numerous Transitions of Sex Chromosomes in Diptera." PLoS Biology, 13(4), e1002078
- Katoh et al. 2007. "Phylogeny of the Drosophila immigrans Species Group (Diptera: Drosophilidae) Based on Adh and Gpdh Sequences." Zoolog Sci. 24(9):913-21.
