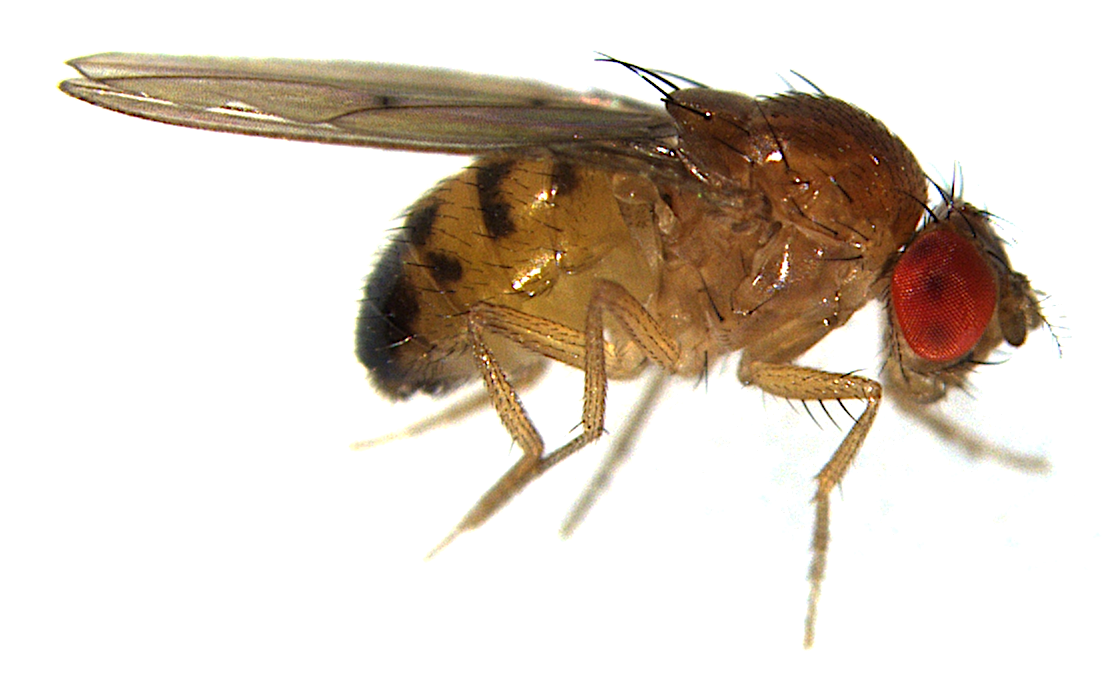

Scientific classification
- Kingdom: Animalia
- Phylum: Arthropoda
- Class: Insecta
- Order: Diptera
- Family: Drosophilidae
- Genus: Drosophila
- Subgenus: Drosophila
- Species group: quinaria
- Species: D. phalerata

Binomial name
- Drosophila phalerata Meigen, 1830

= Drosophila phalerata =

Species of fly

Drosophila phalerata is a species of mushroom-feeding fruit fly in the Drosophila quinaria species group. The genome of D. phalerata was sequenced in 2019 as part of a study on the evolution of immune systems, but was not assembled de novo.

Unlike its sister species D. innubila, the anterior and posterior costal wing veins of D. phalerata show prominent melanin deposition (see gallery below). Drosophila quinaria species group flies including the related D. guttifera display marked variation in their wing patterning, and melanin synthesis and deposition has been used as an obvious and malleable trait to study the regulation of gene expression.

== Gallery ==
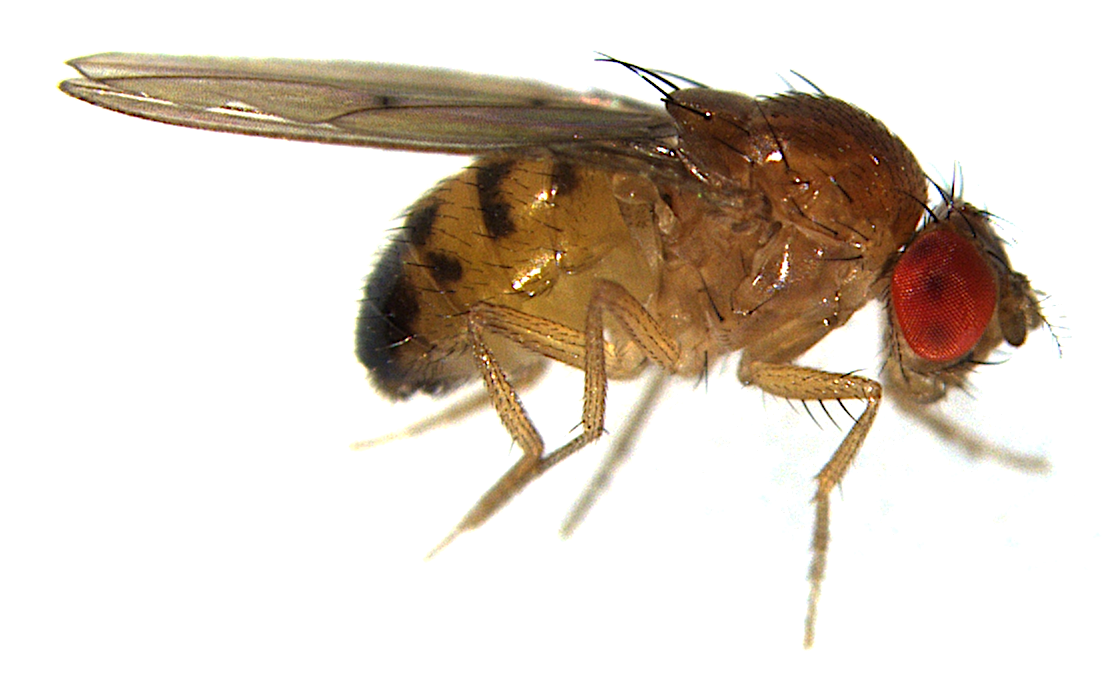
D. phalerata male

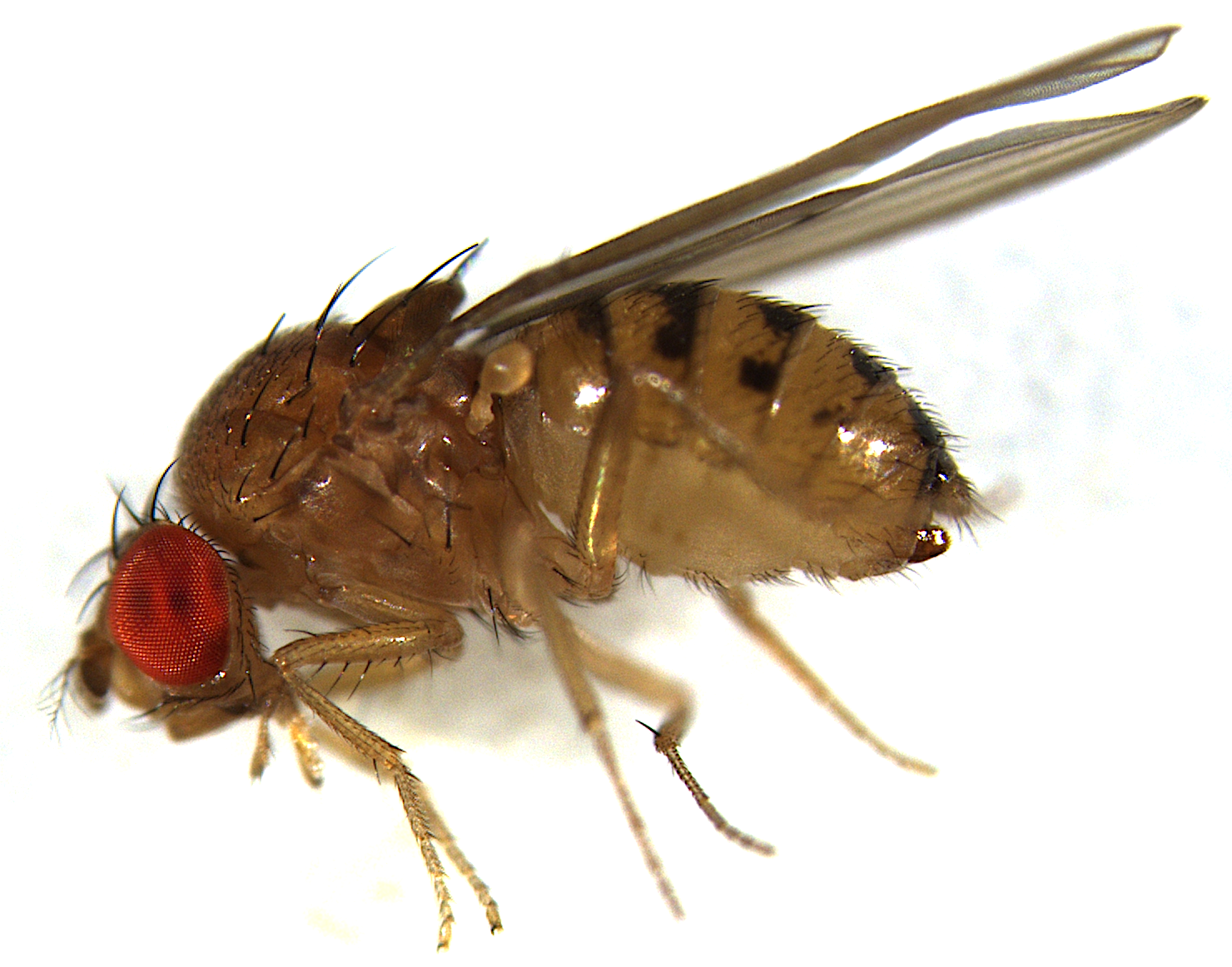
D. phalerata female

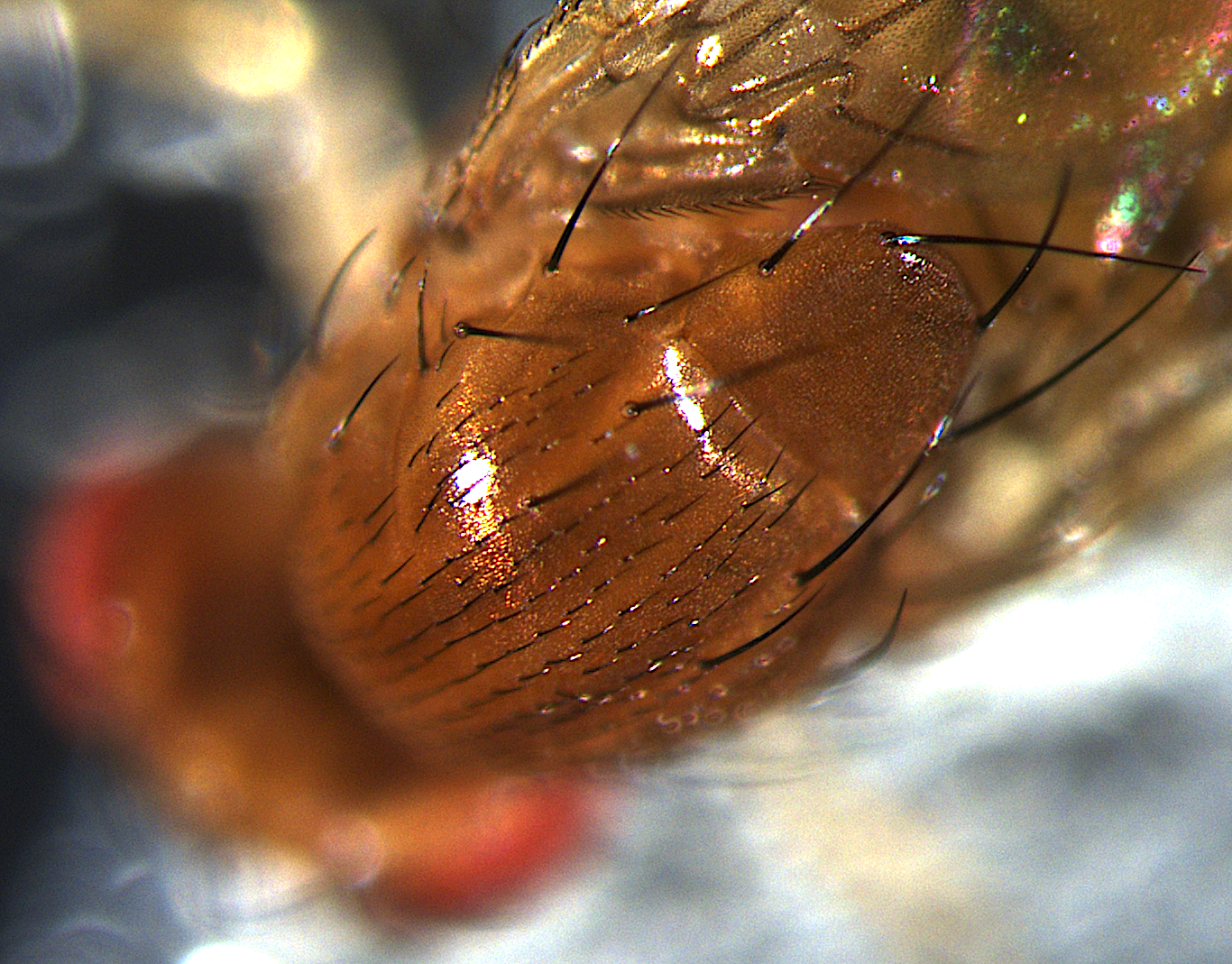
Image of dorsal setae of a D. phalerata female

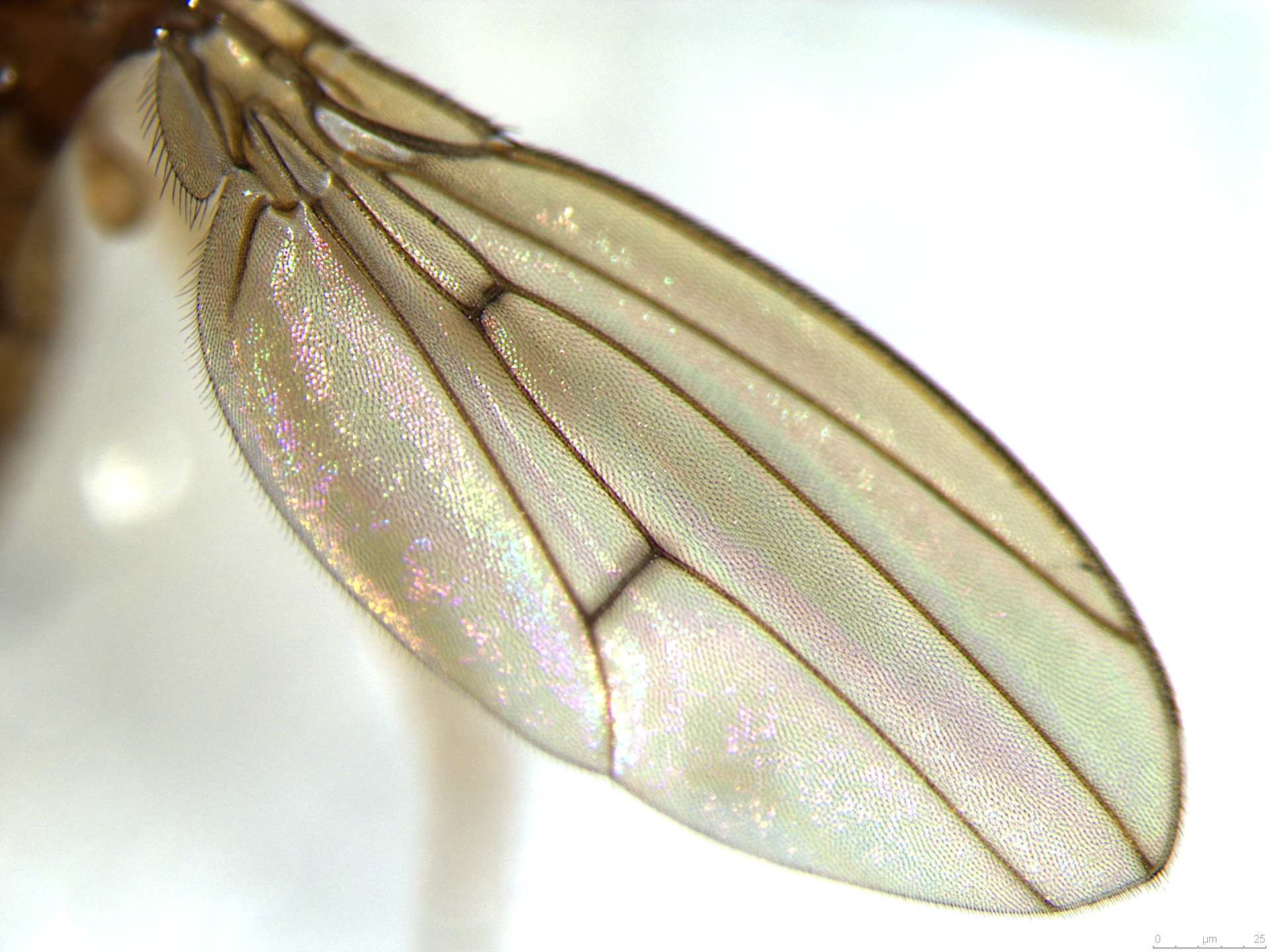
Image of melanin deposition along the anterior and posterior costal wing veins of a D. phalerata female

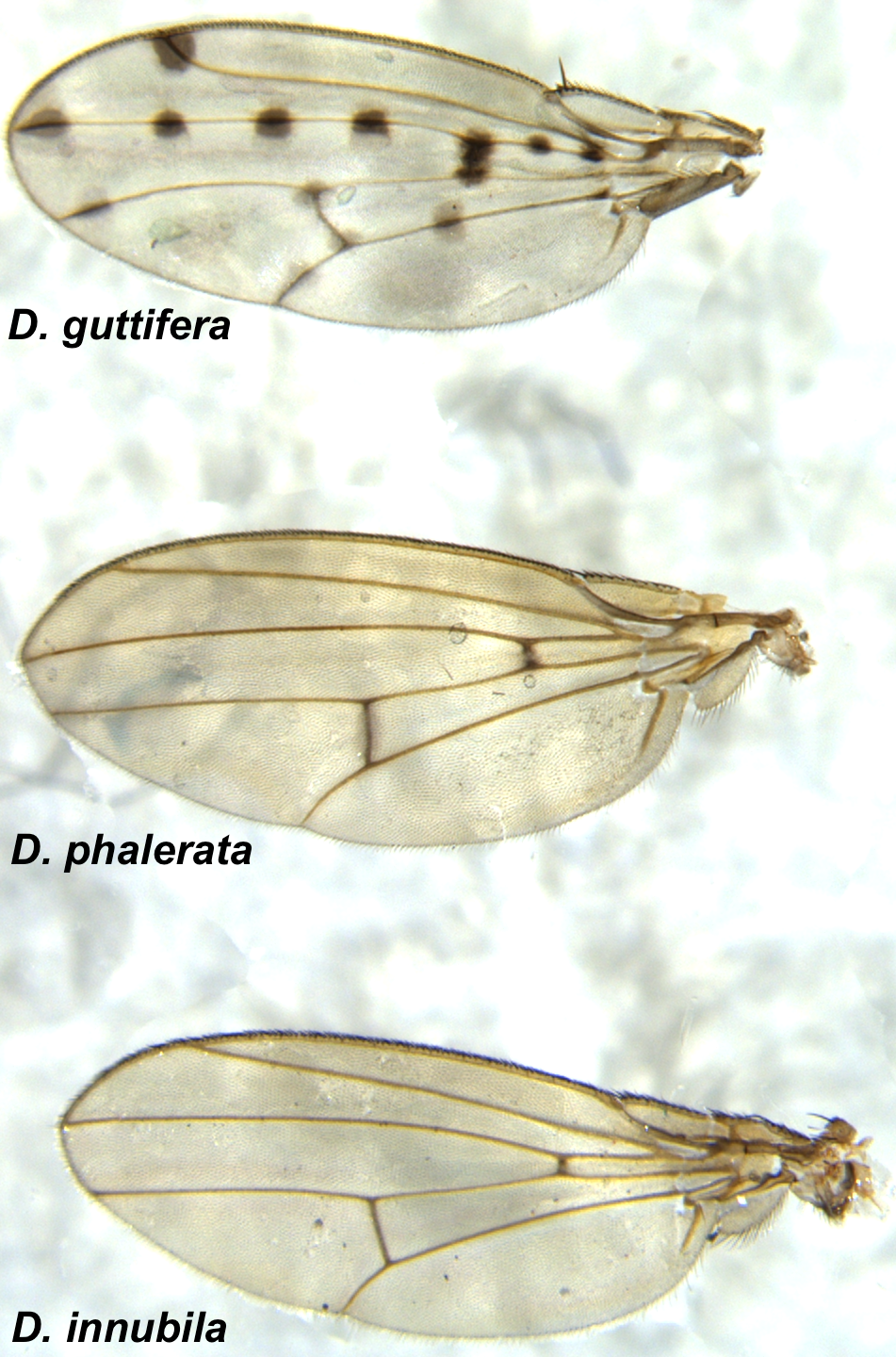
Wing vein and melanin deposition of Drosophila quinaria species group members
