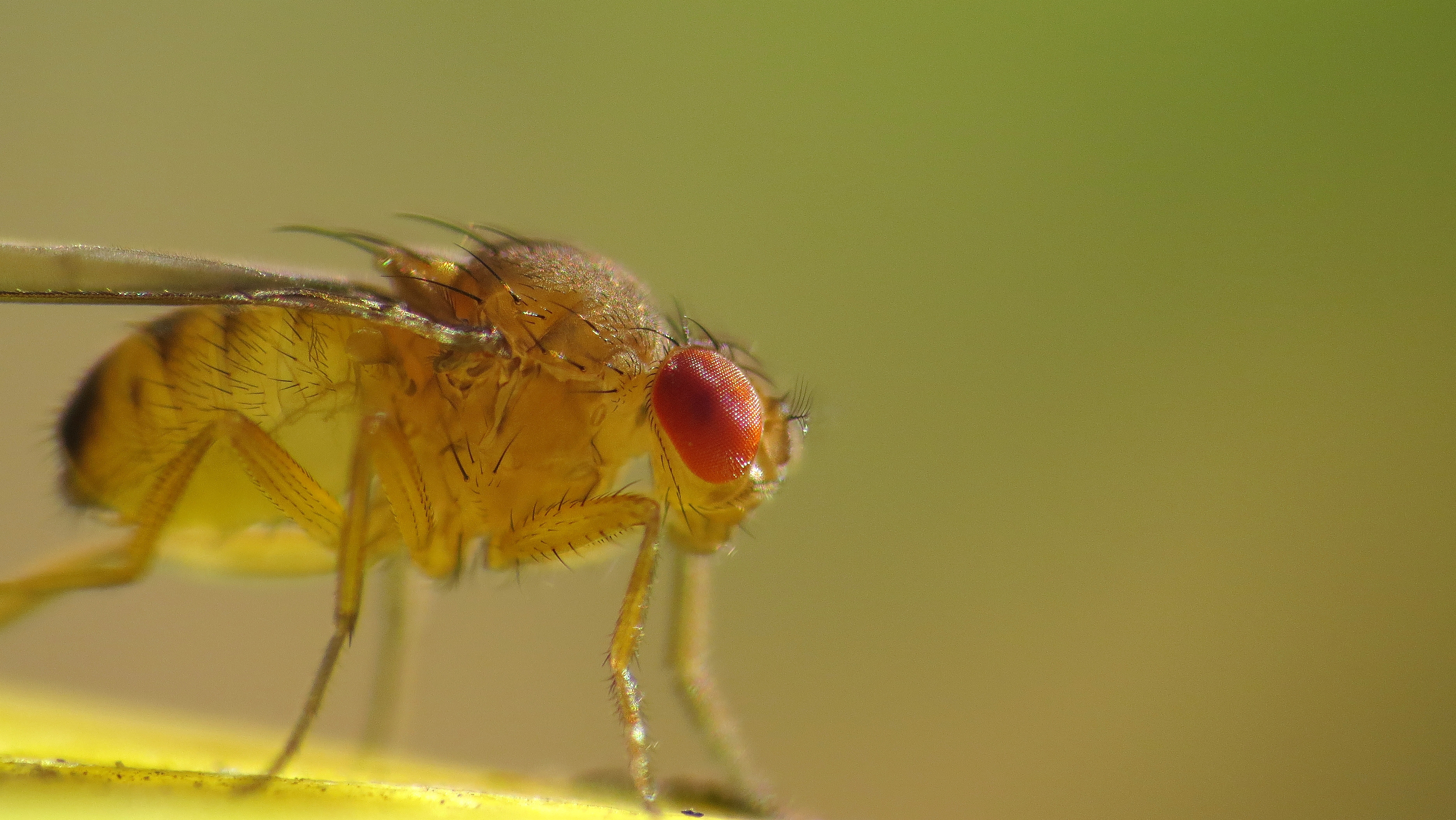
- Drosophila immigrans

Scientific classification
- Kingdom: Animalia
- Phylum: Arthropoda
- Class: Insecta
- Order: Diptera
- Family: Drosophilidae
- Genus: Drosophila
- Species: D. immigrans

Binomial name
- Drosophila immigrans Sturtevant, 1921

= Drosophila immigrans =

Species of fly

Drosophila immigrans is a species of vinegar fly in the family Drosophilidae. Drosophila immigrans is a member of the Immigrans-tripunctata radiation of the subgenus Drosophila. It is related to the Drosophila quinaria and Drosophila testacea species groups, and the fellow Immigrans species group member Drosophila albomicans. Drosophila immigrans has been used in evolutionary studies to understand how viruses evolve with their hosts.

== Gallery ==
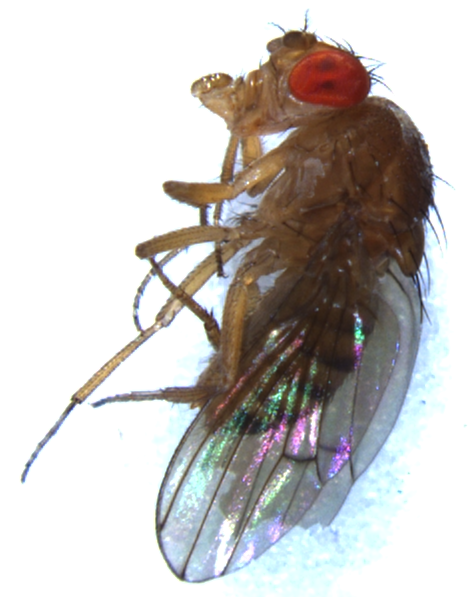

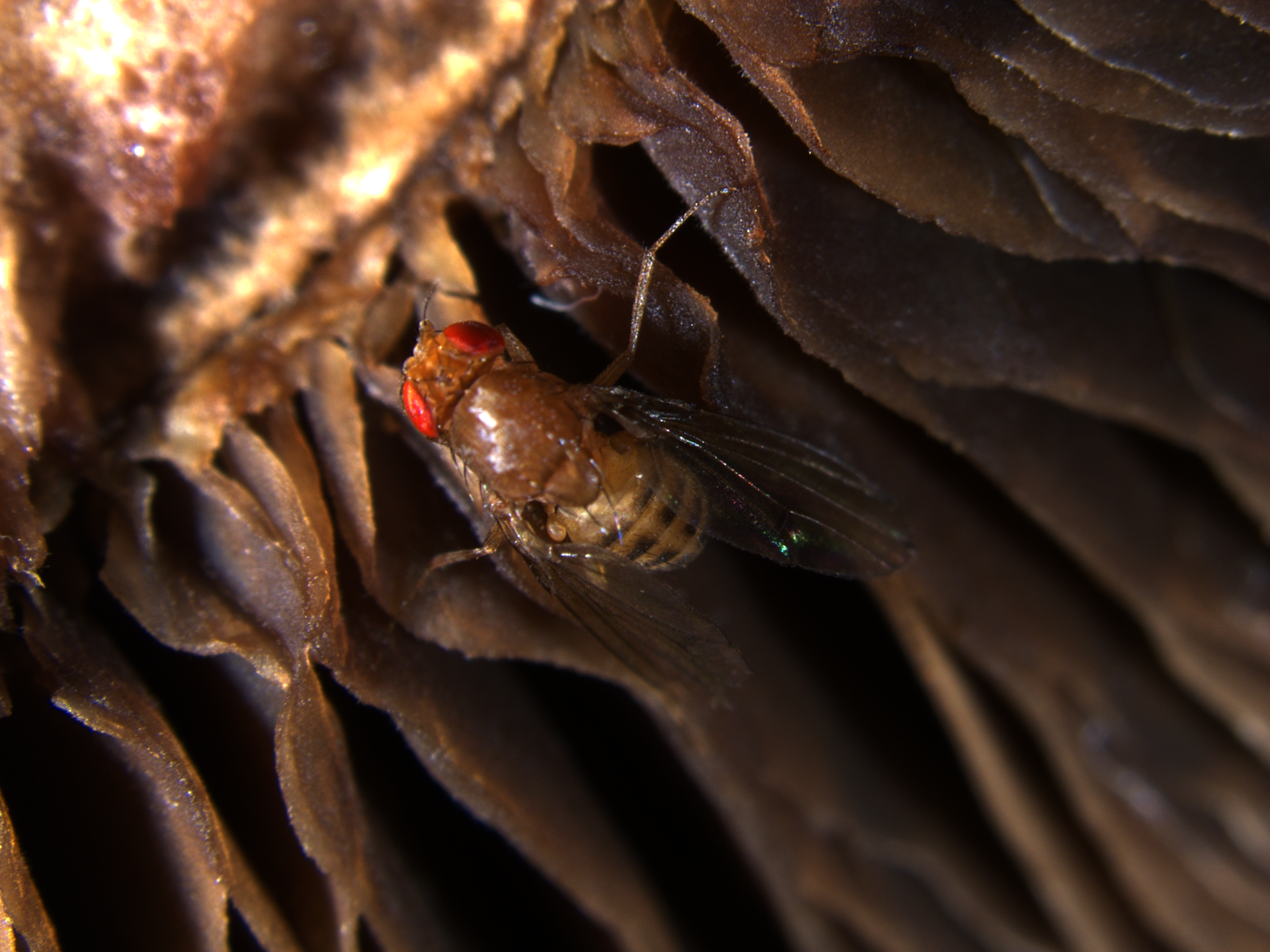

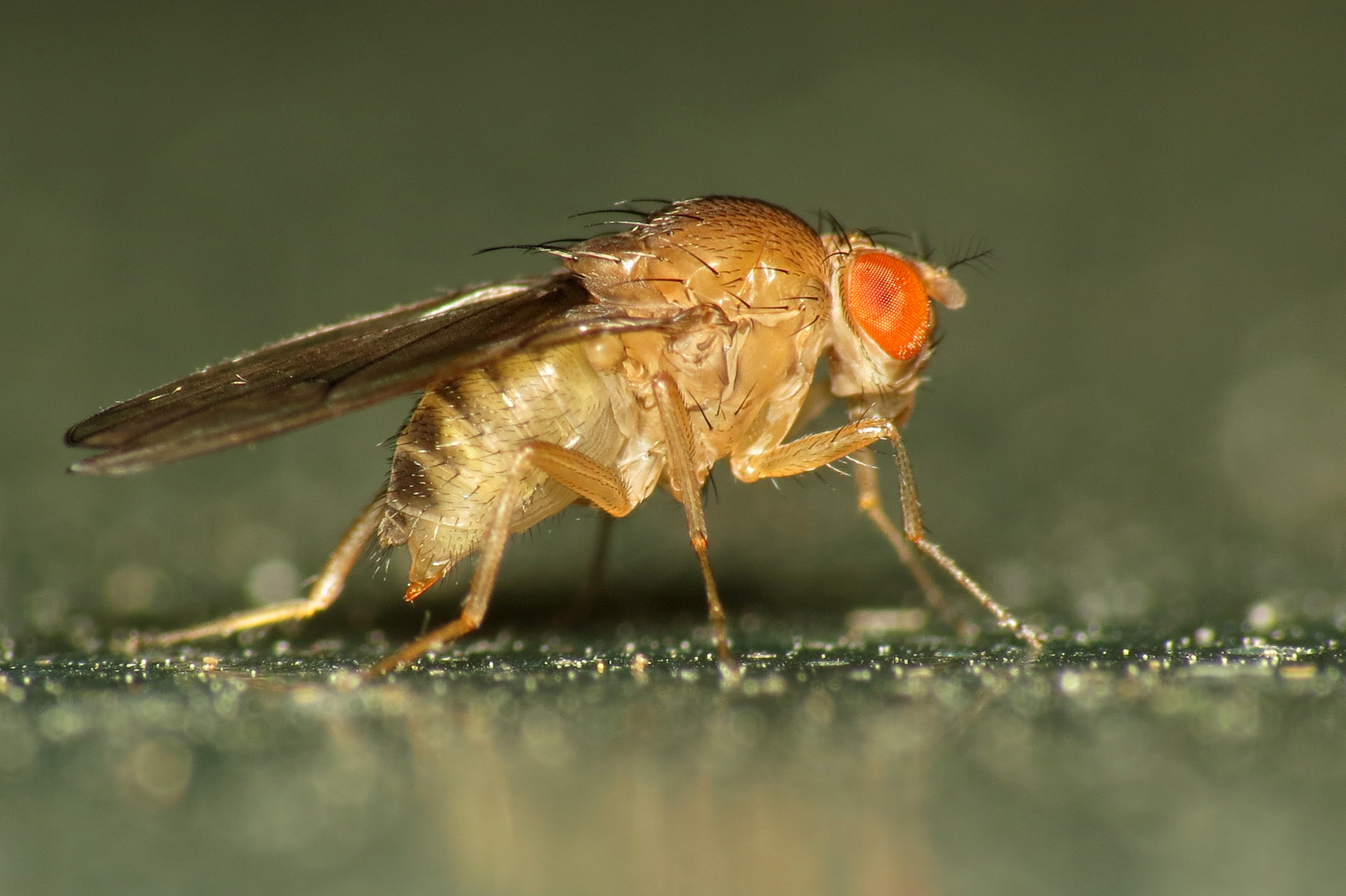

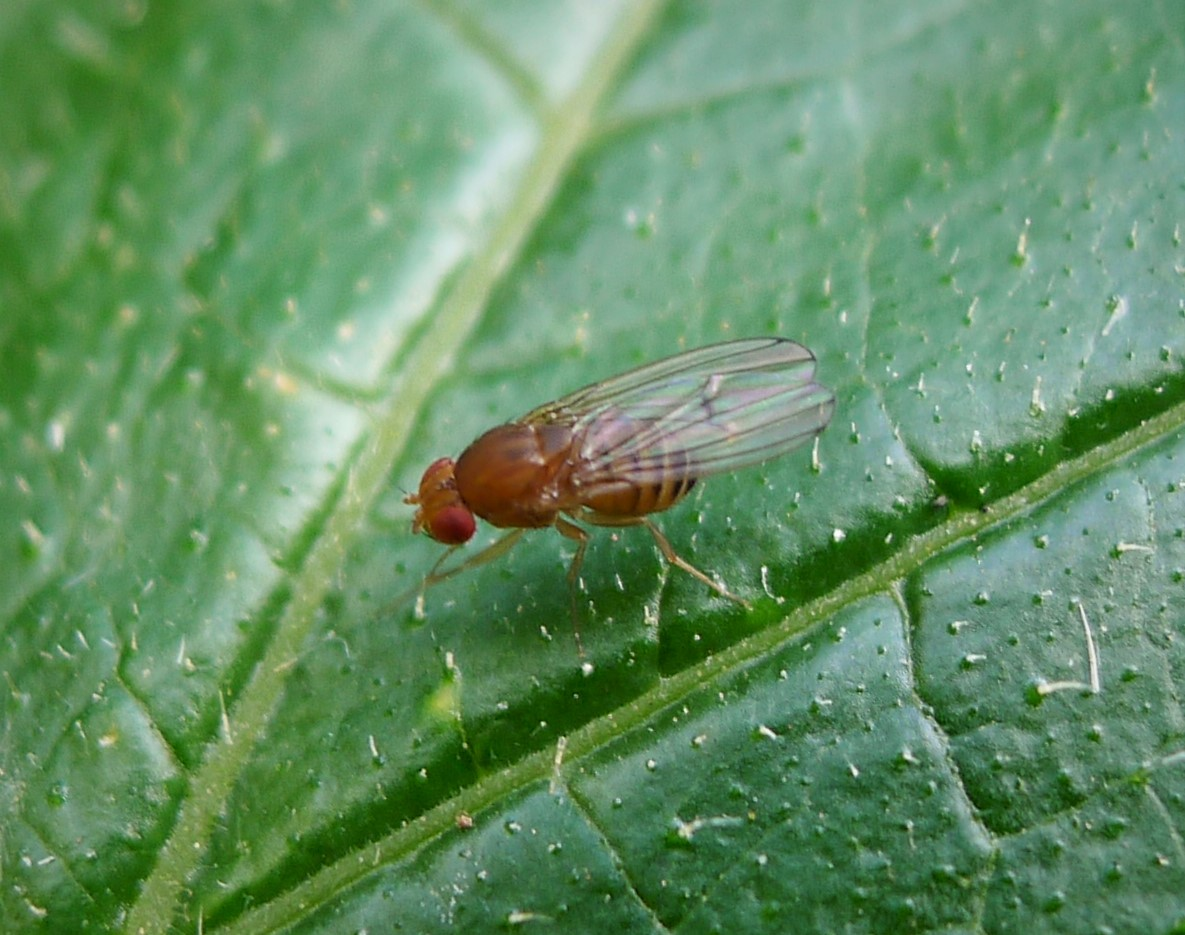
