= Drosophila tenebrosa =

Scientific classification
- Kingdom: Animalia
- Phylum: Arthropoda
- Class: Insecta
- Order: Diptera
- Family: Drosophilidae
- Genus: Drosophila
- Subgenus: Drosophila
- Species group: quinaria
- Species: D. tenebrosa

Binomial name
- Drosophila tenebrosa Spencer, 1943

Species of fly

Drosophila tenebrosa is a species of mushroom-feeding fruit fly in the Drosophila quinaria species group.
