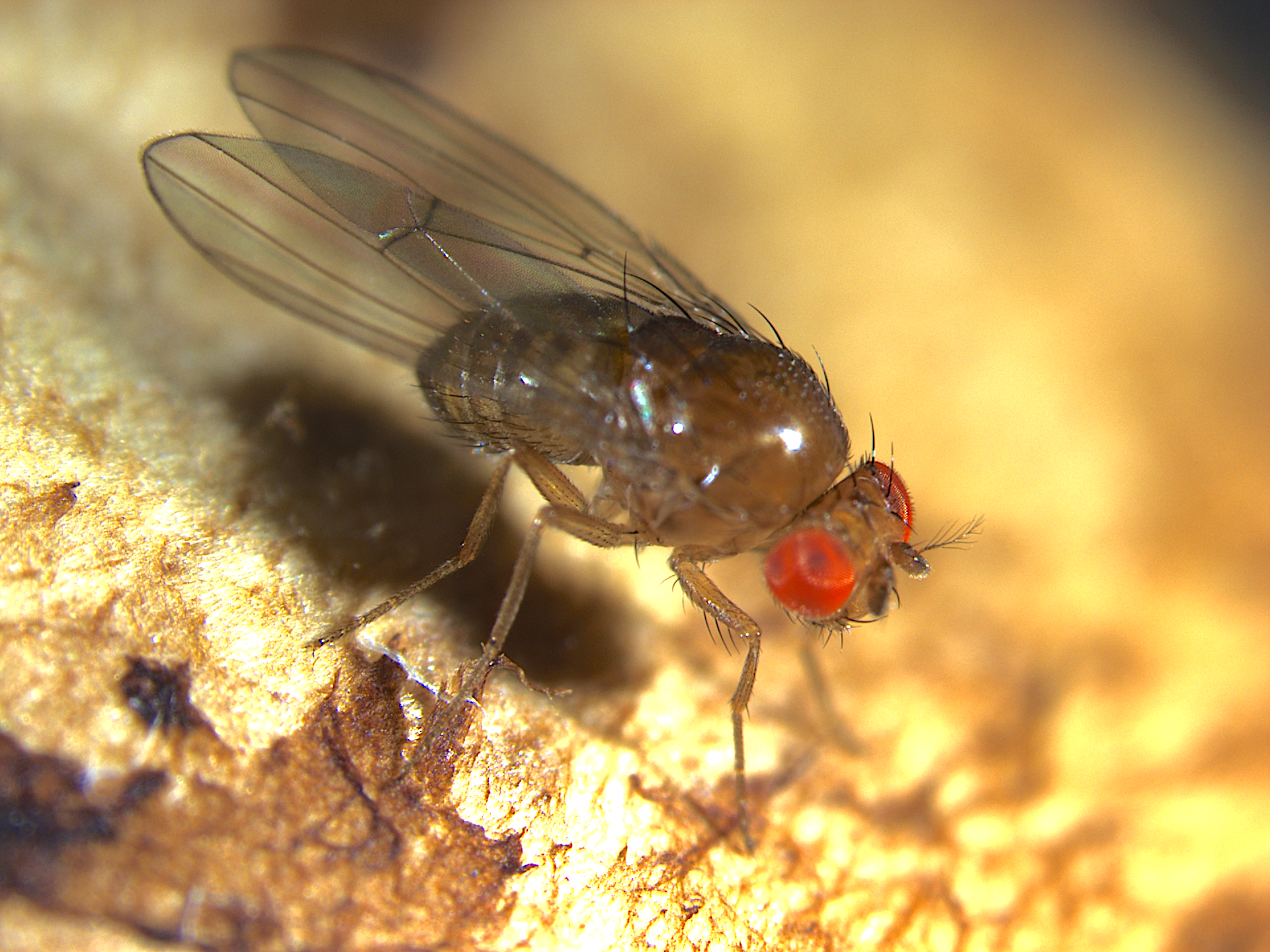
- Drosophila innubila

Scientific classification
- Kingdom: Animalia
- Phylum: Arthropoda
- Clade: Pancrustacea
- Class: Insecta
- Order: Diptera
- Family: Drosophilidae
- Subfamily: Drosophilinae
- Genus: Drosophila
- Subgenus: Drosophila
- Species group: quinaria

Species
- Drosophila angularis; Drosophila brachynephros; Drosophila deflecta; Drosophila curvispina; Drosophila falleni; Drosophila guttifera; Drosophila innubila; Drosophila kuntzei; Drosophila limbata; Drosophila munda; Drosophila nigromaculata; Drosophila occidentalis; Drosophila palustris; Drosophila phalerata; Drosophila quinaria; Drosophila recens; Drosophila rellima; Drosophila suboccidentalis; Drosophila subpalustris; Drosophila tenebrosa; Drosophila unispina; transversa complex; Drosophila magnaquinaria; Drosophila subquinaria; Drosophila transversa

= Drosophila quinaria species group =

Species group of the subgenus Drosophila

The Drosophila quinaria species group is a speciose lineage of mushroom-feeding flies studied for their specialist ecology, their parasites, population genetics, and the evolution of immune systems. Quinaria species are part of the Drosophila subgenus.

== Mushroom-feeding ecology ==
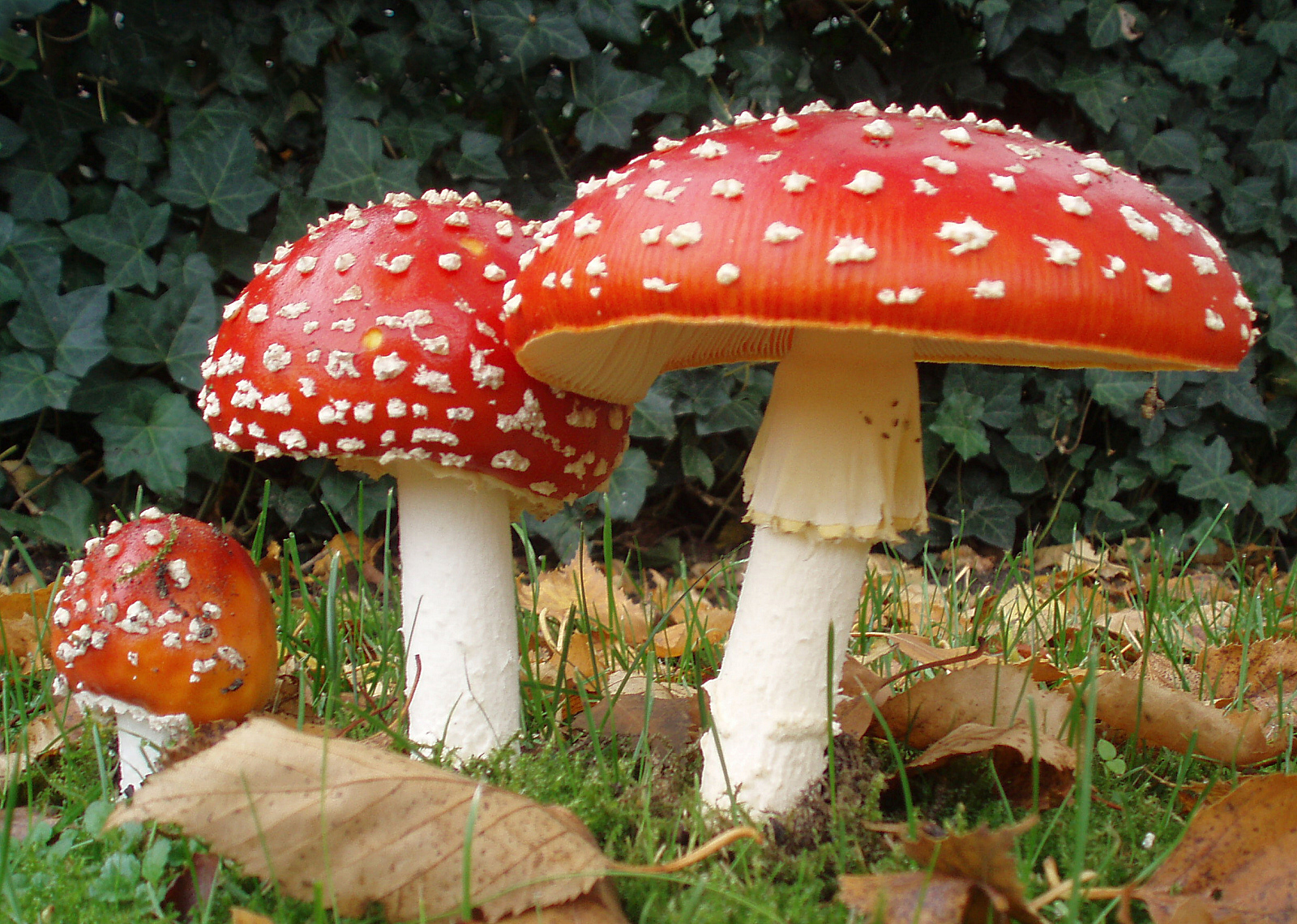
The fly agaric Amanita muscaria

Quinaria group species are commonly found on wild mushrooms, and can metabolize toxic compounds in Amanita mushrooms, such as ibotenic acid and alpha-amanitin. Mushroom sites also host a number of natural enemies. For instance, as a consequence of their mushroom-feeding ecology, Quinaria species are frequently infected by nematodes of the genus Howardula. Some Quinaria species are more or less susceptible to nematode parasitization, though the immunological reasons remain unclear. One possibility to explain this variance is differences in defensive bacterial symbionts. However another could be natural resource use, as most eukaryotes are unable to withstand the toxins in Amanita mushrooms, and thus development in these toxic mushrooms protects the flies from parasitism.

The ancestor of Quinaria species and related flies likely switched from a generalist ecology to become exclusively mushroom-feeders. From there, different mushroom-feeding lineages emerged, some of which reverted to feeding on decaying vegetation, such as Drosophila quinaria. Understanding the evolutionary forces that promoted a mushroom-feeding lifestyle, or reversion back to a more generalist ecology, can help understand concepts such as speciation and genetics of adaptation.

Quinaria group species such as Drosophila falleni are attracted to mushroom sites by cuing in on specific odourants that are common in rotting mushrooms, such as 1-pentanol, 1-octen-3-ol, and 3-methyl-1-butanol. Compared to Drosophila melanogaster, D. falleni are attracted to far more specific cues from rotting mushrooms. When D. falleni are infected by Howardula nematodes, infected flies become more averse to acetate-containing compounds such as ethyl acetate or propyl acetate. Conversely, infected flies become more attracted to 1-nonanol. This observation ties behavioural change to infection status, specifically identifying compounds that the fly becomes more or less averse to. Comparisons between mushroom-feeding Drosophila and D. melanogaster, and also between mushroom-specific Howardula parasitic nematodes and generalist nematodes could yield insight into how host-pathogen interactions alter olfactory preferences.

== Systematics ==
Evidence from phylogenetic studies suggests that the Quinaria group may be paraphyletic, comprising two clades. However, different phylogenetic analysis methods yield different results, so the exact systematics of the Quinaria group are still not fully confirmed.

=== Phylogeny ===
ASTRAL phylogenetic cladogram topology from Scott Chialvo and colleagues (2019).

- - Drosophila immigrans species group
- - - - - Drosophila tripunctata species group
        - - - Drosophila cardini species group
      - - Drosophila bizonata species group
        - - Drosophila testacea species group
    - - - Drosophila angularis
        - - Drosophila brachynephros
          - Drosophila phalerata
          - - Drosophila innubila
            - Drosophila falleni
  - - - - Drosophila nigromaculata
      - - - Drosophila magnaquinaria
          - Drosophila subpalustris
          - Drosophila palustris
          - Drosophila deflecta
          - Drosophila reflecta
        - - - Drosophila guttifera
            - Drosophila quinaria
            - - - Drosophila recens
                - Drosophila transversa
                - Drosophila subquinaria
              - - Drosophila munda
                - Drosophila tenebrosa
                - - Drosophila suboccidentalis
                  - Drosophila occidentalis

=== Related species ===
Quinaria species are related to the Drosophila cardini, Drosophila bizonata, and Drosophila testacea species groups. Evolutionary studies in these various mushroom-feeding Drosophila have contributed to understanding how symbiotic bacteria can drastically affect host evolution, the impact of various genetic elements in natural populations, and speciation.

== Genetics and genomics ==
Various Quinaria group species have contributed to genetic studies in different fashions. So far the genomes of four Quinaria species, D. guttifera, D. innubila, D. quinaria, and D. palustris have been sequenced. Additional sequence data has been generated for Drosophila falleni and Drosophila phalerata. The genome of D. innubila was sequenced for a study in 2019, and boasts a very complete assembly rivalling that of the classic genetic model Drosophila melanogaster. In September 2020, a study of Drosophila sex pheromone communication sequenced the genomes of D. quinaria, and D. palustris, as well as many outgroup lineages of the Quinaria species group.

=== Gene regulation on the fly ===
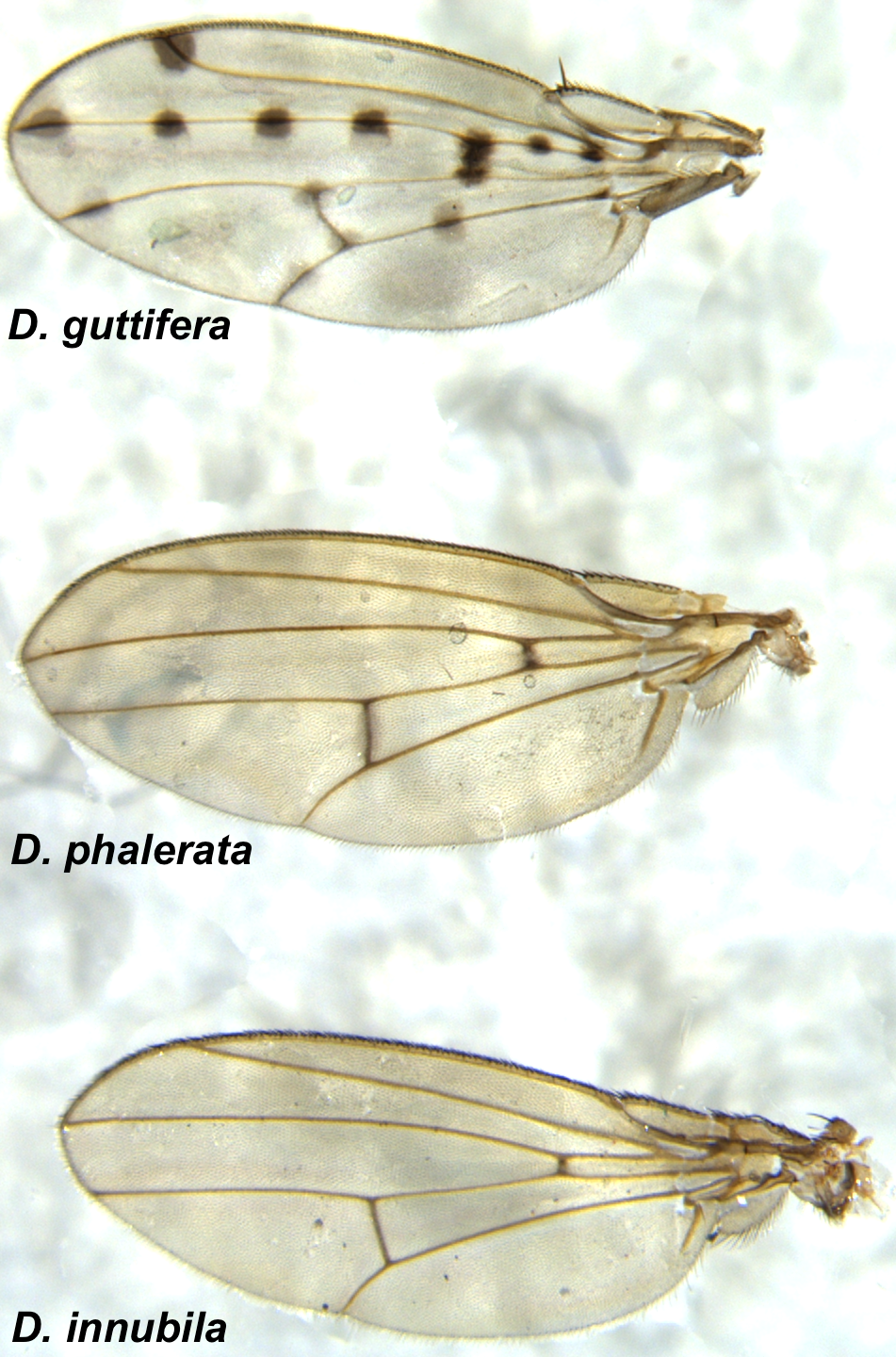
A comparison of wing patterns in Drosophila quinaria species

The patterning of Drosophila wings has long been of interest to evolutionary biologists as understanding the genetic changes underlying wing patterning helps understand how evolution can act to promote novel designs. Drosophila guttifera (the "Polka-dotted fruit fly") has conspicuous dot patterns on its wings made of black melanin. Different variations of these dot patterns occur in different Quinaria group species, ranging from only one melanin spot on the wing band at the anterior costal vein in D. innubila, to two wing band spots in D. phalerata, to conspicuous polka-dots in D. guttifera. One method to study these patterns has been to compare gene regulation amongst different Drosophila species. The Drosophila Wnt signalling pathway regulates wing development. In the Wnt pathway, the Wingless gene encodes a ligand involved in the local development of melanin synthesis in the wing. Other genes in the Wnt signalling pathway such as yellow and ebony are also involved in melanin regulation. Studies in the major genetic model organism Drosophila melanogaster are how the Wnt signalling pathway was first suspected. These studies implicated genes such as Wingless in wing development through mutations in Wnt signalling and the Wingless gene. Following this, studies in different species such as Drosophila biarmipes and Drosophila guttifera revealed different patterns of yellow gene expression. As a result of these comparative studies, and owing to its attractive wing patterning, D. guttifera is now used as a comparative model to understand gene network interactions amongst Wingless, yellow, and other Wnt signalling genes. Understanding how these networks cooperate to regulate wing patterning also helps scientists understand how gene regulatory networks work in other systems such as health or development. Using conspicuous patterns like polka dot distribution on wings makes understanding general principles of gene regulation more approachable.

In 2015, the genome of Drosophila guttifera was sequenced by the laboratory of Sean B. Carroll providing an answer on how different wing patterns emerge in this species. The authors found that additional copies of genetic switches called "enhancers" drives the polka-dot pattern on the wings of D. guttifera. These enhancers were a subset of cis-regulatory elements. As such, new evolutionary patterns can arise without modifying the active gene, by instead modifying existing enhancer regions. This leads to different patterns of gene expression, in the case of D. guttifera, resulting in different patterning on its wings.

=== Population genetics and speciation ===
Sympatric speciation, where reproductive isolation evolves within a population without the aid of geographic barriers.

Speciation describes when two populations diverge sufficiently such that they are considered different species, often because they can no longer successfully reproduce with one another. This process is intuitive for conspicuous examples such as ring species, wherein a population splits due to a geographical barrier such as a mountain range, leading to allopatric populations. However why species diverge when their geographic ranges overlap (sympatric speciation) is less understood.

The sister species Drosophila subquinaria and Drosophila recens overlap in geographic range and are capable of hybridization, meaning they can successfully reproduce with each other; however the offspring are very sickly. Thus, these two species are almost fully reproductively isolated, despite overlapping in geographic range. One reason for this is behavioural, driven by pheromones. D. subquinaria females readily avoid mating with males from other species, but surprisingly D. subquinaria females also avoid mating with males from the same species in allopatric populations. However D. recens females do not distinguish between males from different populations. Pheromones in the cuticle of the males differ between geographic ranges of D. subquinaria, possibly explaining how females distinguish males from different populations. The bacterial symbiont Wolbachia is common in populations of D. recens, and causes cytoplasmic incompatibility in crosses between D. recens males and D. subquinaria females. This has led to D. subquinaria females in sympatry with Wolbachia-infected D. recens to be more choosy when making a mate choice, while D. subquinaria females that are not sympatric with D. recens do not make this distinction.

The D. subquinaria species complex is made all the more challenging to interpret by continued gene flow between D. recens and D. subquinaria. Beyond these two species, Drosophila transversa is also capable of hybridization with both D. subquinaria and D. recens. Ginsberg and colleagues showed that the direction of gene flow is biased from D. recens into sympatric populations of D. subquinaria. This is likely due to increased one-directional mating success between D. recens females and D. subquinaria males in sympatry, but may also depend on the efficiency with which the D. recens X chromosome acts in a D. subquinaria genetic background.

There is also a sex ratio-distorting X chromosome in D. recens that may factor in to both speciation between D. recens and D. subquinaria, and selection on D. recens populations more generally. This selfish X chromosome is one of a number of selfish genetic elements in the Quinaria and Testacea Drosophila species groups. In D. recens, females with two copies of the selfish X are sterile, while males have reduced fertility. These deleterious effects are offset by the transmission advantage that the X chromosome has in males, where it kills off all Y-bearing sperm, leaving that male to sire only selfish X-bearing daughters, which in turn produce more sons that will again sire only daughters.

Much of the work characterizing subquinaria-recens speciation is built on a body of work initiated in the 1970s by John Jaenike and fellow researchers.

== Microbial symbiosis ==
Symbiosis refers to the interactions amongst living organisms. These interactions can range from parasitism to mutual benefit. Often whether something should be considered a parasite or a beneficial symbiont is context-dependent. For instance, reproductive manipulators like Spiroplasma bacteria can kill their hosts sperm to benefit the symbiont at the cost of the host. But these same bacteria can defend the host against immune challenge by parasites.

=== Endosymbionts ===
Bacterial endosymbionts are bacteria that live inside host compartments like inside host cells or in the blood. Endosymbionts are widespread in insects. The bacterial symbiont Wolbachia infects anywhere from 20 to 70% of all insects, while Spiroplasma is found in ~10% of Drosophila. These endosymbionts can have a number of different consequences from cytoplasmic incompatibility, male-killing, feminization, or defensive symbiosis.

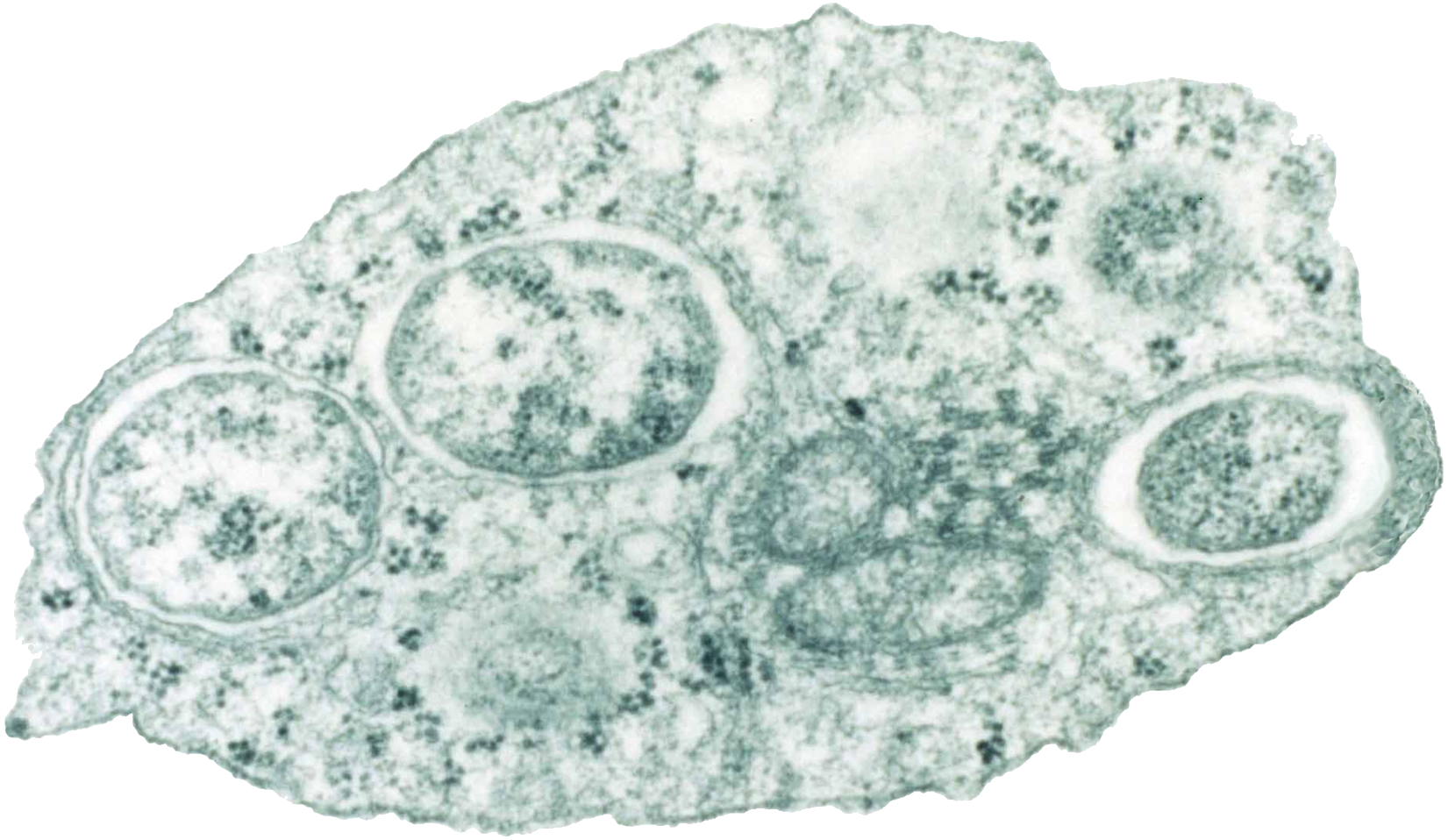
Transmission electron micrograph of Wolbachia bacteria in an insect cell.

==== Wolbachia ====
Wolbachia is the most widespread of bacterial endosymbionts in insects and arthropods. Wolbachia bacteria are distant relatives of mitochondria, and like mitochondria, live inside host cells. Also like mitochondria, Wolbachia are inherited through females, so sons and daughters inherit Wolbachia almost exclusively from their mothers. Wolbachia are also commonly referred to as reproductive parasites. In different insects and arthropods, Wolbachia manipulate host reproduction to increase the number of females in the population. This benefits the Wolbachia as they are passed on from mothers to their offspring.

Drosophila recens is commonly infected with a Wolbachia bacterial endosymbiont that causes cytoplasmic incompatibility. Females infected with this Wolbachia can readily mate with any male, regardless of the male's Wolbachia infection status. However uninfected females cannot mate with infected males. As such, Wolbachia infection in the population puts uninfected females at a mating disadvantage, as some proportion of their matings will not produce offspring. Moreover, the uninfected females invest resources into developing non-viable eggs, further reducing the reproductive fitness of uninfected females. Wolbachia from Drosophila capable of cytoplasmic incompatibility are being explored for their potential to introduce laboratory-reared organisms for biocontrol, such as mosquitoes that do not transmit dengue virus, the causative agent of dengue fever.

Drosophila innubila is a species commonly infected with a Wolbachia bacterial endosymbiont that causes male-killing. Male-killing results in the offspring of flies being entirely female, the biological sex with the higher reproductive output. Thus, while this reduces the number of viable eggs an infected female can produce, this Wolbachia spreads in the population owing to the increased reproductive output of females when compared to males. Female flies lay hundreds of eggs over their lifespan, and can store sperm in a specialized organ called the spermatheca. Thus, females do not need to mate repeatedly to successfully produce eggs. Meanwhile, males first have to successfully mate with a female, and then also win battles against other males through sperm competition, which is a prominent example of sexual selection.

Drosophila innubila is also commonly infected by the double-stranded DNA virus Drosophila innubila nudivirus (DiNV), the consequences of which are unknown. It has been shown that certain Wolbachia can protect their hosts against viral infection, even leading to biocontrol strategies that use Wolbachia infection to suppress the spread of viral diseases. What role (if any) Wolbachia plays in defence against DiNV is unclear.

==== Spiroplasma ====
Spiroplasma sp. are inherited bacterial symbionts that protect flies from parasites like wasps or nematodes. So far, Spiroplasma has been recovered from one Quinaria group species, Drosophila tenebrosa. While Spiroplasma of Drosophila flies typically derive from the poulsonii or citri clades, the Spiroplasma of D. tenebrosa is highly divergent and currently classified in its own clade. While Spiroplasma of Drosophila melanogaster can also exhibit male-killing, the D. tenebrosa Spiroplasma did not. It is possible that this Spiroplasma defends D. tenebrosa against parasites, as horizontal gene transfer of defensive genes amongst Spiroplasmas of mushroom-feeding flies has been observed, even amongst different Spiroplasma clades that infect very different groups of flies.

=== The gut microbiome ===
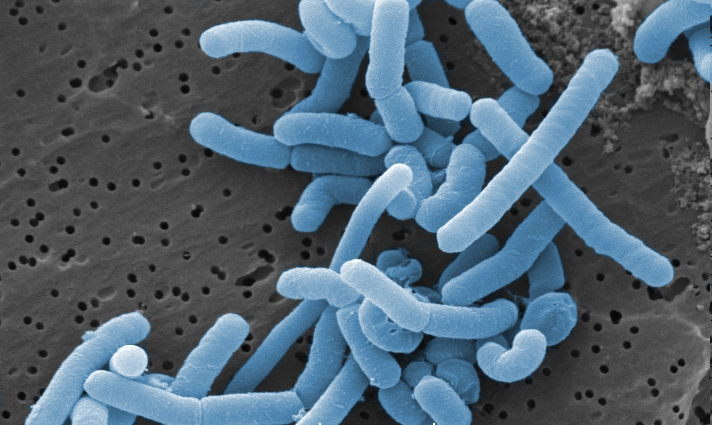
Colorized electron micrograph of a probiotic Lactobacillus species

How animals select and shape their microbiota is of great interest to a number of research fields, particularly for the implications on human and animal health. As a powerful model organism for genetics, the gut microbiome of D. melanogaster has been researched extensively. Common species in this microbiome include Lactobacillus plantarum and Acetobacter species, which are highly beneficial for the fly's development.

No bacterial species are common amongst 100% of Drosophila species though a few species are present in many of the gut microbiomes of Drosophila screened so far. While most Quinaria species feed on rotting mushrooms rife with bacteria, the gut microbiome of these mushroom-feeding flies differs drastically in composition from the bacterial communities on the mushrooms they visit. This suggests the host fly can selectively incorporate beneficial bacteria into its gut microbiome, and reject non-beneficial bacteria. The mechanism behind how mushroom-feeding flies can selectively maintain their gut microbiota despite feeding on rotting mushroom is still unclear. Comparisons between the associations of other Drosophila and Quinaria group species may yield insight into both the host and bacterial mechanisms necessary for establishing a stable bacterial community.

== Immunity ==
Mushroom-feeding Drosophila are commonly infested by nematodes and parasitic wasps. These pose important challenges for the host immune system with significant impacts on fitness and fertility.

=== Parasitic infection ===
Dissected Drosophila falleni infected with Howardula aoronymphium nematodes

Many Quinaria group species are infected by parasitic nematodes of the genus Howardula, especially Howardula aoronymphium. Infection by these nematodes can sterilize flies, or alter their olfactory preferences. Some Quinaria group species are more or less susceptible to different nematode parasites. For instance, D. falleni and D. neotestacea are sterilized by Howardula aoronymphium nematodes, while related species resist infection. This sterilization is associated with reduced expression of genes involved in egg development, and increases in cuticle synthesis pathways. Mushroom-feeding Drosophila are used as a model for understanding the genetic basis of nematode susceptibility or resistance, which may lead to a better understanding of how the innate immune system responds to nematode parasites. Of note, while Drosophila melanogaster has an extremely well-characterized immune system and boasts powerful genetic tools, no nematode parasite naturally infects D. melanogaster. This has hampered the use of Drosophila as a model for interactions between nematodes and the innate immune system.

Mushroom-feeding Drosophila are also frequently parasitized by parasitoid wasps such as Leptopilina sp.. These wasps infest the fly larva by inserting their ovipositor into the larva and depositing an egg internally. The wasp larvae hatch within the host, and remain relatively benign until fly pupation. This is because the wasp larva requires the fly larva to develop to the point of pupation so the wasp itself can metamorphose within the puparium in place of the fly. This process ultimately kills the fly, which is devoured by the developing wasp. Parasitic wasps also frequently inject toxins or even virus-like particles alongside their eggs that suppress the host immune response to increase the success of the wasp larva. In response, the fly immune system attempts to encapsulate invading wasp larva and attacks them using the insect melanization response. In D. melanogaster, specialized blood cells called lamellocytes that regulate local melanin synthesis during capsule formation. However these blood cells are absent in other Drosophila species. Despite this, these other Drosophila can nonetheless suppress wasp development through unknown immune mechanisms, though susceptibility varies by species of fly and species of wasp. In some species, the bacterial symbiont Spiroplasma protects related mushroom-feeding Drosophila from wasp parasitization using toxins that selectively kill the wasp larva but not the host fly, an interaction well-characterized using comparisons between Spiroplasma from D. melanogaster and the mushroom-feeding Drosophila neotestacea.

Different mite parasites are also common at mushroom sites. Mites are external parasites that latch onto the fly abdomen and feed on the hemolymph. Mite bites or parasitic wasp stings are a natural mechanism to introduce infections. They may also serve as a mechanism to introduce and distribute bacterial endosymbionts between different fly species.

=== Immune response ===
The genome of D. innubila was sequenced in 2019, and highlighted the importance of the interaction between D. innubila and its viruses as implied by patterns of immune evolution in antiviral genes. Notably, natural selection on the immunity and antiviral pathways in D. innubila differ markedly from D. melanogaster, implying divergent evolutionary pressures. The D. innubila DNA nudivirus (DiNV) is similar to the D. melanogaster Kallithea virus. As such, comparisons between D. melanogaster and D. innubila and their viruses promise to inform on the nature of host-virus interactions.

The antimicrobial peptide gene Diptericin B has been pseudogenized in two independent lineages of mushroom-feeding fruit flies: the Quinaria group species Drosophila guttifera and the more distantly related Drosophila neotestacea. Diptericin B is conserved in all other Drosophila species, yet these two pseudogenization events in mushroom-breeding flies were independent, suggesting Diptericin B is actively lost in these species. However Diptericin B is retained in Drosophila innubila, and remains transcriptionally active. It also seems that unrelated Tephritid fruit flies have independently derived a Diptericin gene strikingly similar to the Drosophila Diptericin B gene. These evolutionary patterns in mushroom-breeding Drosophila and other fruit flies suggests that the immune system's effectors (like antimicrobial peptides) are directly shaped by host ecology.

Diptericins are important immune molecules in defence against Providencia bacteria, and Diptericin B has also been shown to affect memory formation in Drosophila melanogaster. The loss of Diptericin B in these mushroom-breeding flies implies that this immune molecule is unimportant for the ecology of mushroom-feeding flies, but somehow important for other fruit flies in the genus Drosophila.

== See also ==
- Drosophila neotestacea
- Howardula aoronymphium
- Spiroplasma bacteria
