= Drosophila deflecta =

Scientific classification
- Kingdom: Animalia
- Phylum: Arthropoda
- Class: Insecta
- Order: Diptera
- Family: Drosophilidae
- Genus: Drosophila
- Subgenus: Drosophila
- Species group: quinaria
- Species: D. deflecta

Binomial name
- Drosophila deflecta Malloch & Mcatee, 1924

Species of fly

Drosophila deflecta is a species of fruit fly in the Drosophila quinaria species group. Larvae are scavengers of Nuphar water lilies.
