= Drosophila angularis =

Scientific classification
- Kingdom: Animalia
- Phylum: Arthropoda
- Clade: Pancrustacea
- Class: Insecta
- Order: Diptera
- Family: Drosophilidae
- Genus: Drosophila
- Subgenus: Drosophila
- Species group: quinaria
- Species: D. angularis

Binomial name
- Drosophila angularis Okada, 1956

Species of fly

Drosophila angularis is a species of fruit fly in the Drosophilidae family, which was first described in 1956 by the Japanese entomologist, Toyohi Okada. The fly is part of the Drosophila quinaria species group.

It is found on mushrooms.

It is found in Japan, Korea, and Russia.
