= Drosophila guarani species group =

Scientific classification
- Kingdom: Animalia
- Phylum: Arthropoda
- Class: Insecta
- Order: Diptera
- Family: Drosophilidae
- Genus: Drosophila
- Subgenus: Drosophila
- Species group: Drosophila guarani species group

Species
- See text

Species group of the subgenus Drosophila

The Drosophila guarani species group is a lineage of vinegar fly in the Immigrans-tripunctata radiation of the subgenus Drosophila first proposed by Dobzhansky & Pavan (1943). At least 24 species have been described, distributed throughout Latin America.

== Disambiguation ==
The species group has been referred to as "Drosophila guarnini."
