= Drosophila calloptera =

Scientific classification
- Domain: Eukaryota
- Kingdom: Animalia
- Phylum: Arthropoda
- Class: Insecta
- Order: Diptera
- Family: Drosophilidae
- Genus: Drosophila
- Species: D. calloptera

Binomial name
- Drosophila calloptera Schiner, 1868

Species of vinegar fly

Drosophila calloptera is a species of vinegar fly in the Immigrans-tripunctata radiation of the subgenus Drosophila.
