= Drosophila acutilabella =

Scientific classification
- Kingdom: Animalia
- Phylum: Arthropoda
- Class: Insecta
- Order: Diptera
- Family: Drosophilidae
- Genus: Drosophila
- Subgenus: Drosophila
- Species group: cardini
- Species: D. acutilabella

Binomial name
- Drosophila acutilabella Stalker, 1953

Species of fly

Drosophila acutilabella is a Neotropical species of fly in the genus Drosophila.
