= John Jaenike =

J. Jaenike
- Born: John Jaenike; 20 March 1949
- Education: Princeton University
- Known for: Red Queen hypothesis, mushroom-feeding Drosophila
- Awards: The trypanosomatid parasite Jaenimonas drosophilae is named in Jaenike's honor
- Scientific career
- Fields: Ecology, Evolutionary biology
- Workplaces: University of Arizona, University of Rochester
- Academic advisors: Henry S. Horn; Robert H. MacArthur

John Jaenike is an ecologist and evolutionary biologist, and currently a professor at the University of Rochester New York. Jaenike was an early proponent of the Red Queen hypothesis, using the idea to explain the maintenance of sex. Jaenike is also known for his extensive work on mushroom-feeding Drosophila and the evolution of their inherited bacterial symbionts Wolbachia and Spiroplasma poulsonii.

In 2015, the trypanosomatid parasite Jaenimonas drosophilae was named in Jaenike's honour.

== See also ==
- Drosophila quinaria species group
- Mushroom-feeding Drosophila
