= Drosophila tripunctata =

Scientific classification
- Domain: Eukaryota
- Kingdom: Animalia
- Phylum: Arthropoda
- Class: Insecta
- Order: Diptera
- Family: Drosophilidae
- Genus: Drosophila
- Species: D. tripunctata

Binomial name
- Drosophila tripunctata Loew, 1862

Synonyms
- Drosophila modesta Sturtevant, 1916

Species of fly

Drosophila tripunctata is a species of vinegar fly in the Immigrans-tripunctata radiation of the subgenus Drosophila.
