= Drosophila quinaria =

Scientific classification
- Kingdom: Animalia
- Phylum: Arthropoda
- Class: Insecta
- Order: Diptera
- Family: Drosophilidae
- Genus: Drosophila
- Subgenus: Drosophila
- Species group: quinaria
- Species: D. quinaria

Binomial name
- Drosophila quinaria Loew, 1866

Species of fly

Drosophila quinaria is a species of fruit fly in the Drosophila quinaria species group. Most Quinaria group species feed largely on mushrooms. However D. quinaria instead eats decaying vegetative matter, a trait it evolved independently.
