= Drosophila bizonata species group =

Scientific classification
- Kingdom: Animalia
- Phylum: Arthropoda
- Class: Insecta
- Order: Diptera
- Family: Drosophilidae
- Genus: Drosophila
- Subgenus: Drosophila
- Species group: bizonata

Species
- Drosophila bizonata

Species group of fruit flies

The Drosophila bizonata species group is a species group of fruit flies in the subgenus Drosophila.
