= Mushroom-feeding Drosophila =

Species group of the subgenus Drosophila

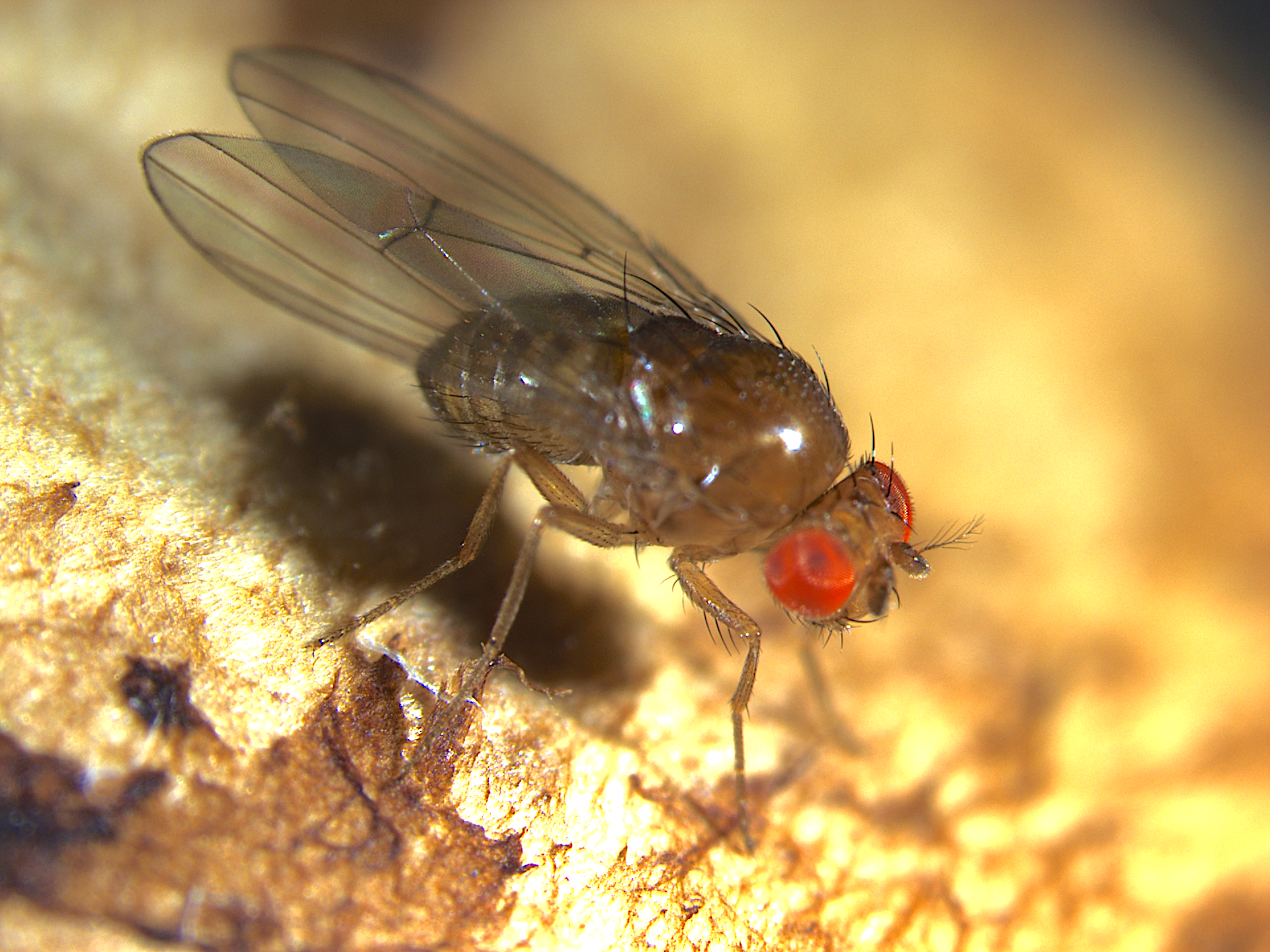
Drosophila innubila, a mycophagous Drosophila, on a mushroom

Mushroom-feeding Drosophila (mycophagous Drosophila) are a subset of Drosophila flies that have highly specific mushroom-breeding ecologies. Often these flies can tolerate toxic compounds from Amanita mushrooms.

== Species groups ==
- Drosophila testacea species group
- Drosophila quinaria species group
- Drosophila bizonata species group
- Some members of the Drosophila obscura species group

=== Sequenced genomes or transcriptomes ===
- Drosophila guttifera
- Drosophila neotestacea
- Drosophila innubila
- Drosophila falleni
- Drosophila phalerata

== Gallery ==
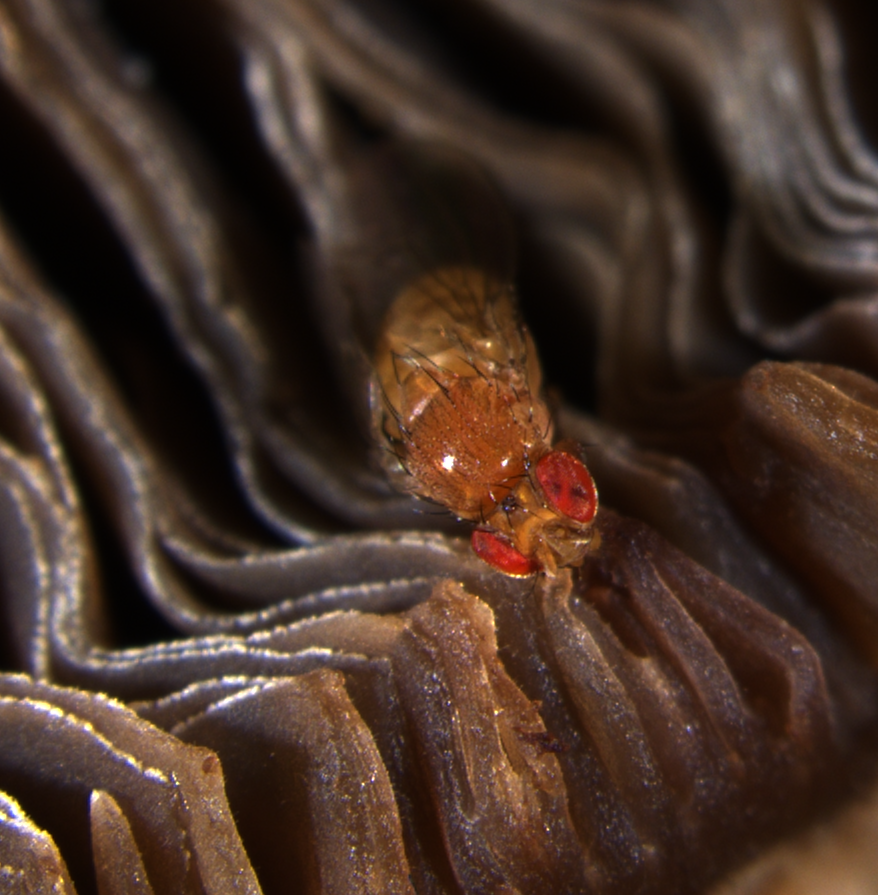
D. neotestacea (Testacea species group)

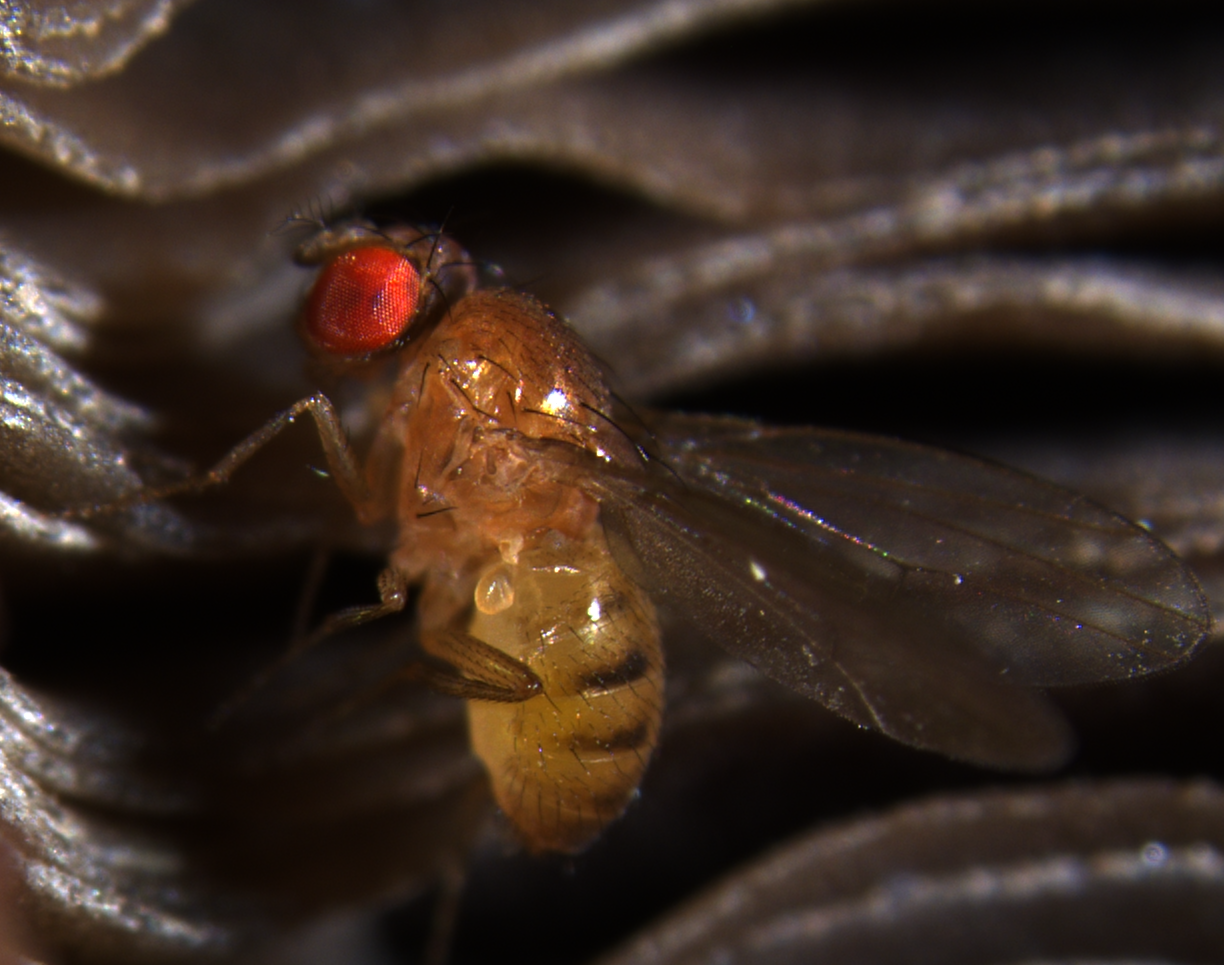
D. testacea (Testacea species group)

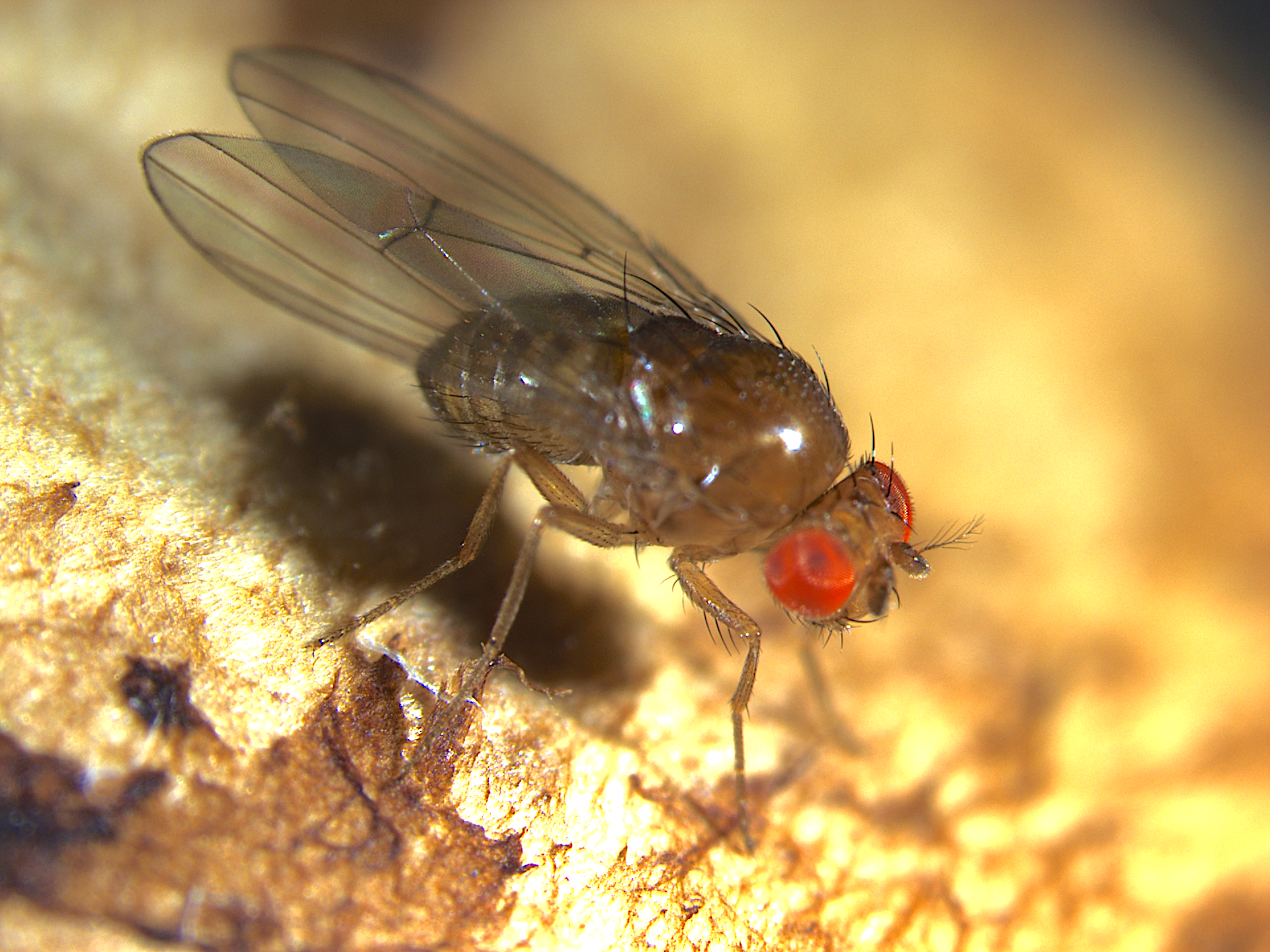
D. innubila (Quinaria species group)

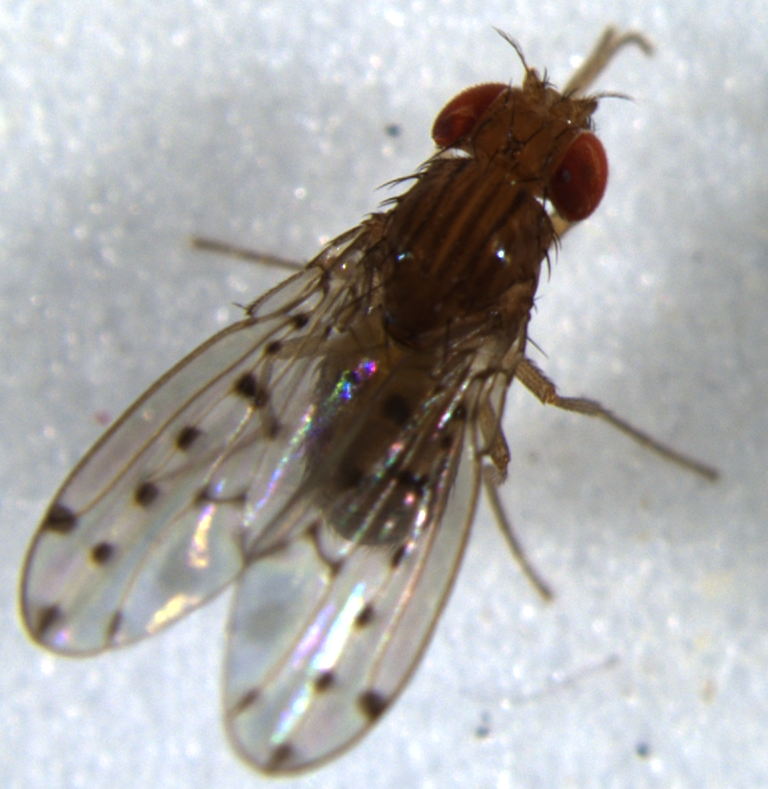
Drosophila guttifera (Quinaria species group)

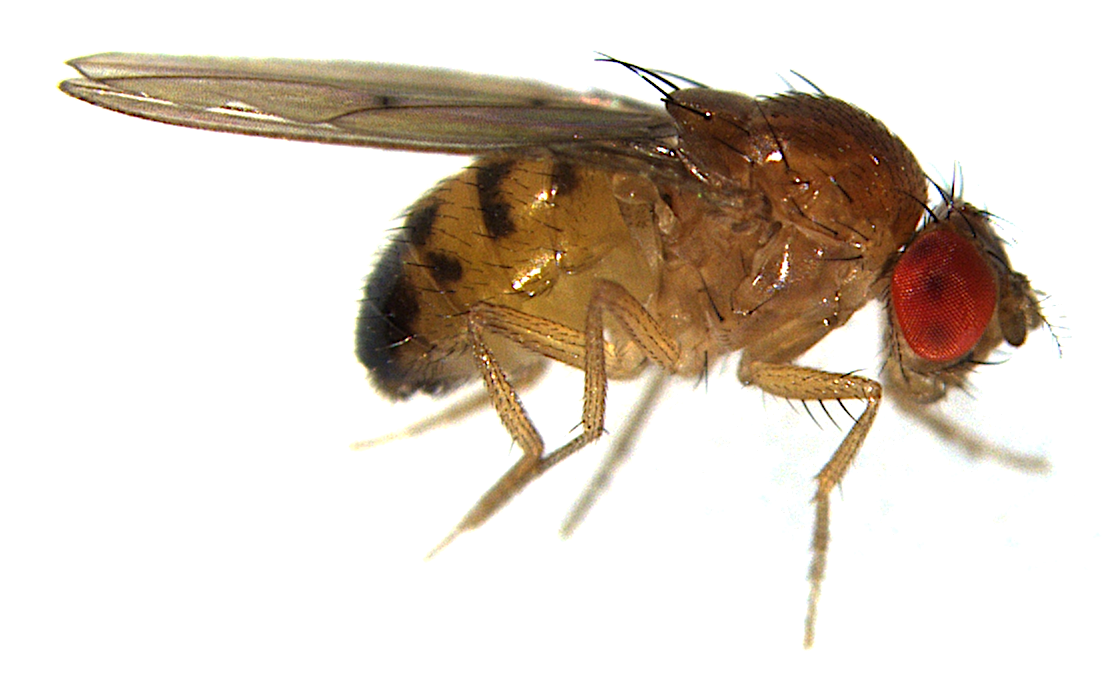
Drosophila phalerata (Quinaria species group)

A dissected Drosophila falleni (Quinaria species group) infected with Howardula aoronymphium nematodes
