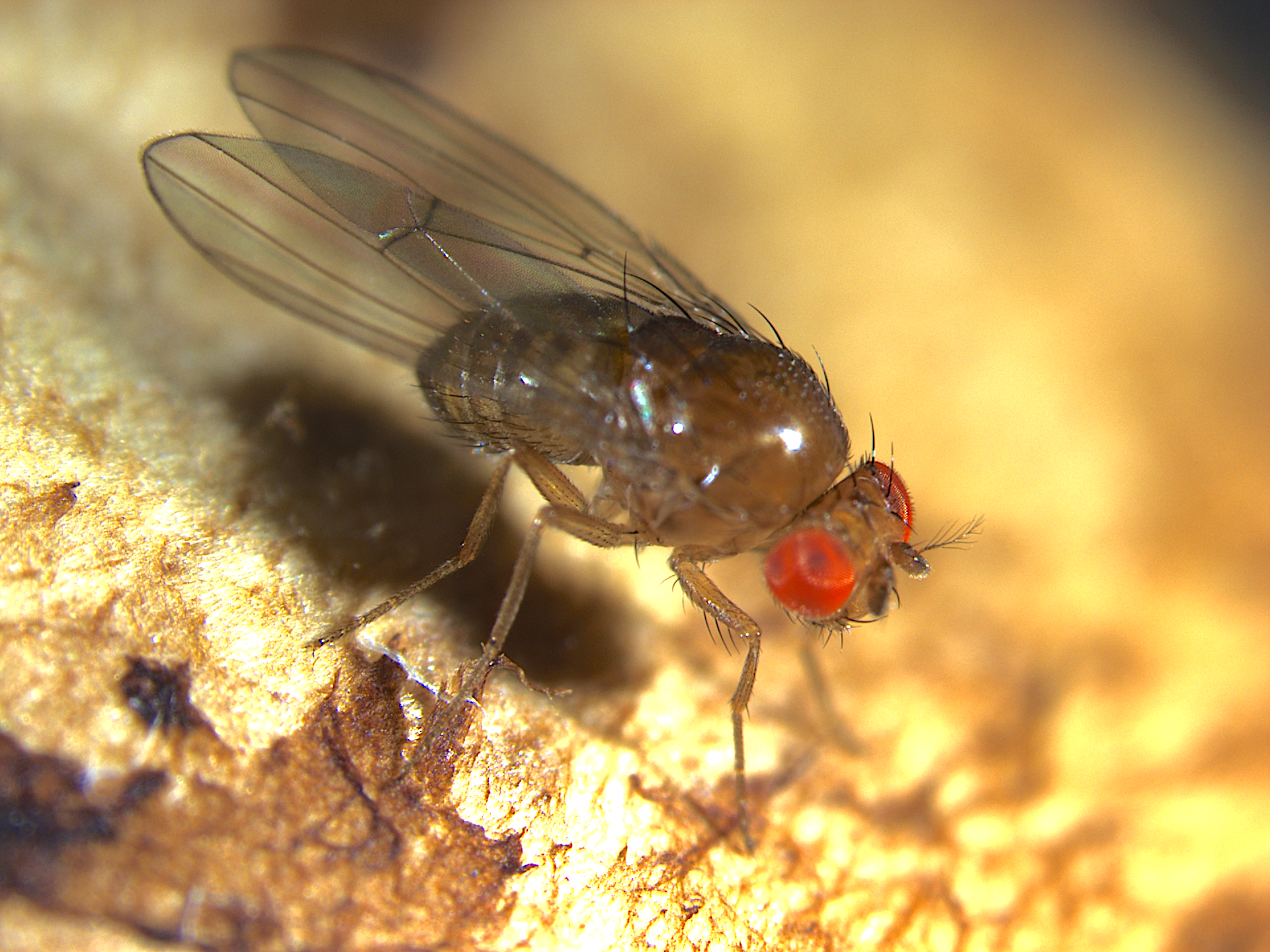
- A Drosophila innubila female on mushroom

Scientific classification
- Kingdom: Animalia
- Phylum: Arthropoda
- Clade: Pancrustacea
- Class: Insecta
- Order: Diptera
- Family: Drosophilidae
- Genus: Drosophila
- Subgenus: Drosophila
- Species group: quinaria
- Species: D. innubila

Binomial name
- Drosophila innubila Spencer in Patterson, 1943

= Drosophila innubila =

Species of fly

Drosophila innubila is a species of vinegar fly restricted to high-elevation woodlands in the mountains of the southern USA and Mexico, which it likely colonized during the last glacial period. Drosophila innubila is a kind of mushroom-breeding Drosophila, and member of the Drosophila quinaria species group. Drosophila innubila is best known for its association with a strain of male-killing Wolbachia bacteria. These bacteria are parasitic, as they drain resources from the host and cause half the infected female's eggs to abort. However Wolbachia may offer benefits to the fly's fitness in certain circumstances. The D. innubila genome was sequenced in 2019.

== Symbiosis ==
Drosophila innubila is stably infected by a strain of male-killing Wolbachia bacteria. The association between Drosophila innubila and Wolbachia can vary greatly within local populations. However, their relationship is very consistent across the overall Drosophila innubila species.

Male-killing by these Wolbachia results in the offspring of flies being entirely female, the biological sex with the higher reproductive output. Thus, this Wolbachia spreads in the population owing to the increased reproductive advantage of females it infects. However bacterial density varies over development. Bacterial density is lowest in the embryo and increases over the lifespan of the fly, reaching its highest densities in the ovaries of females. Bacterial density directly affects the efficiency of Wolbachia inheritance, as females with lower Wolbachia density also produce daughters with a low bacterial density. The forces driving differences in bacterial density may be epigenetic. If bacterial densities are low enough, females begin to produce males in spite of being infected with male-killing Wolbachia. There is no evidence that a Wolbachia infection can be transmitted horizontally from an infected female fly to an uninfected female fly. Unlike extracellular symbiotic bacteria (e.g. Spiroplasma), Wolbachia live inside their host cells, which likely reduces its ability to move between hosts.

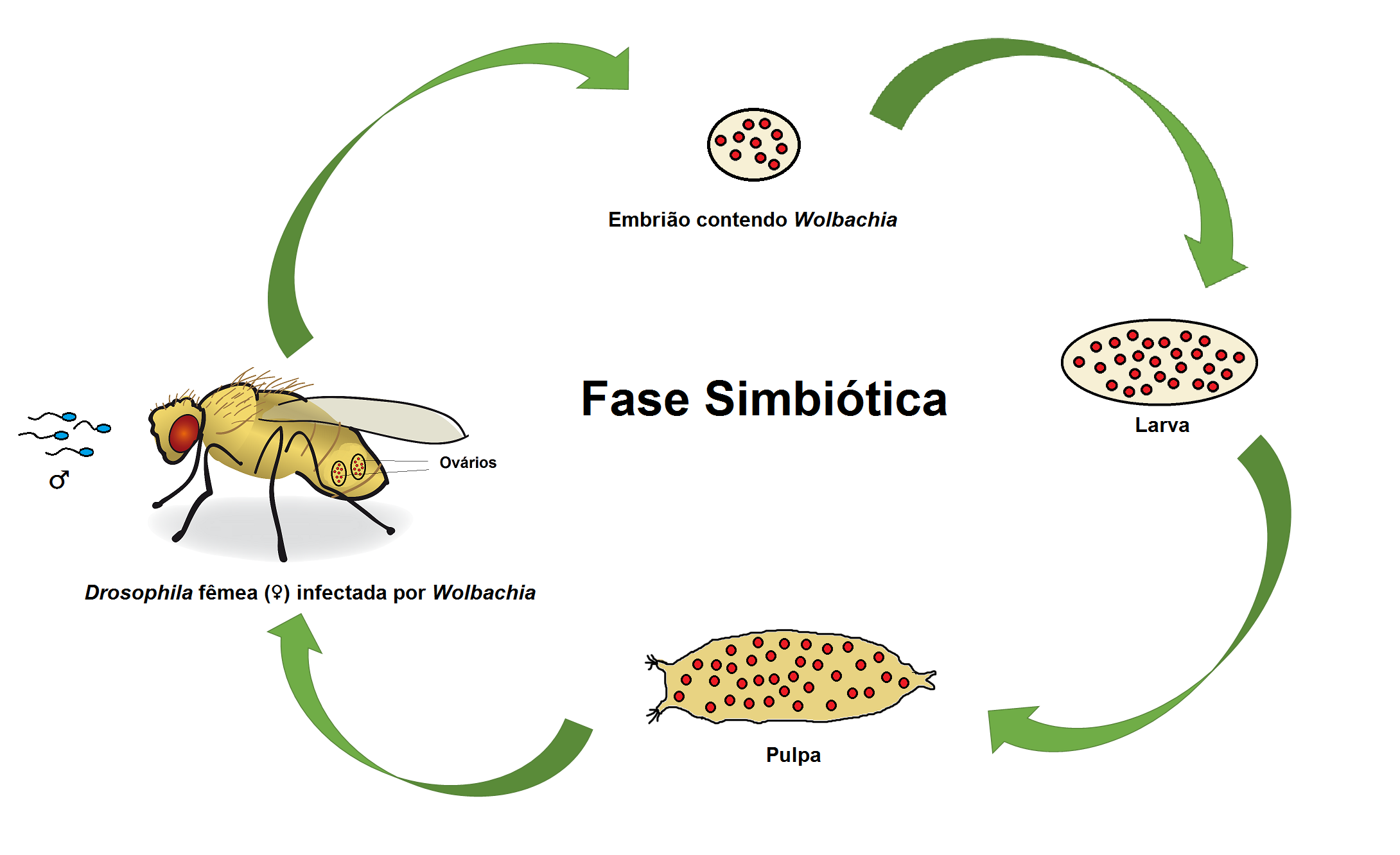
Vertical transmission of infection by Wolbachia symbionts through Drosophila. Starting at the top and going clockwise, you have an infected embryo, infected larva, infected pupae, and then in the adult female wolbachia concentrates in the ovaries, ensuring its transmission to the next generation.

Infected sons are less likely to die from Wolbachia infection if their mother possessed a smaller bacterial density. It is speculated that the bacterial density of Wolbachia inside a host can vary, depending on the antibiotic activity of larval or adult food sources, possible host defense mechanisms, the age of the host, bacterial interactions within the host, as well as the environmental conditions that the fly experiences. Currently, there is no evidence for a mechanism in Drosophila innubila that suppresses or inhibits the male-killing effect of Wolbachia.

Additionally, an unknown factor contributes to increased fitness benefits of Wolbachia infection. The presence of a Wolbachia infection can increase the fitness of a female fly by increasing her size and enhancing her fertility. Moreover, the D. innubila DNA nudivirus "DiNV" is a common viral infection amongst this species. It has been shown that certain Wolbachia can protect their hosts against viral infection, even leading to biocontrol strategies that use Wolbachia infection to suppress the spread of viral diseases. What role (if any) Wolbachia plays in defense against viruses is unclear. However, other studies that investigated the contribution of Wolbachia infection to the fitness of Drosophila species suggested that the bacteria can enhance survival of its host in the presence of oxidative stressors as well as prevent other pathogens from infecting the host by outcompeting them for host-derived resources like cholesterol. In addition, it is also suspected that Wolbachia may also be able to manipulate the expression of its host's DNA through utilization of host microRNA.

== Immunity ==
The genome of D. innubila was sequenced for a study in 2019, and boasts a very high quality of assembly, rivalling that of the classic genetic model Drosophila melanogaster. This study highlighted the importance of the interaction between D. innubila and its viruses as implied by patterns of immune evolution in antiviral genes. Notably, natural selection on the immunity and antiviral pathways in D. innubila differ markedly from D. melanogaster, implying divergent evolutionary pressures. The D. innubila DNA virus is similar to the D. melanogaster Kallithea virus. As such, comparisons between D. melanogaster and D. innubila and their viruses promise to inform on the nature of host-virus interactions.

In some mushroom-feeding Drosophila species, such as D. guttifera and D. neotestacea, the antimicrobial peptide gene Diptericin B has been pseudogenized. However this gene is maintained in D. innubila, and is activated upon infection.

== See also ==
- Drosophila quinaria species group
- Drosophila testacea species group
