= Drosophila falleni =

Scientific classification
- Kingdom: Animalia
- Phylum: Arthropoda
- Class: Insecta
- Order: Diptera
- Family: Drosophilidae
- Genus: Drosophila
- Subgenus: Drosophila
- Species group: quinaria
- Species: D. falleni

Binomial name
- Drosophila falleni Wheeler, 1960

Species of fly

Dissected Drosophila falleni infected with juvenile Howardula aoronymphium nematodes

Drosophila falleni is a species of fly found in northeastern North America. A mycophagous insect, it is known to feed on the fruit bodies (mushrooms) of several genera of fungi, including Agaricus, Amanita, Agrocybe, Boletus, Cortinarius, Pluteus Grifola, Polyporus, Hypholoma, Russula, Mycena, Stropharia, and Xerula. The fly can be infested by the parasitic nematode Howardula aoronymphium, which enters the fly larvae when it is feeding on mushrooms.

Drosophila falleni are attracted to mushroom sites by cuing in on specific odourants that are common in rotting mushrooms. However the odourants that attract D. falleni to mushrooms are different from the odours that attract its nematode parasite Howardula aoronymphium. Infection by H. aoronymphium alters D. falleni olfactory preferences, causing infected flies to become more averse to acetate-containing compounds such as ethyl acetate or propyl acetate. Conversely, infected flies become more attracted to 1-nonanol.

The genome of D. falleni was sequenced in 2019 as part of a study on the evolution of immune systems.

== See also ==
- Drosophila quinaria species group
- Drosophila innubila
