= Drosophila cardini =

Scientific classification
- Kingdom: Animalia
- Phylum: Arthropoda
- Class: Insecta
- Order: Diptera
- Family: Drosophilidae
- Genus: Drosophila
- Subgenus: Drosophila
- Species group: cardini
- Species: D. cardini

Binomial name
- Drosophila cardini Sturtevant, 1916

Species of fly

Drosophila cardini is a species of fruit fly in the Drosophila cardini species group.
