= Drosophila bizonata =

Scientific classification
- Domain: Eukaryota
- Kingdom: Animalia
- Phylum: Arthropoda
- Class: Insecta
- Order: Diptera
- Family: Drosophilidae
- Subfamily: Drosophilinae
- Genus: Drosophila
- Subgenus: Drosophila
- Species group: bizonata
- Species: D. bizonata

Binomial name
- Drosophila bizonata Kikkawa and Peng, 1938

Species of fruit fly

Drosophila bizonata is a species of fruit fly in the Drosophila bizonata species group in the Immigrans-tripunctata radiation of the Drosophila subgenus. Drosophila bizonata is found in Japan. D. bizonata breeds and feeds exclusively on mushrooms, and has a high tolerance for ibotenic acid, a toxic compound found in Amanita mushrooms.
