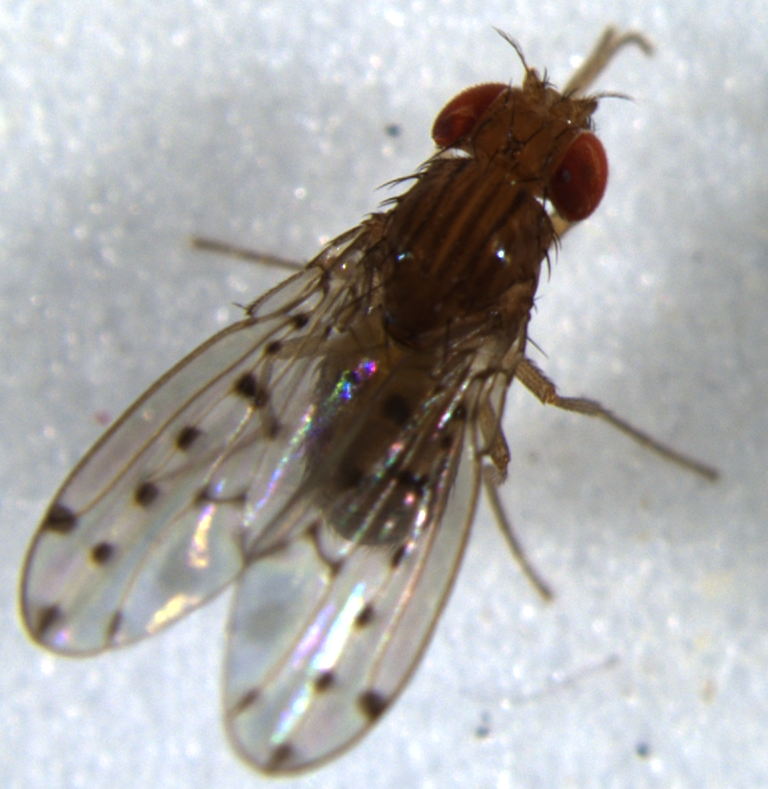
- A D. guttifera male

Scientific classification
- Kingdom: Animalia
- Phylum: Arthropoda
- Class: Insecta
- Order: Diptera
- Family: Drosophilidae
- Genus: Drosophila
- Subgenus: Drosophila
- Species group: quinaria
- Species: D. guttifera

Binomial name
- Drosophila guttifera Walker, 1849

Synonyms
- Drosophila multipunctata Loew, 1866

= Drosophila guttifera =

Species of fly

Drosophila guttifera is a species of vinegar fly in the Drosophila quinaria species group. Like many quinaria group species, D. guttifera feeds on rotting mushrooms.

In 2015, the genome of Drosophila guttifera was sequenced by the laboratory of Sean B. Carroll providing an answer on how different wing patterns emerge in this species, relying on genetic switches called enhancers that drive the polka-dot pattern on the wings of D. guttifera. These enhancers are cis-regulatory elements, which can promote new wing patterns by modifying gene expression, rather than the actual protein being expressed.

== Gallery ==
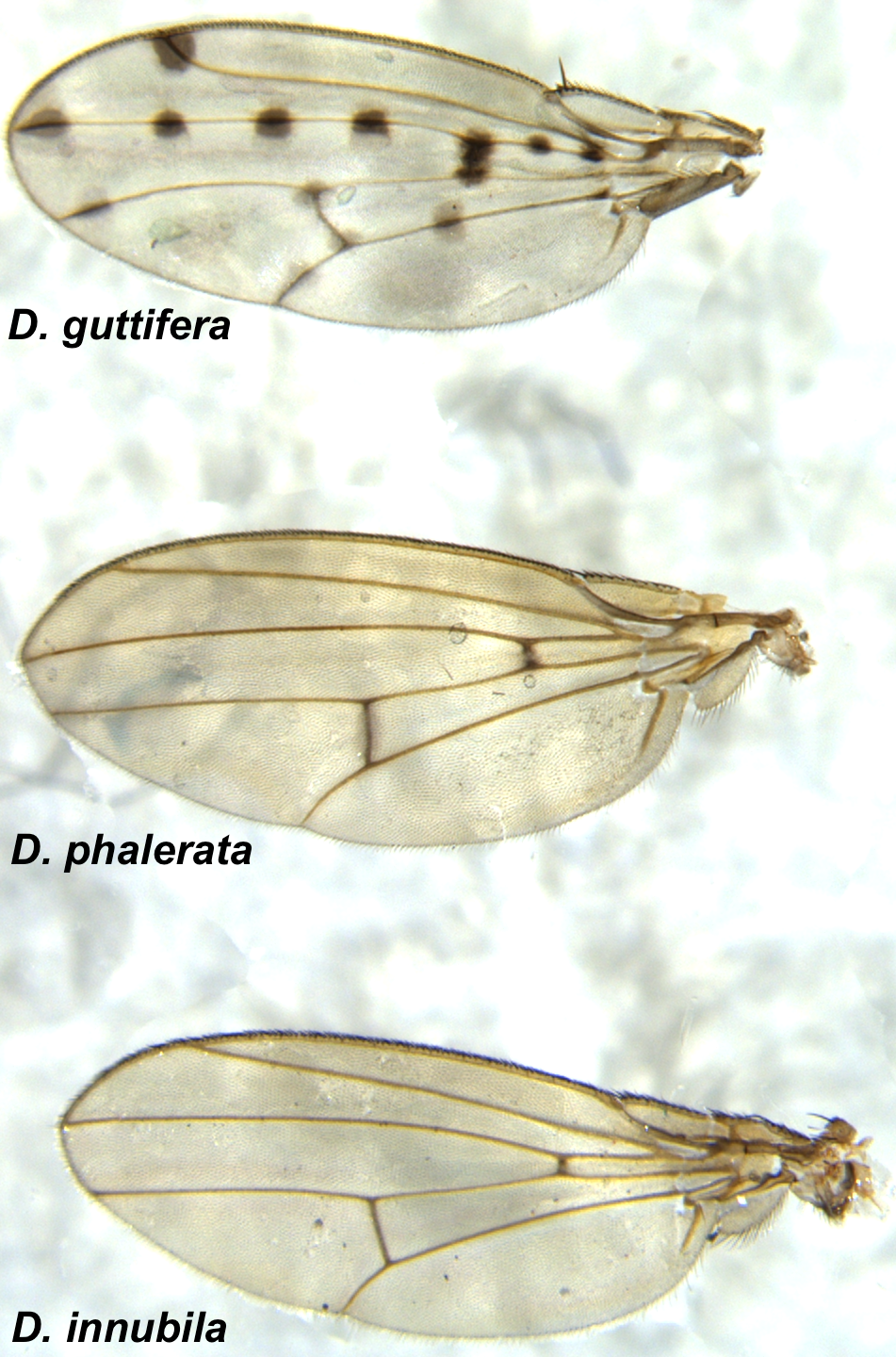
Wing comparisons in the Drosophila quinaria species group

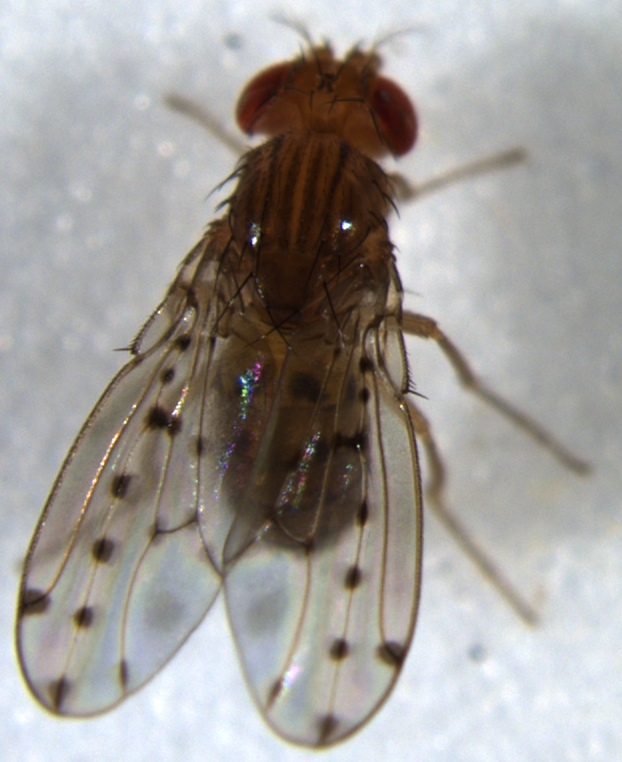
Drosophila guttifera male
