= List of Megaselia species =

This is a list of 1675 species in Megaselia, a genus of scuttle flies in the family Phoridae.

== Megaselia species ==
=== A ===
- Megaselia abalienata Beyer, 1965^{c g}
- Megaselia abdita Schmitz, 1959^{i c g}
- Megaselia abdominalis Beyer, 1958^{c g}
- Megaselia abernethae Disney, 1988^{c g}
- Megaselia abludens Schmitz, 1927^{c g}
- Megaselia abstinens Borgmeier, 1967^{c g}
- Megaselia achatinae (Senior-White, 1924)^{c g}
- Megaselia aciculata Borgmeier, 1964^{i c g}
- Megaselia aculeata (Schmitz, 1919)^{i c g}
- Megaselia acuta Schmitz, 1935^{c g}
- Megaselia acutifurca Borgmeier, 1962^{c g}
- Megaselia acutipennis Bridarolli, 1951^{c g}
- Megaselia adempta Borgmeier, 1969^{c g}
- Megaselia advena Borgmeier, 1964^{i c g}
- Megaselia aemula (Brues, 1911)^{c g}
- Megaselia aequalis (Wood, 1909)^{i c g}
- Megaselia aequaliseta (Borgmeier, 1963)^{i c g}
- Megaselia aequidistans Bridarolli, 1951^{c g}
- Megaselia aequilateralis Schmitz, 1936^{c g}
- Megaselia aequimarginata Bridarolli, 1951^{c g}
- Megaselia aequiperabilis Beyer, 1959^{c g}
- Megaselia aerivaga Schmitz, 1937^{c g}
- Megaselia aestiva Beyer, 1966^{i c g}
- Megaselia affinis (Wood, 1909)^{c g}
- Megaselia afghana Schmitz, 1959^{c g}
- Megaselia africola Beyer, 1965^{c g}
- Megaselia agarici (Lintner, 1895)^{i c g}
- Megaselia agnata Schmitz, 1926^{c g}
- Megaselia agnatoides Beyer, 1958^{c g}
- Megaselia alajuelensis (Malloch, 1914)^{c g}
- Megaselia alata Brues, 1936^{c g}
- Megaselia albibasis Borgmeier, 1966^{i c g}
- Megaselia albicans (Wood, 1908)^{c g}
- Megaselia albicaudata (Wood, 1910)^{c g}
- Megaselia albiclava Schmitz, 1926^{c g}
- Megaselia albiclavata Borgmeier, 1967^{c g}
- Megaselia albocingulata (Strobl, 1906)^{c g}
- Megaselia aldabrae Disney, 2007^{c g}
- Megaselia aldrichi Borgmeier, 1967^{i c g}
- Megaselia aletiae (Comstock, 1880)^{i c g}
- Megaselia alisamorum Disney, 2008^{c g}
- Megaselia aliseta Borgmeier, 1967^{c g}
- Megaselia alius Disney, 2003^{c g}
- Megaselia allopyga Borgmeier, 1966^{i c g}
- Megaselia alloterga Borgmeier, 1967^{c g}
- Megaselia allothrix Borgmeier, 1964^{i c g}
- Megaselia alpina Schmitz & Beyer, 1965^{c g}
- Megaselia alsea Robinson, 1983^{i c g}
- Megaselia altezza Brenner, 2004^{c g}
- Megaselia alticolella (Wood, 1909)^{c g}
- Megaselia altifrons (Wood, 1909)^{c g}
- Megaselia amatorum Disney, 2003^{c g}
- Megaselia amica Borgmeier, 1962^{c g}
- Megaselia amplicornis Borgmeier, 1964^{i c g}
- Megaselia amplicosta Beyer, 1958^{c g}
- Megaselia amplifrons Borgmeier, 1962^{c g}
- Megaselia amplipennis Borgmeier, 1935^{c g}
- Megaselia ampullosa Borgmeier, 1961^{c g}
- Megaselia analis (Lundbeck, 1920)^{c g}
- Megaselia andicola Brues, 1944^{c g}
- Megaselia andrenae Disney, Scanni, Scamoni & Andrietti, 1998^{c g}
- Megaselia andrewi Disney, 2003^{c g}
- Megaselia androidea Bridarolli, 1951^{c g}
- Megaselia aneura Malloch, 1935^{c g}
- Megaselia angelicae (Wood, 1910)^{c g}
- Megaselia angularis (Schmitz, 1924)^{c g}
- Megaselia angulata Gori, 2005^{c g}
- Megaselia angusta (Wood, 1909)^{c g}
- Megaselia angustiata Schmitz, 1936^{c g}
- Megaselia angustifrons (Wood, 1912)^{c g}
- Megaselia angustifurcata (Enderlein, 1912)^{c g}
- Megaselia angustina Schmitz, 1936^{c g}
- Megaselia annulipes (Schmitz, 1921)^{i c g}
- Megaselia anomala (Malloch, 1912)^{i c g}
- Megaselia anomaliseta Beyer, 1958^{c g}
- Megaselia anomaloterga Disney, 1993^{c g}
- Megaselia antecellens Beyer, 1965^{c g}
- Megaselia antennalis Brues, 1936^{c g}
- Megaselia antennula Beyer, 1965^{c g}
- Megaselia anterodorsalis Borgmeier, 1962^{c g}
- Megaselia anterospinosa Borgmeier, 1962^{c g}
- Megaselia anthracina Borgmeier, 1962^{c g}
- Megaselia antialis Borgmeier, 1967^{c g}
- Megaselia anticheira Disney, 2004^{c g}
- Megaselia anticonigra Beyer, 1958^{c g}
- Megaselia apicalis (Brues, 1905)^{c g}
- Megaselia apodicraea Borgmeier, 1971^{c g}
- Megaselia apoensis Brues, 1936^{c g}
- Megaselia apophysata Schmitz, 1940^{c g}
- Megaselia apozona Schmitz, 1936^{c g}
- Megaselia appendiculata Brues, 1936^{c g}
- Megaselia appetens Beyer, 1965^{c g}
- Megaselia apposita Brues, 1936^{c g}
- Megaselia approximata (Brunetti, 1912)^{c g}
- Megaselia aquilonia Schmitz, 1958^{c g}
- Megaselia araneivora Goto, 1985^{c g}
- Megaselia arbuciensis Garcia-Romera^{g}
- Megaselia arcticae Disney, 2004^{c g}
- Megaselia arctifurca Borgmeier, 1967^{c g}
- Megaselia arcuata (Malloch, 1912)^{i c g}
- Megaselia arcuatilinea Beyer, 1959^{c g}
- Megaselia ardua Schmitz, 1940^{c g}
- Megaselia argentea Borgmeier, 1962^{c g}
- Megaselia argiopephaga Disney, 1982^{c g}
- Megaselia arietina Disney, 1991^{c g}
- Megaselia aristalis (Malloch, 1914)^{i c g}
- Megaselia aristata Brues, 1936^{c g}
- Megaselia aristica (Schmitz, 1920)
- Megaselia aristolochiae Hime & Costa, 1985^{c g}
- Megaselia arizonensis (Malloch, 1912)^{i c g}
- Megaselia armata (Wood, 1909)^{c g}
- Megaselia armipectus Borgmeier, 1967^{c g}
- Megaselia armstrongorum ^{g}
- Megaselia arquata Schmitz, 1935^{c g}
- Megaselia artangula Beyer, 1965^{c g}
- Megaselia ashmolei Disney, 1990^{c g}
- Megaselia asthenichaeta Brues, 1944^{c g}
- Megaselia asymmetrica Beyer, 1959^{c g}
- Megaselia aterrima (Strobl, 1906)^{c g}
- Megaselia athesis Brenner, 2006^{c g}
- Megaselia atomella (Malloch, 1912)^{i c g}
- Megaselia atratula Borgmeier, 1964^{i c g}
- Megaselia atriclava (Brues, 1911)^{c g}
- Megaselia atricolor Borgmeier, 1962^{c g}
- Megaselia atricornis Beyer, 1958^{c g}
- Megaselia atridorsata Malloch, 1935^{c g}
- Megaselia atristola Borgmeier, 1962^{c g}
- Megaselia atrita (Brues, 1915)^{c g}
- Megaselia atrosericea Schmitz, 1927^{c g}
- Megaselia atrox Borgmeier, 1968^{i c g}
- Megaselia attenuata Bridarolli, 1951^{c g}
- Megaselia audreyae Disney, 1978^{c g}
- Megaselia aurantiaca Borgmeier, 1971^{c g}
- Megaselia aurea (Aldrich, 1896)^{i c g b}
- Megaselia auriclava Beyer, 1958^{c g}
- Megaselia auricoma Schmitz, 1927^{c g}
- Megaselia austera Schmitz, 1929^{c g}
- Megaselia australiae Beyer, 1960^{c g}

=== B ===
- Megaselia badia Schmitz, 1938^{c g}
- Megaselia baezi Disney, 1990^{c g}
- Megaselia baileyai Hartop, Brown, & Disney 2016
- Megaselia baltica (Schmitz, 1924)^{c g}
- Megaselia bambootelmatae Disney, 1995^{c g}
- Megaselia barbata Brues, 1936^{c g}
- Megaselia barberi (Malloch, 1912)^{i c g}
- Megaselia barbertonia Schmitz, 1929^{c g}
- Megaselia barbicauda Borgmeier, 1967^{c g}
- Megaselia barbimargo Beyer, 1960^{c g}
- Megaselia barbitergata Beyer, 1965^{c g}
- Megaselia barbulata (Wood, 1909)^{c g}
- Megaselia baroringensis Brues, 1936^{c g}
- Megaselia barrientosi Garcia-Romera^{g}
- Megaselia barroensis Disney, 2007^{c g}
- Megaselia basicavata Borgmeier, 1964^{i c g}
- Megaselia basichaeta Borgmeier, 1969^{c g}
- Megaselia basicrinalis Schmitz, 1953^{c g}
- Megaselia basipecten Beyer, 1965^{c g}
- Megaselia basiseta Malloch, 1935^{c g}
- Megaselia basispinata Lundbeck, 1920^{i c g}
- Megaselia basitarsalis Beyer, 1964^{i c g}
- Megaselia basitumida Schmitz, 1927^{c g}
- Megaselia basiturgida Disney & Durska, 2011
- Megaselia basiveluta Schmitz, 1935^{c g}
- Megaselia basseti Disney, 2011
- Megaselia beatricis Colyer, 1962^{c g}
- Megaselia beckeri (Wood, 1909)^{i c g}
- Megaselia bella (Brues, 1905)^{c g}
- Megaselia belumensis Disney, 1995^{c g}
- Megaselia benebarbata Beyer, 1965^{c g}
- Megaselia beringensis Borgmeier, 1964^{i c g}
- Megaselia berndeseni (Schmitz, 1919)^{c g}
- Megaselia berndseni (Schmitz, 1919)^{g}
- Megaselia beyeri Schmitz, 1965^{c g}
- Megaselia bezziana (Enderlein, 1912)^{c g}
- Megaselia biarticulata Disney, 1988^{c g}
- Megaselia bicolor (Meigen, 1830)^{c g}
- Megaselia bifida Disney, 1983^{c g}
- Megaselia bifurcata Disney, 1983^{c g}
- Megaselia bihamulata Brues, 1936^{c g}
- Megaselia bilobulus Disney, 2003^{c g}
- Megaselia bimaculata Borgmeier, 1966^{i c g}
- Megaselia bingana Disney, 1991^{c g}
- Megaselia bipunctata Borgmeier, 1963^{c g}
- Megaselia birdensis Disney, 2006^{c g}
- Megaselia bisecta Brues, 1936^{c g}
- Megaselia biseta Beyer, 1960^{c g}
- Megaselia bisetalis Fang & Liu, 2005^{c g}
- Megaselia bisetigera Beyer, 1965^{c g}
- Megaselia bisetulata (Malloch, 1915)^{i c g}
- Megaselia bisinuata Borgmeier, 1962^{c g}
- Megaselia bispatulata Bridarolli, 1951^{c g}
- Megaselia bisticta ^{g}
- Megaselia bistruncata Schmitz, 1936^{c g}
- Megaselia bivesicata Schmitz, 1931^{c g}
- Megaselia boesii Disney, 2006^{c g}
- Megaselia boliviana (Enderlein, 1912)^{c g}
- Megaselia boninensis Beyer, 1967^{c g}
- Megaselia borgmeieri Beyer, 1965^{c g}
- Megaselia bovista (Gimmerthal, 1848)^{i}
- Megaselia bowlesi Disney, 1981^{c g}
- Megaselia brachyprocta Borgmeier, 1964^{i c g}
- Megaselia bradyi ^{g}
- Megaselia brejchaorum ^{g}
- Megaselia brevibarba Borgmeier, 1964^{i c g}
- Megaselia brevicauda Borgmeier, 1964^{i c g}
- Megaselia breviceps Borgmeier, 1967^{c g}
- Megaselia breviciliata (Strobl, 1899)^{c g}
- Megaselia brevicornis Schmitz, 1938^{g}
- Megaselia brevicostalis (Wood, 1910)^{i c g}
- Megaselia brevifemorata Schmitz, 1926^{c g}
- Megaselia brevifrons Borgmeier, 1962^{c g}
- Megaselia brevineura Brues, 1936^{c g}
- Megaselia brevior (Schmitz, 1924)^{c g}
- Megaselia brevipes (Lundbeck, 1920)^{c g}
- Megaselia brevis (Collin, 1912)^{c g}
- Megaselia breviscula (Brues, 1924)^{g}
- Megaselia brevisecta Brues, 1936^{c g}
- Megaselia breviseta (Wood, 1912)^{c g}
- Megaselia brevissima (Schmitz, 1924)^{c g}
- Megaselia breviterga (Lundback, 1921)^{i c g}
- Megaselia breviuscula (Brues, 1924)^{c g}
- Megaselia brevivallorum Disney, 2003^{c g}
- Megaselia brianbrowni Disney, 1994^{c g}
- Megaselia bridarollii Colyer, 1952^{c g}
- Megaselia brokawi Disney, 1994^{c g}
- Megaselia bruchiana (Borgmeier & Schmitz, 1923)^{c g}
- Megaselia bruesi Disney, 1986^{c g}
- Megaselia brunnea (Schmitz, 1920)^{c g}
- Megaselia brunneicornis (Schmitz, 1920)^{c g}
- Megaselia brunneipalpata Beyer, 1964^{i c g}
- Megaselia brunneipennis Costa, 1857^{c g}
- Megaselia brunneoflava Beyer, 1958^{c g}
- Megaselia brunnicans (Brues, 1924)^{c g}
- Megaselia brunnipennis (Santos Abreu, 1921)^{c g}
- Megaselia brunnipes (Malloch, 1912)^{i c g}
- Megaselia buccata Borgmeier, 1969^{c g}
- Megaselia buchsi Disney, 1999^{c g}
- Megaselia bulbicornis Borgmeier, 1962^{c g}
- Megaselia bulbosa Brues, 1936^{c g}
- Megaselia burmensis Beyer, 1958^{c g}
- Megaselia bursaria Borgmeier, 1971^{c g}
- Megaselia bursata Borgmeier, 1966^{i g}
- Megaselia bursella Borgmeier, 1969^{c g}
- Megaselia burselloides Borgmeier, 1969^{c g}
- Megaselia bursifera Borgmeier, 1971^{c g}
- Megaselia buxtoni Colyer, 1954^{c g}

=== C ===
- Megaselia cakpoae Disney in Disney, Kurina, Tedersoo & Cakpo, 2013
- Megaselia caledoniae Borgmeier, 1967^{c g}
- Megaselia californiensis (Malloch, 1912)^{i c g}
- Megaselia callunae Garcia-Romera^{g}
- Megaselia calvescens Borgmeier, 1962^{c g}
- Megaselia camariana (Coquerel, 1848)^{c g}
- Megaselia camilla Borgmeier, 1964^{i g}
- Megaselia campestris (Wood, 1908)^{c g}
- Megaselia canaliculata (Brues, 1915)^{c g}
- Megaselia canariensis (Santos Abreu, 1921)^{c g}
- Megaselia canaryae Disney, 1990^{c g}
- Megaselia capensis Beyer, 1959^{c g}
- Megaselia capillicauda Borgmeier, 1964^{i c g}
- Megaselia capillipes Schmitz, 1929^{c g}
- Megaselia capronata Schmitz, 1940^{c g}
- Megaselia capta Borgmeier, 1964^{i c g}
- Megaselia carinata Borgmeier, 1967^{c g}
- Megaselia carlynensis (Malloch, 1912)^{i c g}
- Megaselia carminis Garcia-Romera^{g}
- Megaselia carola Robinson, 1981^{i c g}
- Megaselia carthayensis ^{g}
- Megaselia cassandra Borgmeier, 1971^{c g}
- Megaselia castanea Bridarolli, 1937^{c g}
- Megaselia castaneipleura Borgmeier, 1969^{c g}
- Megaselia caudalis Beyer, 1959^{c g}
- Megaselia caudifera Beyer, 1965^{c g}
- Megaselia cavernicola (Brues, 1906)
- Megaselia cavifemur Borgmeier, 1964^{i c g}
- Megaselia cavifrons Schmitz, 1929^{c g}
- Megaselia cavimargo Borgmeier, 1962^{c g}
- Megaselia cercaria Borgmeier, 1969^{c g}
- Megaselia cercisetaria Disney, 2003^{c g}
- Megaselia chaetocera Borgmeier, 1964^{i c g}
- Megaselia chaetogaster Borgmeier, 1971^{c g}
- Megaselia chaetoneura (Malloch, 1912)^{i c g}
- Megaselia chaetopyga (Lundbeck, 1921)^{c g}
- Megaselia chaetorhoea Beyer, 1966^{c g}
- Megaselia chainensis Disney, 1985^{i c g}
- Megaselia chapmani Borgmeier, 1967^{c g}
- Megaselia chilochaeta Borgmeier, 1962^{c g}
- Megaselia chiloensis Schmitz, 1929^{c g}
- Megaselia chinganica Naumov, 1992^{c g}
- Megaselia chinyeroensis Disney, 2010
- Megaselia chipensis (Brues, 1911)^{c g}
- Megaselia chlorocera Borgmeier, 1968^{c g}
- Megaselia chlumetiae Disney, 1992^{c g}
- Megaselia chorogi Naumov, 1979^{c g}
- Megaselia chrysophora Beyer, 1967^{c g}
- Megaselia chrysopyge Beyer, 1965^{c g}
- Megaselia ciancii ^{g}
- Megaselia ciliata (Zetterstedt, 1848)^{c g}
- Megaselia ciliatula Schmitz, 1957^{c g}
- Megaselia cilipes (Brues, 1907)^{c g}
- Megaselia cilla Borgmeier, 1962^{c g}
- Megaselia cinerascens Borgmeier, 1962^{c g}
- Megaselia cinerea Schmitz, 1938^{c g}
- Megaselia cinereifrons (Strobl, 1910)^{c g}
- Megaselia cirratula Schmitz, 1948^{c g}
- Megaselia cirricauda Colyer, 1962^{c g}
- Megaselia cirripes Borgmeier, 1964^{i c g}
- Megaselia cirripyga Borgmeier, 1964^{i c g}
- Megaselia cirriventris Schmitz, 1929^{i c g}
- Megaselia citrinella Buck & Disney, 2001^{c g}
- Megaselia claggi Brues, 1936^{c g}
- Megaselia clara (Schmitz, 1921)^{i c g}
- Megaselia claricornis Colyer, 1962^{c g}
- Megaselia claripennis Bridarolli, 1951^{c g}
- Megaselia claudia Borgmeier, 1967^{c g}
- Megaselia clavipedella Brues, 1936^{c g}
- Megaselia clementsi Disney, 1978^{c g}
- Megaselia clemonsi Disney, 1984^{c g}
- Megaselia coacta (Lundbeck, 1920)^{c g}
- Megaselia coaetanea Schmitz, 1929^{c g}
- Megaselia coalescens Borgmeier, 1962^{c g}
- Megaselia coarctipennis Borgmeier, 1962^{c g}
- Megaselia coccyx Schmitz, 1965^{i c g}
- Megaselia cochlophila Borgmeier, 1967^{c g}
- Megaselia coei Schmitz, 1938^{c g}
- Megaselia cognoscibilis Beyer, 1958^{c g}
- Megaselia collini (Wood, 1909)^{c g}
- Megaselia colyeri (Beyer, 1966)^{c g}
- Megaselia comfurcula Beyer, 1965^{c g}
- Megaselia communiformis (Schmitz, 1918)^{c g}
- Megaselia communis Borgmeier, 1962^{c g}
- Megaselia comorosensis Disney, 2005^{c g}
- Megaselia comosa (Santos Abreu, 1921)^{c g}
- Megaselia compacta Schmitz, 1940^{c g}
- Megaselia compacticeps Borgmeier, 1964^{c g}
- Megaselia compactipes Borgmeier, 1964^{i g}
- Megaselia compar Beyer, 1958^{c g}
- Megaselia comparabilis Bridarolli, 1951^{c g}
- Megaselia compressa Borgmeier, 1966^{i c g}
- Megaselia concava (Borgmeier, 1925)^{c g}
- Megaselia confirmata Borgmeier, 1962^{c g}
- Megaselia conflugens Borgmeier, 1964^{c g}
- Megaselia conformipar Schmitz, 1958^{c g}
- Megaselia conformis (Wood, 1909)^{c g}
- Megaselia confortata Schmitz, 1929^{c g}
- Megaselia conglomerata (Malloch, 1912)^{i c g}
- Megaselia congrex Beyer, 1965^{c g}
- Megaselia congrua Schmitz, 1926^{c g}
- Megaselia conifera Borgmeier, 1967^{c g}
- Megaselia connexa Borgmeier, 1962^{c g}
- Megaselia consetigera (Schmitz, 1925)^{c g}
- Megaselia consimilis (Lundbeck, 1920)^{c g}
- Megaselia consobrina Beyer, 1958^{c g}
- Megaselia conspicua Brues, 1936^{c g}
- Megaselia conspicualis (Malloch, 1912)^{i c g}
- Megaselia constricta Colyer, 1962^{c g}
- Megaselia constrictior Schmitz, 1929^{c g}
- Megaselia consueta (Collin, 1912)^{c g}
- Megaselia continuata Bridarolli, 1951^{c g}
- Megaselia copalina (Meunier, 1905)^{c g}
- Megaselia copiosa Borgmeier, 1967^{c g}
- Megaselia cordobensis (Malloch, 1912)^{c g}
- Megaselia corkerae Disney, 1981^{c g}
- Megaselia cornipalpis ^{g}
- Megaselia correlata (Schmitz, 1918)^{g}
- Megaselia costalis (Roser, 1840)^{c g}
- Megaselia costella Beyer, 1965^{i c g}
- Megaselia costipennis Brues, 1936^{c g}
- Megaselia cothurnata (Schmitz, 1919)^{c g}
- Megaselia coulsoni Disney, 1987^{c g}
- Megaselia crassicosta (Strobl, 1892)^{c g}
- Megaselia crassicostata Beyer, 1965^{c g}
- Megaselia crassilla Schmitz, 1926^{c g}
- Megaselia crassimana (Brues, 1905)^{c g}
- Megaselia crassipes (Wood, 1909)^{i c g}
- Megaselia crassirostris Borgmeier, 1962^{c g}
- Megaselia crassitarsalis Borgmeier, 1931^{c g}
- Megaselia crassivenia Schmitz, 1927^{c g}
- Megaselia creasoni ^{g}
- Megaselia crellini Disney, 2011
- Megaselia crepidata Borgmeier, 1964^{i c g}
- Megaselia cribella Borgmeier, 1964^{i c g}
- Megaselia crinellicosta (Enderlein, 1912)^{c g}
- Megaselia crinellifemur Borgmeier, 1969^{c g}
- Megaselia crinifrons Borgmeier, 1966^{i c g}
- Megaselia criniloba Beyer, 1966^{c g}
- Megaselia crinipyga Borgmeier, 1969^{c g}
- Megaselia crinita Schmitz, 1939^{c g}
- Megaselia criniticauda Colyer, 1962^{c g}
- Megaselia criniventris Borgmeier, 1958^{c g}
- Megaselia cristicincta Beyer, 1965^{c g}
- Megaselia crocea Borgmeier, 1967^{c g}
- Megaselia croceifascia Borgmeier, 1962^{c g}
- Megaselia croceiventris Borgmeier, 1971^{c g}
- Megaselia crocicornis Borgmeier, 1962^{c g}
- Megaselia croeciclava Borgmeier, 1964^{i c g}
- Megaselia crosskeyi Beyer, 1965^{c g}
- Megaselia ctenophora Beyer, 1965^{c g}
- Megaselia cuneata Borgmeier, 1962^{i c g}
- Megaselia curtibarba Beyer, 1964^{i c g}
- Megaselia curticauda Borgmeier, 1967^{c g}
- Megaselia curticiliata Borgmeier, 1967^{c g}
- Megaselia curticosta Borgmeier, 1966^{i c g}
- Megaselia curtifrons (Brues, 1915)^{c g}
- Megaselia curtineura (Brues, 1909)^{c g}
- Megaselia curtinoides Disney, 1991^{c g}
- Megaselia curtispinosa Disney, 1991^{c g}
- Megaselia curtissima Beyer, 1967^{c g}
- Megaselia curva (Brues, 1911)^{c g}
- Megaselia curvata Bridarolli, 1951^{c g}
- Megaselia curvicapilla Schmitz, 1947^{c g}
- Megaselia curvitibia Beyer, 1965^{c g}
- Megaselia curvivenia Schmitz, 1928^{c g}
- Megaselia cybele Borgmeier, 1962^{c g}

=== D ===
- Megaselia daemon Bridarolli, 1951^{c g}
- Megaselia dahli (Becker, 1901)^{c g}
- Megaselia damasi Disney, 1985^{c g}
- Megaselia daphne Borgmeier, 1962^{c g}
- Megaselia darlingtonae Disney, 1995^{c g}
- Megaselia dawahi Disney, 2006^{c g}
- Megaselia debilis (Brues, 1905)^{c g}
- Megaselia debilitata Brues, 1936^{c g}
- Megaselia deceptrix Beyer, 1966^{c g}
- Megaselia decipiens (Meijere, 1910)^{c g}
- Megaselia decora Robinson, 1978^{i c g}
- Megaselia decussata Borgmeier, 1966^{i c g}
- Megaselia defecta Borgmeier, 1969^{c g}
- Megaselia defibaughorum ^{g}
- Megaselia deficiens Borgmeier, 1962^{c g}
- Megaselia definita Borgmeier, 1969^{c g}
- Megaselia deflexilinea Beyer, 1958^{c g}
- Megaselia delicatula (Brues, 1905)^{c g}
- Megaselia deltofemoralis Disney, 2011^{g}
- Megaselia deltoides Borgmeier, 1964^{i c g}
- Megaselia deltomera (Schmitz, 1924)^{c g}
- Megaselia deltomima Borgmeier, 1964^{i c g}
- Megaselia deningi Disney, 1981^{c g}
- Megaselia dennerti Disney & Beyer, 2005^{c g}
- Megaselia densa Bridarolli, 1951^{c g}
- Megaselia densior Schmitz, 1927^{c g}
- Megaselia dentata Disney, 1991^{c g}
- Megaselia depililobulus Disney & Durska, 2011
- Megaselia deprivata Borgmeier, 1969^{c g}
- Megaselia destituta Beyer, 1965^{c g}
- Megaselia destructor (Malloch, 1915)^{c g}
- Megaselia deuteromegas Borgmeier, 1969^{c g}
- Megaselia devia Schmitz, 1936^{c g}
- Megaselia dewittei Beyer, 1965^{c g}
- Megaselia dewittensis Disney, 2003^{c g}
- Megaselia dewulfi Bridarolli, 1951^{c g}
- Megaselia diana Borgmeier, 1951^{c g}
- Megaselia dichroma Beyer, 1958^{c g}
- Megaselia dickoni Wakeford, 1994^{c g}
- Megaselia differens Schmitz, 1948^{c g}
- Megaselia difficilis (Malloch, 1912)^{i c g}
- Megaselia digitalis Schmitz, 1957^{c g}
- Megaselia digiturgida Disney, 2008^{c g}
- Megaselia digressa Brues, 1936^{c g}
- Megaselia dilatata (Brues, 1919)^{i c g}
- Megaselia dilatimana Disney, 2006^{c g}
- Megaselia dimidata Brues, 1936^{c g}
- Megaselia dimidia Schmitz, 1926^{c g}
- Megaselia diminuta Borgmeier, 1962^{c g}
- Megaselia dimorphica Disney, 1997^{c g}
- Megaselia dinacantha Borgmeier, 1967^{c g}
- Megaselia dinda Borgmeier, 1962^{c g}
- Megaselia diplochaeta Borgmeier, 1969^{c g}
- Megaselia diplothrix Borgmeier, 1964^{i c g}
- Megaselia dipsacosa Smith, 1977^{g}
- Megaselia directa Brues, 1936^{c g}
- Megaselia discolor Beyer, 1958^{c g}
- Megaselia discrepans Borgmeier, 1971^{c g}
- Megaselia discreta (Wood, 1909)^{c g}
- Megaselia disiuncta Borgmeier, 1958^{c g}
- Megaselia disneyella Brenner, 2006^{c g}
- Megaselia disparifemur Borgmeier, 1962^{c g}
- Megaselia disparipennis Borgmeier, 1962^{c g}
- Megaselia dispariseta Borgmeier, 1962^{c g}
- Megaselia dispariterga Borgmeier, 1971^{c g}
- Megaselia dissita Borgmeier, 1967^{c g}
- Megaselia divergens (Malloch, 1912)^{i c g}
- Megaselia diversa (Wood, 1909)^{c g}
- Megaselia dolichoptera Bridarolli, 1937^{c g}
- Megaselia donahuei ^{g}
- Megaselia doryphora Schmitz, 1957^{c g}
- Megaselia drakei Disney, 1984^{c g}
- Megaselia dreisbachi Borgmeier, 1964^{i c g}
- Megaselia dubitalis (Wood, 1908)^{c g}
- Megaselia dubitata (Malloch, 1912)^{i c g}
- Megaselia dupliciseta Bridarolli, 1937^{c g}
- Megaselia durskae Disney, 1989^{c g}

=== E ===
- Megaselia ebejeri Disney, 2006^{c g}
- Megaselia eccoptomera Schmitz, 1927^{i c g}
- Megaselia ectopia Borgmeier, 1964^{i c g}
- Megaselia edenensis Disney, 2008^{c g}
- Megaselia egena (Collin, 1912)^{c g}
- Megaselia eisfelderae Schmitz, 1948^{i c g}
- Megaselia elegantula Borgmeier, 1969^{c g}
- Megaselia eleuthera Borgmeier, 1964^{i c g}
- Megaselia elongata (Wood, 1914)^{c g}
- Megaselia emarginata (Wood, 1908)^{c g}
- Megaselia eminens Schmitz, 1953^{c g}
- Megaselia enderleini (Brues, 1912)^{c g}
- Megaselia epanquadrata Disney, 2004^{c g}
- Megaselia equisecta Brues, 1936^{c g}
- Megaselia erecta (Wood, 1910)^{i c g}
- Megaselia errata (Wood, 1912)^{c g}
- Megaselia ethiopia (Meunier, 1905)^{c g}
- Megaselia eupygis Schmitz, 1929^{c g}
- Megaselia euryprocta Schmitz, 1957^{c g}
- Megaselia evaginata Beyer, 1965^{c g}
- Megaselia evoluta Bridarolli, 1951^{c g}
- Megaselia exaltata (Malloch, 1914)^{c g}
- Megaselia exangulata Schmitz, 1947^{c g}
- Megaselia exarcuata Schmitz, 1927^{c g}
- Megaselia excavata Schmitz, 1927^{c g}
- Megaselia excisa Beyer, 1966^{c g}
- Megaselia excisoides Beyer, 1966^{c g}
- Megaselia excorticata Disney, 2009
- Megaselia exiens Borgmeier, 1971^{c g}
- Megaselia exquisita Borgmeier, 1962^{c g}
- Megaselia exsecta Schmitz, 1957^{c g}
- Megaselia exsertacosta Disney, 1995^{c g}
- Megaselia extans (Collin, 1912)^{c g}
- Megaselia extensicosta Borgmeier, 1967^{c g}
- Megaselia extensifrons Brues, 1936^{c g}
- Megaselia exuberans Borgmeier, 1967^{c g}

=== F ===
- Megaselia falciphalli Disney, 2003^{c g}
- Megaselia falklandensis Disney, 1989^{c g}
- Megaselia fallobreviseta Disney, 2011
- Megaselia falloconsueta Disney, 2006^{c g}
- Megaselia falsoluta Disney, 2006^{c g}
- Megaselia fasciiventris (Enderlein, 1912)^{c g}
- Megaselia fasciventris (Becker, 1914)^{c g}
- Megaselia fastigiicola Beyer, 1959^{c g}
- Megaselia fausta Borgmeier, 1969^{c g}
- Megaselia femoralis (Enderlein, 1912)^{i c g}
- Megaselia fenestralis (Schmitz, 1919)
- Megaselia fenestrata (Malloch, 1912)^{i c g}
- Megaselia fennicola (Beyer, 1958)
- Megaselia ferimpariseta Disney, 2003^{c g}
- Megaselia feronia Schmitz, 1934^{c g}
- Megaselia ferruginosa (Brues, 1912)^{c g}
- Megaselia feshiensis Disney, 1987^{c g}
- Megaselia ficaria Disney, 1991^{c g}
- Megaselia filamentosa Schmitz, 1958^{c g}
- Megaselia filiciarboris Disney, 2003^{c g}
- Megaselia fimbriata Borgmeier, 1962^{c g}
- Megaselia finitima Beyer, 1965^{c g}
- Megaselia fisheri (Malloch, 1912)^{i c g}
- Megaselia flammula Schmitz, 1928^{c g}
- Megaselia flava (Fallen, 1823)^{i c g}
- Megaselia flavescens (Wood, 1909)^{c g}
- Megaselia flavibasis Beyer, 1958^{c g}
- Megaselia flavicans Schmitz, 1935^{c g}
- Megaselia flavicoxa (Zetterstedt, 1848)^{c g}
- Megaselia flavidula Beyer, 1958^{c g}
- Megaselia flavifacies (Brunetti, 1912)^{c g}
- Megaselia flavifacioides (Senior-White, 1922)^{c g}
- Megaselia flavifrons Beyer, 1958^{c g}
- Megaselia flavipes Borgmeier, 1962^{c g}
- Megaselia flaviscutellata Beyer, 1960^{c g}
- Megaselia flavistola Borgmeier, 1967^{c g}
- Megaselia flaviventris (Santos Abreu, 1921)^{c g}
- Megaselia flavohalterata (Enderlein, 1912)^{c g}
- Megaselia flavopleura (Malloch, 1914)^{c g}
- Megaselia flexivena Borgmeier, 1971^{c g}
- Megaselia floccicauda Disney, 2006^{c g}
- Megaselia floricola Borgmeier, 1967^{c g}
- Megaselia foederalis Borgmeier, 1962^{c g}
- Megaselia fomitopsis Naumov, 1992^{c g}
- Megaselia formosana (Brues, 1924)^{c g}
- Megaselia forntinervis Schmitz, 1926^{g}
- Megaselia forticosta Beyer, 1958^{c g}
- Megaselia fortinervis Schmitz, 1926^{c g}
- Megaselia fortipes Borgmeier, 1967^{c g}
- Megaselia fortirostris Borgmeier, 1969^{c g}
- Megaselia fortiuscula (Brues, 1915)^{c g}
- Megaselia frameata Schmitz, 1927^{c g}
- Megaselia francoae ^{g}
- Megaselia franconiensis (Malloch, 1912)^{i c g}
- Megaselia fratercula (Santos Abreu, 1921)^{c g}
- Megaselia fraudulatrix Beyer, 1958^{c g}
- Megaselia friedrichae Hartop, Brown, & Disney 2016
- Megaselia frontalis (Wood, 1909)^{c g}
- Megaselia frontata (Collin, 1912)^{c g}
- Megaselia frontella Beyer, 1966^{c g}
- Megaselia fujiokai ^{g}
- Megaselia fulminifacies Beyer, 1965^{c g}
- Megaselia fulvicauda Brues, 1936^{c g}
- Megaselia fulviobscura (Santos Abreu, 1921)^{c g}
- Megaselia fulvipalpis (Santos Abreu, 1921)^{c g}
- Megaselia fumata (Malloch, 1909)^{c g}
- Megaselia fumipennis (Brues, 1907)^{c g}
- Megaselia funeralis Schmitz, 1928^{c g}
- Megaselia funesta Schmitz, 1935
- Megaselia fungicola (Coquillett, 1895)^{i c g}
- Megaselia fungivora (Wood, 1909)^{i c g}
- Megaselia furcatilis Beyer, 1964^{i c g}
- Megaselia furcatipennis Schmitz, 1934^{c g}
- Megaselia furcella (Enderlein, 1912)^{c g}
- Megaselia furcellans Beyer, 1966^{c g}
- Megaselia furcilla Schmitz, 1957^{g}
- Megaselia furcipriva Borgmeier, 1963^{c g}
- Megaselia furculae Disney, 2006^{c g}
- Megaselia furtiva (Aldrich, 1896)^{c g}
- Megaselia furukawae Disney, 1989^{c g}
- Megaselia furva Schmitz, 1929^{c g}
- Megaselia furvicolor Beyer, 1959^{c g}
- Megaselia fusca (Wood, 1909)^{c g}
- Megaselia fuscamplicosta Disney, 2006^{c g}
- Megaselia fusciclava Schmitz, 1935^{c g}
- Megaselia fuscilobulorum Disney in Disney, Kurina, Tedersoo & Cakpo, 2013
- Megaselia fuscinervis (Wood, 1908)^{c g}
- Megaselia fuscinula (Schmitz, 1926)^{c g}
- Megaselia fuscipalpis (Lundbeck, 1920)^{c g}
- Megaselia fuscipleura Borgmeier, 1962^{c g}
- Megaselia fuscivertex (Enderlein, 1912)^{c g}
- Megaselia fuscoides Schmitz, 1934^{c g}
- Megaselia fuscomaculata Borgmeier, 1958^{c g}
- Megaselia fuscopleuralis Schmitz, 1929^{c g}
- Megaselia fuscovariana Schmitz, 1933^{c g}
- Megaselia fuscula Borgmeier, 1962^{c g}
- Megaselia fusipalpis Borgmeier, 1966^{i c g}

=== G ===
- Megaselia gallagheri Disney, 2006^{c g}
- Megaselia galogensis Brues, 1936^{c g}
- Megaselia gargarans Schmitz, 1948^{c g}
- Megaselia gartensis Disney, 1985^{i c g}
- Megaselia gemella Borgmeier, 1962^{c g}
- Megaselia gemellima Beyer, 1965^{c g}
- Megaselia genuina (Strobl, 1894)^{c g}
- Megaselia georgiae Borgmeier, 1964^{i c g}
- Megaselia gerlachi Disney, 2005^{c g}
- Megaselia gigantea Brenner, 2004^{c g}
- Megaselia gilvivitta Beyer, 1965^{c g}
- Megaselia giraudii (Egger, 1862)^{i}
- Megaselia glabrifrons (Wood, 1909)^{i c g}
- Megaselia glabrimargo Buck & Disney, 2001^{c g}
- Megaselia glandularis Borgmeier, 1958^{c g}
- Megaselia globicornis Schmitz, 1948^{c g}
- Megaselia globipyga Borgmeier, 1966^{i c g b}
- Megaselia globulosa Beyer, 1965^{c g}
- Megaselia gloriosa Borgmeier, 1958^{c g}
- Megaselia goidanichi Schmitz, 1927^{c g}
- Megaselia gombakensis Disney, 1993^{c g}
- Megaselia goniata Borgmeier, 1964^{i c g}
- Megaselia gotoi Disney, 1989^{c g}
- Megaselia gouteuxi Disney, 2004^{c g}
- Megaselia gracilipalpis Borgmeier, 1969^{c g}
- Megaselia gracilipes Borgmeier, 1964^{i c g}
- Megaselia gradualis Borgmeier, 1971^{c g}
- Megaselia grandantennata Beyer, 1966^{c g}
- Megaselia grandicosta Borgmeier, 1958^{c g}
- Megaselia grandifurca Borgmeier, 1958^{c g}
- Megaselia grandipennis Borgmeier, 1967^{c g}
- Megaselia grandlabella Disney, 2003^{c g}
- Megaselia gratiosa Schmitz, 1939^{c g}
- Megaselia gravis Borgmeier, 1964^{i c g}
- Megaselia gregaria (Wood, 1910)^{c g}
- Megaselia gressitti Beyer, 1967^{c g}
- Megaselia grisaria Schmitz, 1933^{c g}
- Megaselia griseifrons (Lundbeck, 1920)^{c g}
- Megaselia griseipennis (Santos Abreu, 1921)^{c g}
- Megaselia groenlandica (Lundbeck, 1901)^{i c g}
- Megaselia guentermuelleri Mostovski, 2015

=== H ===
- Megaselia halterata (Wood, 1910)^{i c g}
- Megaselia hamaticauda Borgmeier, 1969^{c g}
- Megaselia hanseni Disney, 2006^{c g}
- Megaselia hapalogaster Borgmeier, 1971^{c g}
- Megaselia haraldlundi Disney, 1995^{c g}
- Megaselia haranti Delage & Lauraire, 1970^{g}
- Megaselia hardingorum ^{g}
- Megaselia harteni Disney, 1991^{c g}
- Megaselia hartfordensis Disney, 1983^{c g}
- Megaselia hauclaudia Disney, 2003^{c g}
- Megaselia hayleyensis Disney, 1987^{c g}
- Megaselia hebblewhitei Disney, 2003^{c g}
- Megaselia hebetifrons Beyer, 1959^{c g}
- Megaselia hectochaeta Schmitz & Beyer, 1965^{c g}
- Megaselia heini ^{g}
- Megaselia hemicyclia Beyer, 1965^{c g}
- Megaselia hendersoni Disney, 1979^{c g}
- Megaselia henrydisneyi Durska, 1998^{c g}
- Megaselia hentschkeae ^{g}
- Megaselia hepworthae Disney, 1981^{c g}
- Megaselia hesperia Borgmeier, 1966^{i c g}
- Megaselia heterochaeta Beyer, 1966^{c g}
- Megaselia heterodactyla Beyer, 1964^{i c g}
- Megaselia hexacantha Borgmeier, 1971^{c g}
- Megaselia hexachaeta Borgmeier, 1962^{c g}
- Megaselia hexamegas Borgmeier, 1962^{c g}
- Megaselia hexanophila Buck & Disney, 2001^{c g}
- Megaselia hibernans Schmitz, 1934^{c g}
- Megaselia hibernica Schmitz, 1938^{c g}
- Megaselia hilaris Schmitz, 1927^{c g}
- Megaselia hirsuta (Wood, 1910)^{c g}
- Megaselia hirticaudata (Wood, 1910)^{c g}
- Megaselia hirticrus (Schmitz, 1918)^{c g}
- Megaselia hirtitarsalis Beyer, 1966^{c g}
- Megaselia hirtiventris (Wood, 1909)^{c g}
- Megaselia hispida Borgmeier, 1966^{i c g}
- Megaselia hoffmanorum ^{g}
- Megaselia hoggorum ^{g}
- Megaselia hoguei ^{g}
- Megaselia holosericei Disney & Brown, 2003^{c g}
- Megaselia horsfieldi Disney, 1986^{c g}
- Megaselia hortensis (Wood, 1909)^{c g}
- Megaselia horticola Borgmeier, 1962^{c g}
- Megaselia huachuca Borgmeier, 1966^{i c g}
- Megaselia humeralis (Zetterstedt, 1836)^{i c g}
- Megaselia humida Disney, 1991^{c g}
- Megaselia hyalipennis (Wood, 1912)^{c g}
- Megaselia hybrida Schmitz, 1939^{c g}
- Megaselia hypochaeta Borgmeier, 1969^{c g}
- Megaselia hypochondrica Borgmeier, 1966^{i c g}
- Megaselia hypopygialis (Lundbeck, 1920)^{c g}

=== I ===
- Megaselia iberiensis Disney, 1999^{c g}
- Megaselia ignicornis Borgmeier, 1962^{c g}
- Megaselia ignobilis (Schmitz, 1919)^{c g}
- Megaselia ilca Borgmeier, 1964^{i c g}
- Megaselia imbricata Borgmeier, 1961^{c g}
- Megaselia imitatrix Borgmeier, 1969^{c g}
- Megaselia immaculipes (Enderlein, 1912)^{c g}
- Megaselia immodensior Buck & Disney, 2001^{c g}
- Megaselia immodesta Beyer, 1965^{c g}
- Megaselia impariseta Bridarolli, 1937^{c g}
- Megaselia imperfecta Borgmeier, 1967^{c g}
- Megaselia impinguata Schmitz, 1935^{c g}
- Megaselia impressa Borgmeier, 1962^{c g}
- Megaselia inaequalis (Brunetti, 1912)^{c g}
- Megaselia incarum (Brues, 1915)^{c g}
- Megaselia incisa (Malloch, 1912)^{c g}
- Megaselia inclinata Borgmeier, 1971^{c g}
- Megaselia incompleta Brues, 1936^{c g}
- Megaselia incompressa Beyer, 1965^{c g}
- Megaselia incongruens Schmitz, 1940^{c g}
- Megaselia inconspicua Borgmeier, 1967^{c g}
- Megaselia incontaminata (Schmitz, 1926)^{c g}
- Megaselia incostans (Santos Abreu, 1921)^{c g}
- Megaselia incrassata (Schmitz, 1920)^{i c g}
- Megaselia incrassaticosta Bridarolli, 1951^{c g}
- Megaselia indifferens (Lundbeck, 1920)^{c g}
- Megaselia indigesta (Schmitz, 1920)^{c g}
- Megaselia indistincta De Meijere, 1929^{g}
- Megaselia inflaticornis Brues, 1936^{c g}
- Megaselia inflatipes Brues, 1936^{c g}
- Megaselia infracta Beyer, 1965^{c g}
- Megaselia infraposita (Wood, 1909)^{c g}
- Megaselia infumata (Malloch, 1912)^{i c g}
- Megaselia innocens (Collin, 1912)^{c g}
- Megaselia innotata Beyer, 1958^{c g}
- Megaselia inornata (Malloch, 1912)^{i c g}
- Megaselia inquinata Schmitz, 1953^{c g}
- Megaselia insecta Schmitz, 1953
- Megaselia insignicauda Disney, 2008^{c g}
- Megaselia insolens Beyer, 1965^{c g}
- Megaselia insons (Lundbeck, 1920)^{c g}
- Megaselia integra Borgmeier, 1964^{i c g}
- Megaselia intercedens Beyer, 1965^{c g}
- Megaselia intercostata (Lundbeck, 1921)^{c g}
- Megaselia intergeriva Schmitz, 1948^{c g}
- Megaselia intermedia Santos Abreu, 1921^{g}
- Megaselia intersecta Schmitz, 1935^{c g}
- Megaselia intonsa Schmitz, 1948^{c g}
- Megaselia introlapsa Schmitz, 1937^{c g}
- Megaselia invenusta (Collin, 1912)^{c g}
- Megaselia invernessae Disney, 1988^{c g}
- Megaselia involuta (Wood, 1910)^{c g}
- Megaselia irene Borgmeier, 1962^{c g}
- Megaselia iroquoiana (Malloch, 1912)^{i c g}
- Megaselia irregularis Beyer, 1958^{c g}
- Megaselia irwini Disney, 1979^{c g}
- Megaselia isaacmajorum ^{g}
- Megaselia isis Borgmeier, 1962^{c g}
- Megaselia ismayi Disney, 1978^{c g}
- Megaselia ivanis Garcia-Romera^{g}

=== J-K ===
- Megaselia jameslamonti Disney, 1995^{c g}
- Megaselia jani Disney, 2012
- Megaselia jheringi (Borgmeier, 1923)^{c g}
- Megaselia joannae Disney, 1998^{c g}
- Megaselia jochiana Schmitz, 1957^{c g}
- Megaselia johnsoni (Brues, 1916)^{i c g}
- Megaselia jorgensis Disney, 1991^{c g}
- Megaselia juli (Brues, 1908)^{i c g}
- Megaselia juxtaplantata Borgmeier, 1962^{c g}
- Megaselia juxtaposita Borgmeier, 1962^{c g}
- Megaselia kanekoi Disney, 1989^{c g}
- Megaselia kanoi Disney, 1989^{c g}
- Megaselia keiseri Beyer, 1965^{c g}
- Megaselia kelleri ^{g}
- Megaselia killarneyensis Disney, 1988^{c g}
- Megaselia kodongi Disney, 1986^{c g}
- Megaselia kofferi Schmitz^{i g}
- Megaselia kolana Schmitz, 1928^{c g}
- Megaselia konnovi Michailovskaya, 2003^{c g}
- Megaselia kovaci Disney, 1991^{c g}
- Megaselia kozlovi Disney, 2013^{g}
- Megaselia krizelji Delage & Lauraire, 1970^{g}
- Megaselia kuenburgi Schmitz, 1938^{c g}
- Megaselia kurahashii Disney, 1985^{c g}
- Megaselia kurinai Disney in Disney, Kurina, Tedersoo & Cakpo, 2013

=== L ===
- Megaselia labellaspinata Buck & Disney, 2001^{c g}
- Megaselia labellata Borgmeier, 1962^{c g}
- Megaselia labellifera Borgmeier, 1969^{c g}
- Megaselia labialis Brues, 1936^{c g}
- Megaselia labiata Borgmeier, 1967^{c g}
- Megaselia labiella Beyer, 1965^{c g}
- Megaselia labrosa Borgmeier, 1963^{c g}
- Megaselia lactipennis (Lundbeck, 1920)^{c g}
- Megaselia lacunitarsalis ^{g}
- Megaselia lacustris Borgmeier, 1966^{i c g}
- Megaselia laeta (Lundbeck, 1920)^{c g}
- Megaselia laeviceps Schmitz, 1948^{c g}
- Megaselia laevigata Borgmeier, 1971^{c g}
- Megaselia laevigoides Borgmeier, 1971^{c g}
- Megaselia laevubrevis Disney, 2003^{c g}
- Megaselia laffooni Robinson, 1978^{i c g}
- Megaselia lalunensis Brues, 1936^{c g}
- Megaselia lamellicauda Borgmeier, 1966^{i c g}
- Megaselia lanata Robinson, 1981^{i c g}
- Megaselia lanceata Borgmeier, 1962^{i c g}
- Megaselia lanceolata (Brues, 1924)^{c g}
- Megaselia languescens (Schmitz, 1924)^{c g}
- Megaselia lapponica Schmitz, 1928^{c g}
- Megaselia largifrontalis Schmitz, 1939^{c g}
- Megaselia larvivora Disney in Stoepler & Disney, 2013
- Megaselia lata (Wood, 1910)^{c g}
- Megaselia latangula Borgmeier, 1962^{c g}
- Megaselia lateicauda (Borgmeier, 1925)^{i g}
- Megaselia lateralis Schmitz, 1926^{c g}
- Megaselia latericia Schmitz, 1935^{c g}
- Megaselia latibasis Borgmeier, 1964^{i c g}
- Megaselia laticosta Schmitz, 1938^{c g}
- Megaselia laticrus Schmitz, 1927^{c g}
- Megaselia latifasciata (Brunetti, 1912)^{c g}
- Megaselia latifemorata (Becker, 1901)^{c g}
- Megaselia latifrons (Wood, 1910)^{c g}
- Megaselia latifurca Borgmeier, 1967^{c g}
- Megaselia latimanus (Malloch, 1914)^{c}
- Megaselia latinervis (Collin, 1912)^{c g}
- Megaselia latior Schmitz, 1936^{c g}
- Megaselia latipalpis (Schmitz, 1921)^{c g}
- Megaselia latipennis Borgmeier, 1966^{i c g}
- Megaselia latipes Borgmeier, 1933^{c g}
- Megaselia latirostris Borgmeier, 1962^{c g}
- Megaselia latitarsus Beyer, 1958^{c g}
- Megaselia lavoursensis Disney, 2011^{g}
- Megaselia laxa Borgmeier, 1967^{c g}
- Megaselia leleupi Beyer, 1960^{c g}
- Megaselia lenis Borgmeier, 1962^{c g}
- Megaselia leptacina Borgmeier, 1969^{c g}
- Megaselia leptofemur Disney, 2007^{c g}
- Megaselia leucopleuralis Disney, 2006^{c g}
- Megaselia leucozona Schmitz, 1930^{c g}
- Megaselia levifrons Borgmeier, 1962^{c g}
- Megaselia lilliput Beyer, 1959^{c g}
- Megaselia limburgensis (Schmitz, 1918)^{b}
- Megaselia limpachensis Rondani, 1856^{g}
- Megaselia lindbergi Beyer, 1959^{c g}
- Megaselia lindneri Beyer, 1959^{c g}
- Megaselia lineata Borgmeier, 1971^{c g}
- Megaselia lineatipes Borgmeier, 1967^{c g}
- Megaselia linoensis Brues, 1936^{c g}
- Megaselia littoralis (Malloch, 1914)^{c g}
- Megaselia llanquihuea Schmitz, 1929^{c g}
- Megaselia lobatafurcae Disney, 2009
- Megaselia lombardorum ^{g}
- Megaselia longianalis Garcia-Romera^{g}
- Megaselia longibarba Beyer, 1964^{i c g}
- Megaselia longicauda Bridarolli, 1951^{c g}
- Megaselia longiciliata (Strobl, 1899)^{c g}
- Megaselia longicostalis (Wood, 1912)^{c g}
- Megaselia longifurca Lundbeck, 1921
- Megaselia longinqua Bridarolli, 1937^{c g}
- Megaselia longipalpis (Wood, 1910)^{c g}
- Megaselia longipennis (Malloch, 1912)^{i c g}
- Megaselia longiseta (Wood, 1909)^{c g}
- Megaselia longispina (Silva Figueroa, 1916)^{c g}
- Megaselia longistyla Brenner, 2004^{c g}
- Megaselia longula Borgmeier, 1962^{c g}
- Megaselia lucida Bridarolli, 1937^{c g}
- Megaselia lucifrons (Schmitz, 1918)^{c g}
- Megaselia lucipleura Borgmeier, 1962^{c g}
- Megaselia luctuosa (Santos Abreu, 1921)^{c g}
- Megaselia luederwaldti (Enderlein, 1912)^{c g}
- Megaselia lugens Borgmeier, 1962^{c g}
- Megaselia luisieri Schmitz, 1939^{c g}
- Megaselia luminifrons (Schmitz, 1926)^{c g}
- Megaselia luminosa Schmitz, 1952^{c g}
- Megaselia lunaris Borgmeier, 1961^{c g}
- Megaselia lutea (Meigen, 1830)^{i c g}
- Megaselia luteicauda (Borgmeier, 1925)^{c g}
- Megaselia luteiclava Borgmeier, 1967^{c g}
- Megaselia luteicoxa Borgmeier, 1962^{c g}
- Megaselia luteifasciata (Borgmeier, 1925)^{c g}
- Megaselia luteipes (Schmitz, 1918)^{c g}
- Megaselia luteiventris Borgmeier, 1971^{c g}
- Megaselia lutella Schmitz, 1929^{c g}
- Megaselia luteoides Schmitz, 1926^{c g}
- Megaselia lutescens (Wood, 1910)^{c g}

=== M ===
- Megaselia macrochaeta (Malloch, 1912)^{c g}
- Megaselia maculafemoralis Disney, 2008^{c g}
- Megaselia maculiapex Borgmeier, 1935^{c g}
- Megaselia maculifera Beyer, 1965^{c g}
- Megaselia maculipennis Brues, 1936^{c g}
- Megaselia maculithorax Borgmeier, 1971^{c g}
- Megaselia madeiraensis Disney, 2007^{c g}
- Megaselia magignobilis Disney, 2010
- Megaselia magna Beyer, 1959^{c g}
- Megaselia magnifica (Lundbeck, 1920)^{c g}
- Megaselia mainitensis Brues, 1936^{c g}
- Megaselia major (Wood, 1912)^{c g}
- Megaselia malaisei Beyer, 1958^{c g}
- Megaselia malayae Borgmeier, 1967^{c g}
- Megaselia malhamensis Disney, 1986^{c g}
- Megaselia mallochi (Wood, 1909)^{c g}
- Megaselia malvinasensis Disney, 1989^{c g}
- Megaselia mammillata Borgmeier, 1959^{c g}
- Megaselia manca (Brues, 1907)^{c g}
- Megaselia manicata (Wood, 1910)^{c g}
- Megaselia manselli Disney, 1997^{c g}
- Megaselia mantuana Gori, 2005^{c g}
- Megaselia manualis (Malloch, 1912)^{c g}
- Megaselia maranguensis Beyer, 1960^{c g}
- Megaselia marekdurskii Disney, 1998^{c g}
- Megaselia marekudurskii Disney, 1998^{c g}
- Megaselia marginalis (Malloch, 1912)^{i c g}
- Megaselia marina Schmitz, 1937^{c g}
- Megaselia marklanei Disney, 2001^{g}
- Megaselia marquezi ^{g}
- Megaselia martensi Disney, 1999^{c g}
- Megaselia masatierrana (Enderlein, 1938)^{c g}
- Megaselia maura (Wood, 1910)^{c g}
- Megaselia mcleani Disney, 1987^{c g}
- Megaselia meconicera (Speiser, 1925)^{i c g}
- Megaselia media (Collin, 1912)^{c g}
- Megaselia mediata Brues, 1936^{c g}
- Megaselia mediocris Borgmeier, 1967^{c g}
- Megaselia mediocristata Beyer, 1965^{c g}
- Megaselia mediterranea Schmitz, 1935^{c g}
- Megaselia megachaeta Borgmeier, 1971^{c g}
- Megaselia megaglossa Disney, 1982^{c g}
- Megaselia megasetigera Disney, 2003^{c g}
- Megaselia meigeni (Becker, 1901)^{c g}
- Megaselia meijerei (Brues, 1915)^{c g}
- Megaselia melanderi Borgmeier, 1964^{i c g}
- Megaselia melanocephala (Roser, 1840)^{c g}
- Megaselia melanocholica Beyer, 1960^{c g}
- Megaselia melanostola Schmitz, 1942^{c g}
- Megaselia mellea Borgmeier, 1962^{c g}
- Megaselia mendax Borgmeier, 1962^{c g}
- Megaselia mera (Collin, 1912)^{c g}
- Megaselia meracula (Brues, 1911)^{c g}
- Megaselia meridiana Brenner, 2006^{c g}
- Megaselia meridionalis (Brues, 1907)^{c}
- Megaselia meruensis Beyer, 1960^{c g}
- Megaselia mesochaeta Borgmeier, 1962^{c g}
- Megaselia metatarsalis Borgmeier, 1969^{c g}
- Megaselia metropolitanoensis Disney, 2001^{c g}
- Megaselia micantifrons Beyer, 1965^{c g}
- Megaselia michaelis (Schmitz, 1915)^{c g}
- Megaselia michali Disney, 1998^{c g}
- Megaselia microcera Borgmeier, 1962^{c g}
- Megaselia microcurtineura Disney, 1991^{c g}
- Megaselia micronesiae Beyer, 1967^{c g}
- Megaselia miguelensis Disney, 2007^{c g}
- Megaselia mikejohnsoni ^{g}
- Megaselia miki Schmitz, 1929^{c g}
- Megaselia mimica Borgmeier, 1962^{c g}
- Megaselia mimodensior Buck & Disney, 2001^{c g}
- Megaselia miniseta Disney, 1991^{c g}
- Megaselia minor (Zetterstedt, 1848)^{c g}
- Megaselia minuta (Aldrich, 1892)^{i c g}
- Megaselia minutior Borgmeier, 1966^{i c g}
- Megaselia minutussima (Brues, 1905)^{c g}
- Megaselia miripyga Borgmeier, 1967^{c g}
- Megaselia miristigma Borgmeier, 1962^{c g}
- Megaselia mixta (Schmitz, 1918)^{c g}
- Megaselia mixticolor Beyer, 1958^{c g}
- Megaselia moderata Borgmeier, 1967^{c g}
- Megaselia modesta (Brues, 1919)^{i c g}
- Megaselia modica Beyer, 1965^{c g}
- Megaselia modificata Borgmeier, 1962^{c g}
- Megaselia moesta Borgmeier, 1962^{c g}
- Megaselia monochaeta Strobl, 1892^{g}
- Megaselia monochaetina Borgmeier, 1968^{i c g}
- Megaselia montana Schmitz, 1935^{c g}
- Megaselia monticola (Malloch, 1912)^{i c g}
- Megaselia montseniensis Garcia-Romera^{g}
- Megaselia morani Disney, 1982^{c g}
- Megaselia morella Borgmeier, 1967^{c g}
- Megaselia morena Borgmeier, 1962^{c g}
- Megaselia morosa Beyer, 1965^{c g}
- Megaselia mortenseni (Lundbeck, 1920)^{c g}
- Megaselia morula Borgmeier, 1962^{c g}
- Megaselia mountfieldensis Disney, 2003^{c g}
- Megaselia mucronifera Borgmeier, 1967^{c g}
- Megaselia multispinulosa Disney, 2003^{c g}
- Megaselia multivesiculae Disney, 2006^{c g}
- Megaselia munita Borgmeier, 1962^{c g}
- Megaselia murakamii Disney, 1989^{c g}
- Megaselia mutata Brues, 1936^{c g}
- Megaselia mutica Borgmeier, 1962^{c g}
- Megaselia mutilata Borgmeier, 1969^{c g}

=== N ===
- Megaselia naevia Borgmeier, 1962^{c g}
- Megaselia nana (Brues, 1911)^{c g}
- Megaselia nanilla Borgmeier, 1962^{c g}
- Megaselia nantucketensis ^{b}
- Megaselia nasoni (Malloch, 1914)
- Megaselia natalicola Beyer, 1960^{c g}
- Megaselia nebulosa Bridarolli, 1951^{c g}
- Megaselia necmera Disney, 2006^{c g}
- Megaselia necrophaga (Enderlein, 1912)^{c g}
- Megaselia necscabra Disney, 2008^{c g}
- Megaselia nectama Disney, 1991^{c g}
- Megaselia nectergata Disney, 1999^{c g}
- Megaselia nefeloptera Bridarolli, 1951^{c g}
- Megaselia neivai (Bridarolli, 1940)^{c g}
- Megaselia nemorensis (Santos Abreu, 1921)^{c g}
- Megaselia neocorynurae Gonzalez, Brown & Ospina, 2002^{c g}
- Megaselia nepenthina Schmitz, 1955^{c g}
- Megaselia nephelodes Borgmeier, 1962^{c g}
- Megaselia nepos Borgmeier, 1961^{c g}
- Megaselia nesiotica Borgmeier, 1967^{c g}
- Megaselia nestor Borgmeier, 1971^{c g}
- Megaselia nidanurae Disney, 1995^{c g}
- Megaselia nigella Beyer, 1960^{c g}
- Megaselia nigellifrons Borgmeier, 1967^{c g}
- Megaselia nigelloides Borgmeier, 1962^{c g}
- Megaselia nigra (Meigen, 1830)^{i c g}
- Megaselia nigrescens (Wood, 1910)^{c g}
- Megaselia nigribasis Beyer, 1966^{c g}
- Megaselia nigricauda Beyer, 1965^{c g}
- Megaselia nigricens (Wood, 1910)^{g}
- Megaselia nigriceps (Loew, 1866)^{i c g}
- Megaselia nigricia Disney & Durska, 2011
- Megaselia nigriclava (Strobl, 1909)^{c g}
- Megaselia nigricornis Mikhailovskaya, 1991^{c g}
- Megaselia nigricorpus Beyer, 1959^{c g}
- Megaselia nigrifemorata (Santos Abreu, 1921)^{c g}
- Megaselia nigripalpis (Lundbeck, 1920)^{c g}
- Megaselia nigrita Borgmeier, 1962^{c g}
- Megaselia nigritula (Santos Abreu, 1921)^{c g}
- Megaselia nigriventris Bridarolli, 1951^{c g}
- Megaselia nigrofascipes Borgmeier, 1962^{c g}
- Megaselia nitidifrons (Strobl, 1892)^{c g}
- Megaselia nitidipennis Bridarolli, 1951^{c g}
- Megaselia nocturnalis Brues, 1936^{c g}
- Megaselia norica Schmitz, 1929^{c g}
- Megaselia notabilis Beyer, 1965^{c g}
- Megaselia notipennis Borgmeier, 1962^{c g}
- Megaselia nubila Colyer, 1952^{c g}
- Megaselia nubilifurca Borgmeier, 1967^{c g}
- Megaselia nubilipennis Schmitz, 1952^{i c g}
- Megaselia nudihalterata Disney, 2006^{c g}
- Megaselia nudilobulus Disney, 2003^{c g}
- Megaselia nudipalpis Borgmeier, 1962^{c g}
- Megaselia nudipleura (Beyer, 1958)
- Megaselia nussbaumi Disney, 2004^{c g}

=== O ===
- Megaselia oblongifrons Schmitz, 1939^{c g}
- Megaselia obscura (Brues, 1904)^{c g}
- Megaselia obscurata (Enderlein, 1912)^{c g}
- Megaselia obscurella Borgmeier, 1962^{c g}
- Megaselia obscuricauda Beyer, 1966^{c g}
- Megaselia obscuripalpis Borgmeier, 1969^{c g}
- Megaselia obscuripennis (Wood, 1909)^{c g}
- Megaselia obscuriterga Beyer, 1958^{c g}
- Megaselia obscuriventris Bridarolli, 1951^{c g}
- Megaselia ochracea (Brues, 1911)^{c g}
- Megaselia ochreola Borgmeier, 1962^{c g}
- Megaselia ochripes Schmitz, 1953^{c g}
- Megaselia ocilferia Schmitz, 1939^{c g}
- Megaselia ocliferia Schmitz, 1939^{g}
- Megaselia offuscata (Schmitz, 1921)^{c g}
- Megaselia okazakii Disney, 1989^{c g}
- Megaselia oligoseta Disney, 1987^{c g}
- Megaselia onis Mostovski & Disney, 2002^{c g}
- Megaselia opacicornis Schmitz, 1949^{c g}
- Megaselia orbata Borgmeier, 1967^{c g}
- Megaselia orestes Borgmeier, 1966^{i c g}
- Megaselia orgaoa Disney, 1991^{c g}
- Megaselia orientata (Malloch, 1912)^{c g}
- Megaselia orthoneura Borgmeier, 1962^{c g}
- Megaselia ostravaensis Disney, 2008^{c g}
- Megaselia oviaraneae Disney, 1999^{c g}
- Megaselia oweni Disney, 1988^{c g}
- Megaselia oxboroughae ^{g}
- Megaselia oxybelorum Schmitz, 1928^{c g}

=== P ===
- Megaselia pabloi Brown, 1994^{c g}
- Megaselia pachydactyla Schmitz, 1953^{c g}
- Megaselia pagei Disney, 1987^{c g}
- Megaselia pagolacartei Disney, 2012
- Megaselia palaestinensis (Enderlein, 1933)^{c g}
- Megaselia pallicornis (Brunetti, 1912)^{c g}
- Megaselia pallidantennata Beyer, 1960^{c g}
- Megaselia pallidicauda Brues, 1936^{c g}
- Megaselia pallidifemur Borgmeier, 1962^{c g}
- Megaselia pallidipalpis Bridarolli, 1951^{c g}
- Megaselia pallidipennis Borgmeier, 1969^{c g}
- Megaselia pallidivena Borgmeier, 1967^{c g}
- Megaselia pallidizona (Lundbeck, 1920)^{c g}
- Megaselia palmeni (Becker, 1901)^{c g}
- Megaselia palmi Brenner, 2006^{c g}
- Megaselia palpata (Brues, 1919)^{i c g}
- Megaselia palpella Beyer, 1967^{c g}
- Megaselia paludosa (Wood, 1908)^{c g}
- Megaselia pamirica Naumov, 1979^{c g}
- Megaselia pangmaphae Disney, 2006^{c g}
- Megaselia papayae Borgmeier, 1966^{i c g}
- Megaselia papei Disney, 2006^{c g}
- Megaselia parabasiseta Bohart, 1947^{c g}
- Megaselia parachaeta Borgmeier, 1962^{c g}
- Megaselia paraensis Borgmeier, 1971^{c g}
- Megaselia paraprocta Borgmeier, 1964^{i c g}
- Megaselia parasitica (Malloch, 1915)^{c g}
- Megaselia parastigmatica Borgmeier, 1962^{c g}
- Megaselia paricostalis Schmitz, 1929^{c g}
- Megaselia parnassia Disney, 1986^{c g}
- Megaselia parspallida Disney, 2009
- Megaselia parumhirta Beyer, 1965^{c g}
- Megaselia paruminflata Beyer, 1958^{c g}
- Megaselia parumlevata Schmitz, 1936^{c g}
- Megaselia parva (Wood, 1909)^{c g}
- Megaselia parviseta Borgmeier, 1969^{c g}
- Megaselia parvorata Disney, 1991^{c g}
- Megaselia parvula Schmitz, 1930^{c g}
- Megaselia patellata Beyer, 1966^{c g}
- Megaselia patellipes Brues, 1936^{c g}
- Megaselia patellipyga Borgmeier, 1967^{c g}
- Megaselia patula Schmitz, 1936^{c g}
- Megaselia pauculitincta Beyer, 1959^{c g}
- Megaselia paula Borgmeier, 1969^{c g}
- Megaselia paupera (Lundbeck, 1920)^{c g}
- Megaselia paupercula Borgmeier, 1962^{c g}
- Megaselia pauxilla (Brues, 1907)^{c g}
- Megaselia peckorum Disney, 2008^{c g}
- Megaselia pecten Brenner, 2006^{c g}
- Megaselia pectinifera Schmitz, 1926^{c g}
- Megaselia pectoraliformis Colyer, 1962^{c g}
- Megaselia pectoralis (Wood, 1910)^{c g}
- Megaselia pectorella Schmitz, 1929^{c g}
- Megaselia pectunculata Schmitz, 1927^{c g}
- Megaselia pedalis Beyer, 1960^{c g}
- Megaselia pedatella (Schmitz, 1926)^{c g}
- Megaselia pedicellata (Brues, 1924)^{c g}
- Megaselia penicillata (Borgmeier, 1925)^{c}
- Megaselia peniculifera Beyer, 1965^{c g}
- Megaselia pentagonalifrons Beyer, 1965^{c g}
- Megaselia pentagonalis Bridarolli, 1951^{c g}
- Megaselia peraffinis Beyer, 1958^{c g}
- Megaselia percaeca Beyer, 1965^{c g}
- Megaselia perdistans (Schmitz, 1924)^{c g}
- Megaselia perdita (Malloch, 1912)^{i c g}
- Megaselia perfraea Schmitz, 1934^{c g}
- Megaselia perfusca Schmitz, 1935^{c g}
- Megaselia perichaeta Borgmeier, 1964^{i c g}
- Megaselia pernigra (Santos Abreu, 1921)^{c g}
- Megaselia perplexa (Malloch, 1912)^{i c g}
- Megaselia perspicua Borgmeier, 1969^{c g}
- Megaselia perspinosa Brues, 1936^{c g}
- Megaselia pertincta Beyer, 1958^{c g}
- Megaselia perumbrata Brues, 1936^{c g}
- Megaselia peruviana (Brues, 1905)^{c g}
- Megaselia peterseni Disney, 1994^{c g}
- Megaselia petraea Schmitz, 1934^{g}
- Megaselia peyresquensis Delage, 1974^{c g}
- Megaselia phoebe Borgmeier, 1962^{c g}
- Megaselia phoenicura (Schmitz, 1926)^{c g}
- Megaselia piccola Borgmeier, 1966^{i c g}
- Megaselia piceata Borgmeier, 1962^{c g}
- Megaselia picta (Lehmann, 1822)^{i c g}
- Megaselia pictella Beyer, 1965^{c g}
- Megaselia picticolor Beyer, 1958^{c g}
- Megaselia picticornis Borgmeier, 1962^{c g}
- Megaselia pictoides Beyer, 1965^{c g}
- Megaselia pictorufa (Colyer, 1957)
- Megaselia piliclasper Borgmeier, 1971^{c g}
- Megaselia pilicrus Borgmeier, 1964^{i c g}
- Megaselia pilifemur (Lundbeck, 1921)^{c g}
- Megaselia pilifera Brues, 1936^{c g}
- Megaselia pilifrons (Silva Figueroa, 1916)^{c g}
- Megaselia pilipyga Borgmeier, 1964^{i c g}
- Megaselia piliventris Schmitz, 1937^{c g}
- Megaselia pilosella Beyer, 1965^{c g}
- Megaselia pirirostris Borgmeier, 1962^{c g}
- Megaselia pisanoi ^{g}
- Megaselia plagiata Borgmeier, 1962^{c g}
- Megaselia planifrons (Brues, 1905)^{c g}
- Megaselia planipes (Collin, 1912)^{c g}
- Megaselia plaumanni Borgmeier, 1971^{c g}
- Megaselia plebeia (Malloch, 1914)^{i c g}
- Megaselia pleuralis (Wood, 1909)^{i c g}
- Megaselia pleurochaeta Borgmeier, 1969^{c g}
- Megaselia pleurofascia Borgmeier, 1962^{c g}
- Megaselia pleurota Disney, 1994^{c g}
- Megaselia plurispinulosa (Zetterstedt, 1860)^{c g}
- Megaselia plutei Borgmeier, 1971^{c g}
- Megaselia polidorii Disney, 2006^{c g}
- Megaselia polita (Enderlein, 1912)^{c g}
- Megaselia politiceps Borgmeier, 1967^{c g}
- Megaselia politifrons Brues, 1936^{c g}
- Megaselia pollex Schmitz, 1937^{c g}
- Megaselia polonica Disney & Durska, 1999^{c g}
- Megaselia polychaeta Borgmeier, 1967^{c g}
- Megaselia polyporicola Borgmeier, 1966^{i c g}
- Megaselia postcrinata Borgmeier, 1966^{i c g}
- Megaselia posticata (Strobl, 1898)^{c g}
- Megaselia postorta Borgmeier, 1967^{c g}
- Megaselia prachavali Disney, 2006^{c g}
- Megaselia praeacuta (Schmitz, 1919)^{c g}
- Megaselia praedafura Disney, 1997^{c g}
- Megaselia praefulgens Beyer, 1965^{c g}
- Megaselia praeminens Beyer, 1965^{c g}
- Megaselia pressicauda Borgmeier, 1964^{i c g}
- Megaselia pressifrons Schmitz, 1929^{c g}
- Megaselia pristina Borgmeier, 1962^{c g}
- Megaselia privata Borgmeier, 1967^{c g}
- Megaselia procera Borgmeier, 1966^{i c g}
- Megaselia proclinata Borgmeier, 1964^{i c g}
- Megaselia prodroma (Lundbeck, 1921)^{c g}
- Megaselia producta (Schmitz, 1921)^{c g}
- Megaselia prolixa Borgmeier, 1958^{c g}
- Megaselia prolixifurca Kung & Brown, 2004^{c g}
- Megaselia prolongata Schmitz, 1954^{c g}
- Megaselia propinqua (Wood, 1909)^{c g}
- Megaselia propior Colyer, 1956^{c g}
- Megaselia prosthioxantha (Enderlein, 1912)^{c g}
- Megaselia protarsalis Schmitz, 1927^{c g}
- Megaselia protarsella Beyer, 1965^{c g}
- Megaselia pruinosa (Malloch, 1914)^{c g}
- Megaselia pruinosifrons Borgmeier, 1962^{c g}
- Megaselia pseudociliata (Strobl, 1910)^{c g}
- Megaselia pseudogiraudii (Schmitz, 1920)^{c g}
- Megaselia pseudomera Disney, 2006^{c g}
- Megaselia pseudopicta (Lundbeck, 1922)^{c g}
- Megaselia pseudoscalaris (Senior-White, 1924)^{c g}
- Megaselia pteryacantha (Borgmeier, 1925)^{c g}
- Megaselia pubecula Schmitz, 1927^{c g}
- Megaselia pulcherrima (Santos Abreu, 1921)^{c g}
- Megaselia pulicaria (Fallen, 1823)^{i c g}
- Megaselia pulicaripar Beyer, 1959^{c g}
- Megaselia pulla (Brues, 1919)^{i c g}
- Megaselia pulliclava Borgmeier, 1969^{c g}
- Megaselia pullifrons Beyer, 1958^{c g}
- Megaselia pullipalpis Colyer, 1962^{c g}
- Megaselia pulveroboleti Disney, 1998^{c g}
- Megaselia pumila (Meigen, 1830)^{c g}
- Megaselia punctata Bridarolli, 1951^{c g}
- Megaselia punctifrons Borgmeier, 1969^{c g}
- Megaselia punctipes Borgmeier, 1962^{c g}
- Megaselia purificata Borgmeier, 1967^{c g}
- Megaselia pusilla (Meigen, 1830)^{i c g}
- Megaselia putescavi Disney, 2011^{g}
- Megaselia pygidialis Beyer, 1965^{c g}
- Megaselia pygmaea (Zetterstedt, 1848)^{c g}
- Megaselia pygmaeoides (Lundbeck, 1921)^{i c g}
- Megaselia pygmaeola Borgmeier, 1966^{i c g}

=== Q ===
- Megaselia quadrata Brues, 1936^{c g}
- Megaselia quadribrevis Disney, 2003^{c g}
- Megaselia quadripunctata (Malloch, 1918)^{i c g}
- Megaselia quadriseta Schmitz, 1918^{c g}
- Megaselia quadrispinosa Brues, 1936^{c g}
- Megaselia quadrupliciseta Bridarolli, 1951^{c g}
- Megaselia quartobrevis Beyer, 1965^{c g}
- Megaselia quartobsoleta Borgmeier, 1969^{c g}
- Megaselia quartocurta Borgmeier, 1969^{c g}
- Megaselia quartolutea Borgmeier, 1963^{c g}
- Megaselia quartopallida Beyer, 1965^{c g}
- Megaselia quattuorbrevis Disney, 2008^{c g}
- Megaselia quintincisa Disney, 2006^{c g}

=== R ===
- Megaselia raetica Schmitz, 1934^{c g}
- Megaselia ramierzi Bridarolli, 1951^{c g}
- Megaselia rara Colyer, 1962^{c g}
- Megaselia raruvesiculae Buck & Disney, 2001^{c g}
- Megaselia recta (Brues, 1911)^{c g}
- Megaselia rectangulata (Malloch, 1914)^{c}
- Megaselia reducta Borgmeier, 1966^{i c g}
- Megaselia relicta Borgmeier, 1964^{i c g}
- Megaselia renata Borgmeier, 1964^{i c g}
- Megaselia renwickorum ^{g}
- Megaselia repetenda Brues, 1936^{c g}
- Megaselia retardata (Malloch, 1912)^{i c g}
- Megaselia rettenmeyeri Disney, 2007^{c g}
- Megaselia reversa Brues, 1936^{c g}
- Megaselia reynoldsi Disney, 1981^{c g}
- Megaselia rhabdopalpis Borgmeier, 1962^{c g}
- Megaselia richardsoni Disney, 2003^{c g}
- Megaselia riefi Brenner, 2006^{c g}
- Megaselia rimacensis Brues, 1944^{c g}
- Megaselia rivalis (Wood, 1909)^{c g}
- Megaselia robertsoni Disney, 2008^{c g}
- Megaselia robinsoni Disney, 1981^{c g}
- Megaselia robusta Schmitz, 1928^{i c g}
- Megaselia rodriguezorum ^{g}
- Megaselia romeralensis Disney, 2009
- Megaselia romphaea (Schmitz, 1947)
- Megaselia rotunda Robinson, 1981^{i c g}
- Megaselia rotundapicis Disney, 1999^{c g}
- Megaselia rotundicauda Beyer, 1965^{c g}
- Megaselia rotundula Borgmeier, 1966^{i c g}
- Megaselia rubella (Schmitz, 1920)^{c g}
- Megaselia rubescens (Wood, 1912)^{c g}
- Megaselia rubicornis (Schmitz, 1919)^{c g}
- Megaselia rubida (Schmitz, 1918)^{c g}
- Megaselia rubricornis (Schmitz, 1919)^{g}
- Megaselia rubronigra Borgmeier, 1962^{c g}
- Megaselia rudimentalis Borgmeier, 1962^{c g}
- Megaselia rudis (Wood, 1909)^{c g}
- Megaselia rufa (Wood, 1908)^{c g}
- Megaselia ruficornis (Meigen, 1830)^{i c g}
- Megaselia rufifrons (Wood, 1910)^{c g}
- Megaselia rufipennis (Macquart, 1835)^{c g}
- Megaselia rufipes (Meigen, 1804)^{i c g b} (coffin fly)
- Megaselia rupestris Schmitz, 1934^{c g}
- Megaselia ruralis Schmitz, 1937^{c g}
- Megaselia russellensis Disney, 2003^{c g}
- Megaselia rustica (Brues, 1905)^{c g}
- Megaselia rutilipes Beyer, 1958^{c g}

=== S ===
- Megaselia sacatelensis ^{g}
- Megaselia sacculata Borgmeier, 1958^{c g}
- Megaselia sacculifera Beyer, 1965^{c g}
- Megaselia safuneae Malloch, 1935^{c g}
- Megaselia sakaiae Disney, 2001^{c g}
- Megaselia samoana Borgmeier, 1967^{c g}
- Megaselia sandhui Disney, 1981^{c g}
- Megaselia sanguinea (Schmitz, 1922)^{c g}
- Megaselia saprophaga Borgmeier, 1934^{c g}
- Megaselia sarae Garcia-Romera^{g}
- Megaselia sauteri (Brues, 1911)^{c g}
- Megaselia savannae Disney, 1991^{c g}
- Megaselia scabra Schmitz, 1926^{c g}
- Megaselia scalaris (Loew, 1866)^{i c g b}
- Megaselia schildi Borgmeier, 1971^{c g}
- Megaselia schutti Schmitz, 1936^{c g}
- Megaselia schwarzi (Malloch, 1912)^{i c g}
- Megaselia sciaricida Schmitz, 1932^{c g}
- Megaselia scissa Borgmeier, 1962^{c g}
- Megaselia scopalis (Brues, 1919)^{i c g}
- Megaselia scopifera Brues, 1936^{c g}
- Megaselia scutellariformis Schmitz, 1926^{c g}
- Megaselia scutellaris (Wood, 1909)^{c g}
- Megaselia scutelliseta Borgmeier, 1935^{c g}
- Megaselia seaverorum ^{g}
- Megaselia seclusa Beyer, 1966^{i c g}
- Megaselia secreta Beyer, 1958^{c g}
- Megaselia sejuncta Beyer, 1967^{c g}
- Megaselia sembeli Disney, 1986^{c g}
- Megaselia semicrocea Borgmeier, 1964^{i c g}
- Megaselia semiferruginea Bridarolli, 1940^{c g}
- Megaselia semihyalina Beyer, 1960^{c g}
- Megaselia semilucens Borgmeier, 1967^{c g}
- Megaselia semilutea Borgmeier, 1962^{c g}
- Megaselia semimollis Borgmeier, 1971^{c g}
- Megaselia semipolita Borgmeier, 1961^{c g}
- Megaselia semota Beyer, 1959^{c g}
- Megaselia senegalensis Disney, 1980^{c g}
- Megaselia septentrionalis (Schmitz, 1919)^{c g}
- Megaselia sepulchralis (Lundbeck, 1920)^{c g}
- Megaselia sericata Schmitz, 1935^{c g}
- Megaselia serotina Borgmeier, 1962^{c g}
- Megaselia serpentina Borgmeier, 1962^{c g}
- Megaselia serrata (Wood, 1910)^{c g}
- Megaselia setacea (Aldrich, 1892)^{i c g}
- Megaselia setalis Beyer, 1958^{c g}
- Megaselia setaria (Malloch)^{i c g}
- Megaselia setella Beyer, 1966^{c g}
- Megaselia seticauda (Malloch, 1914)^{i c g}
- Megaselia seticerca Borgmeier, 1966^{i c g}
- Megaselia seticlasper Borgmeier, 1962^{c g}
- Megaselia seticosta Borgmeier, 1962^{c g}
- Megaselia setifemur Bohart, 1947^{c g}
- Megaselia setifer (Lundbeck, 1920)^{c g}
- Megaselia setifimbria Borgmeier, 1971^{c g}
- Megaselia setifrons Brues, 1936^{c g}
- Megaselia setigera (Brues, 1919)^{c g}
- Megaselia setimargo (Enderlein, 1912)^{c g}
- Megaselia setipectus Borgmeier, 1971^{c g}
- Megaselia setipennis Borgmeier, 1967^{c g}
- Megaselia setiventris Borgmeier, 1962^{c g}
- Megaselia setulipalpis Schmitz, 1938^{c g}
- Megaselia sevciki Disney, 2006^{c g}
- Megaselia sexcrinata Borgmeier, 1962^{c g}
- Megaselia sextaperta Beyer, 1958^{c g}
- Megaselia sextobsoleta Borgmeier, 1971^{c g}
- Megaselia sextohirta Beyer, 1966^{c g}
- Megaselia sextolutea Borgmeier, 1967^{c g}
- Megaselia sextovittata Lee & Disney, 2004^{c g}
- Megaselia seychellesensis Disney, 2006^{c g}
- Megaselia shannoni Borgmeier, 1966^{i c g}
- Megaselia shawi Disney, 2006^{c g}
- Megaselia sheppardi Disney, 1988^{c g}
- Megaselia shiyiluae Disney, Li & Li, 1995^{c g}
- Megaselia siamensis Beyer, 1966^{c g}
- Megaselia sibulanensis Brues, 1936^{c g}
- Megaselia sibylla Borgmeier, 1967^{c g}
- Megaselia sicaria (Colyer, 1962)^{c g}
- Megaselia sidneyae ^{g}
- Megaselia signabilis Beyer, 1965^{c g}
- Megaselia sihlwaldensis Rondani, 1856^{g}
- Megaselia silhouettensis Disney, 2005^{c g}
- Megaselia similifrons Schmitz, 1934^{c g}
- Megaselia similis (Silva Figueroa, 1916)^{c g}
- Megaselia simiola Borgmeier, 1966^{i c g}
- Megaselia simplex (Wood, 1910)^{c g}
- Megaselia simplicior (Brues, 1924)^{c g}
- Megaselia simulans (Wood, 1912)^{c g}
- Megaselia sinefurca Borgmeier, 1962^{c g}
- Megaselia sinuata Schmitz, 1926^{c g}
- Megaselia sinuosimargo Borgmeier, 1962^{c g}
- Megaselia smirnovi Naumov, 1979^{c g}
- Megaselia sobria Borgmeier, 1967^{c g}
- Megaselia socia Borgmeier, 1962^{c g}
- Megaselia sodalis (Brues, 1905)^{c g}
- Megaselia sokotrana Beyer, 1965^{c g}
- Megaselia solita Beyer, 1958^{c g}
- Megaselia solitaria Schmitz, 1934
- Megaselia soluta (Collin, 1912)^{c g}
- Megaselia sordescens Schmitz, 1927^{i c g}
- Megaselia sordida (Zetterstedt, 1838)^{i c g}
- Megaselia sororpusilla Disney, 2012
- Megaselia southwoodi Disney, 1982^{c g}
- Megaselia specularis Schmitz, 1935^{c g}
- Megaselia speculifera Beyer, 1965^{c g}
- Megaselia speculigera Borgmeier, 1962^{c g}
- Megaselia speiseri Schmitz, 1929^{c g}
- Megaselia spelophila Borgmeier, 1966^{i c g}
- Megaselia spelunciphila Disney, 1999^{c g}
- Megaselia sphinx Borgmeier, 1962^{i c g}
- Megaselia spiculata Borgmeier, 1969^{c g}
- Megaselia spinata (Wood, 1910)^{c g}
- Megaselia spinicincta (Wood, 1910)^{c g}
- Megaselia spiniclasper Borgmeier, 1964^{i c g}
- Megaselia spinigera (Wood, 1908)^{c g}
- Megaselia spinipectus Borgmeier, 1971^{c g}
- Megaselia spinipleura (Borgmeier, 1924)^{c}
- Megaselia spinolabella Disney, 1989^{c g}
- Megaselia spinulata Borgmeier, 1964^{i c g}
- Megaselia spiracularis Schmitz, 1938^{c g}
- Megaselia splendens Borgmeier, 1967^{c g}
- Megaselia splendescens Beyer, 1965^{c g}
- Megaselia spodiaca (Schmitz, 1926)^{c g}
- Megaselia spoliata Borgmeier, 1967^{c g}
- Megaselia spreta (Collin, 1912)^{c g}
- Megaselia stackelbergi Mostovski & Disney, 2003^{c g}
- Megaselia stenoterga Disney, 1988^{c g}
- Megaselia stephanoidea (Borgmeier, 1925)^{c g}
- Megaselia steptoeae ^{g}
- Megaselia stichata (Lundbeck, 1920)^{c g}
- Megaselia stigmatica (Schmitz, 1920)^{c g}
- Megaselia stimulata Borgmeier, 1962^{c g}
- Megaselia straminipes (Malloch, 1912)^{i}
- Megaselia striativentris Borgmeier, 1962^{c g}
- Megaselia stricta Borgmeier, 1962^{c g}
- Megaselia striolata Schmitz, 1940^{c g}
- Megaselia styloprocta (Schmitz, 1921)^{c g}
- Megaselia suates Brenner, 2004^{c g}
- Megaselia subalpina Brenner, 2004^{c g}
- Megaselia subaristalis Borgmeier, 1969^{c g}
- Megaselia subatomella (Malloch, 1912)^{c g}
- Megaselia subcarinata Borgmeier, 1962^{c g}
- Megaselia subcarpalis (Lundbeck, 1920)^{c g}
- Megaselia subcavata Borgmeier, 1964^{i c g}
- Megaselia subcavifrons Borgmeier, 1971^{c g}
- Megaselia subconvexa (Lundbeck, 1920)^{c g}
- Megaselia subcrinosa Borgmeier, 1962^{c g}
- Megaselia subcrocea Borgmeier, 1967^{c g}
- Megaselia subcuneata Borgmeier, 1962^{c g}
- Megaselia subflava (Malloch, 1912)^{c g}
- Megaselia subfraudulenta Schmitz, 1933^{c g}
- Megaselia subfuscipes Schmitz, 1935^{c g}
- Megaselia subinflata Borgmeier, 1969^{c g}
- Megaselia sublutea (Malloch, 1912)^{i c g}
- Megaselia submarginalis (Malloch, 1912)^{i c g}
- Megaselia submimica Borgmeier, 1969^{c g}
- Megaselia subnitida Lundbeck^{g}
- Megaselia subnudifemur Borgmeier, 1964^{i c g}
- Megaselia subnudipennis (Schmitz, 1919)^{c g}
- Megaselia subnudiseta Beyer, 1958^{c g}
- Megaselia subobscurata (Malloch, 1912)^{i c g}
- Megaselia subpalpalis (Lundbeck, 1920)^{c g}
- Megaselia subpicta (Malloch, 1912)^{i c g}
- Megaselia subpleuralis (Wood, 1909)^{i c g}
- Megaselia subpyricornis Beyer, 1959^{c g}
- Megaselia subrecta Borgmeier, 1967^{c g}
- Megaselia subscaura Schmitz, 1932^{c g}
- Megaselia subsetella Borgmeier, 1967^{c g}
- Megaselia substricta Borgmeier, 1969^{c g}
- Megaselia subtumida (Wood, 1909)^{c g}
- Megaselia subulicauda Schmitz, 1929^{c g}
- Megaselia subvittata Borgmeier, 1967^{c g}
- Megaselia suis Bohart, 1947^{c g}
- Megaselia sulcatifrons Borgmeier, 1967^{c g}
- Megaselia sulfurella Schmitz, 1926^{c g}
- Megaselia sulina Borgmeier, 1962^{c g}
- Megaselia sullivani Disney, 2003^{c g}
- Megaselia sulphurea Borgmeier, 1971^{c g}
- Megaselia sulphuripes (Meigen, 1830)^{c g}
- Megaselia sulphuriventris (Borgmeier & Schmitz, 1923)^{c g}
- Megaselia sulphurizona Borgmeier, 1966^{i c g}
- Megaselia superans Borgmeier, 1958^{c g}
- Megaselia supercilata (Wood, 1910)^{c g}
- Megaselia superciliata (Wood, 1910)^{g}
- Megaselia superfurcata Schmitz, 1928^{c g}
- Megaselia superpilosa Bridarolli, 1951^{c g}
- Megaselia supina Borgmeier, 1958^{c g}
- Megaselia surdifrons (Wood, 1909)^{c g}
- Megaselia surophila Disney, 1991^{c g}
- Megaselia suspicata Borgmeier, 1967^{c g}
- Megaselia sylvatica (Wood, 1910)^{c g}
- Megaselia sylvicola (Malloch, 1914)^{c g}
- Megaselia symondsi Disney, 2002^{c g}

=== T ===
- Megaselia tabida Colyer, 1956^{c g}
- Megaselia tama (Schmitz, 1926)^{c g}
- Megaselia tamanae Disney, 1995^{c g}
- Megaselia tamilnaduensis Disney, 1995^{c g}
- Megaselia tamoides Borgmeier, 1964^{i c g}
- Megaselia tanypalpis Kung & Brown, 2004^{c g}
- Megaselia tarsalis (Wood, 1910)^{c g}
- Megaselia tarsella (Lundbeck, 1921)^{c g}
- Megaselia tarsicia Schmitz, 1926^{c g}
- Megaselia tarsodes Borgmeier, 1969^{c g}
- Megaselia tasmaniensis (Malloch, 1912)^{c g}
- Megaselia tecticauda Borgmeier, 1964^{i c g}
- Megaselia tedersooi Disney in Disney, Kurina, Tedersoo & Cakpo, 2013
- Megaselia tenebricior Beyer, 1967^{c g}
- Megaselia tenebricola Schmitz, 1934^{c g}
- Megaselia tenericoma Beyer, 1965^{c g}
- Megaselia teneripes Schmitz, 1957^{c g}
- Megaselia tenuibasis Beyer, 1960^{c g}
- Megaselia tenuicoma Beyer, 1960^{c g}
- Megaselia tenuicosta Beyer, 1965^{c g}
- Megaselia tenuiventris Schmitz, 1927^{c g}
- Megaselia teresamajewskae Disney, 1998^{c g}
- Megaselia tergalis Beyer, 1958^{c g}
- Megaselia tergata (Lundbeck, 1920)^{c g}
- Megaselia tergatula Beyer, 1965^{c g}
- Megaselia tergitalis Borgmeier, 1961^{c g}
- Megaselia termimycana Disney, 1996^{c g}
- Megaselia termitomyca Disney, 1989^{c g}
- Megaselia termitomycana Disney, 1966^{g}
- Megaselia testacea Schmitz, 1938^{c g}
- Megaselia testaceicornis Borgmeier, 1967^{c g}
- Megaselia tetrabrevis Disney, 2003^{c g}
- Megaselia tetrachaeta Beyer, 1966^{c g}
- Megaselia tetraseta Disney, 2007^{c g}
- Megaselia tetrica Borgmeier, 1964^{i c g}
- Megaselia tetricifrons Beyer, 1967^{c g}
- Megaselia teutoniae Disney, 1989^{c g}
- Megaselia textilis Brues, 1936^{c g}
- Megaselia thaleri Brenner, 2006^{c g}
- Megaselia thalhammeri Schmitz, 1935^{c g}
- Megaselia tiagoensis Disney, 1991^{c g}
- Megaselia tibialis (Brues, 1905)^{c g}
- Megaselia tibiella (Lundbeck, 1920)^{c g}
- Megaselia tignorum Disney, 2009
- Megaselia tinctipennis Brues, 1936^{c g}
- Megaselia tinglei Disney, 1991^{c g}
- Megaselia tinteri Disney, 1998^{c g}
- Megaselia tomatoae Woolf, 1996^{c g}
- Megaselia tomskensis Naumov, 1992^{c g}
- Megaselia tonsipalpis Beyer, 1965^{c g}
- Megaselia tonyirwini Disney, 1988^{c g}
- Megaselia torautensis Disney, 1990^{c g}
- Megaselia totaflava Borgmeier, 1969^{c g}
- Megaselia totanigra Beyer, 1959^{c g}
- Megaselia transcarinata Borgmeier, 1971^{c g}
- Megaselia translocata Brues, 1936^{c g}
- Megaselia translucida Bridarolli, 1951^{c g}
- Megaselia transversalis De Meijere, 1929^{g}
- Megaselia transversiseta Bridarolli, 1951^{c g}
- Megaselia triapitsyni Michailovskaya, 2003^{c g}
- Megaselia trichopleurophora Beyer, 1960^{c g}
- Megaselia trichorrhoea (Schmitz, 1921)^{c g}
- Megaselia trilineata (Brunetti, 1912)^{c g}
- Megaselia trimacula ^{g}
- Megaselia tripartita Borgmeier, 1961^{c g}
- Megaselia triplicicristae Disney, 2003^{c g}
- Megaselia tripliciseta Bridarolli, 1951^{c g}
- Megaselia triquetra Schmitz, 1927^{c g}
- Megaselia trisecta Brues, 1936^{c g}
- Megaselia tristis (Borgmeier, 1963)^{i c g}
- Megaselia tritomegas Borgmeier, 1967^{c g}
- Megaselia trivialis (Brues, 1911)^{c g}
- Megaselia trochanteralis Schmitz, 1953^{c g}
- Megaselia trochanterica Schmitz, 1926^{c g}
- Megaselia trochimczuki Disney & Durska, 2011
- Megaselia trogeri Brenner, 2006^{c g}
- Megaselia troglodytica Schmitz, 1950^{c g}
- Megaselia trojani Disney, 1998^{c g}
- Megaselia trudiae Disney, 2003^{c g}
- Megaselia tubulifera Borgmeier, 1962^{c g}
- Megaselia tubuliventris Bridarolli, 1951^{c g}
- Megaselia tulearensis Disney, 2005^{c g}
- Megaselia tumida (Wood, 1909)^{c g}
- Megaselia tumidicornis Borgmeier, 1962^{c g}
- Megaselia tumidicosta Borgmeier, 1962^{c g}
- Megaselia tumidilla Borgmeier, 1962^{c g}
- Megaselia tumidirostris Borgmeier, 1969^{c g}
- Megaselia tumidula Borgmeier, 1962^{c g}
- Megaselia tumipalpis Bridarolli, 1951^{c g}
- Megaselia turbata Borgmeier, 1967^{c g}
- Megaselia turbidipennis Borgmeier, 1967^{c g}
- Megaselia turgida (Borgmeier, 1925)^{c}
- Megaselia turgidilla Borgmeier, 1967^{c g}
- Megaselia turgipes Borgmeier, 1967^{c g}
- Megaselia tweedensis Disney, 2008^{c g}

=== U-V ===
- Megaselia uliginosa (Wood, 1909)^{c g}
- Megaselia ultrabrevis Schmitz, 1927
- Megaselia umbrata Schmitz, 1936^{c g}
- Megaselia umbrosa Brues, 1936^{c g}
- Megaselia undulans Schmitz, 1940^{c g}
- Megaselia unguicularis (Wood, 1909)^{c g}
- Megaselia ungulata Robinson, 1981^{i c g}
- Megaselia unichaeta Colyer, 1962^{c g}
- Megaselia unicolor (Schmitz, 1919)^{c g}
- Megaselia unisetosa Brues, 1936^{c g}
- Megaselia unwini Disney, 1987^{c g}
- Megaselia ursina (Malloch, 1912)^{i c g}
- Megaselia ussuriensis Mikhailovskaya, 1987^{c g}
- Megaselia usticlava Borgmeier, 1967^{c g}
- Megaselia ustipennis Borgmeier, 1967^{c g}
- Megaselia ustulata (Schmitz, 1920)^{c g}
- Megaselia ustulithorax Beyer, 1965^{c g}
- Megaselia utingensis Borgmeier, 1971^{c g}
- Megaselia valida (Santos Abreu, 1921)^{c g}
- Megaselia valvata Schmitz, 1935^{c g}
- Megaselia vannusetarum Disney, 2006^{c g}
- Megaselia vapidicornis Brues, 1936^{c g}
- Megaselia variana Schmitz, 1926^{c g}
- Megaselia variegata Schmitz, 1937^{c g}
- Megaselia venalis Beyer, 1966^{c g}
- Megaselia ventralis Borgmeier, 1963^{i c g}
- Megaselia verdensis Disney, 1991^{c g}
- Megaselia verna Schmitz, 1932^{c g}
- Megaselia vernalis (Wood, 1909)^{c g}
- Megaselia vernicosa Beyer, 1966^{c g}
- Megaselia vernicosior Beyer, 1966^{c g}
- Megaselia verralli (Wood, 1910)^{c g}
- Megaselia versicolor Borgmeier, 1967^{c g}
- Megaselia vespertilionis Borgmeier, 1962^{c g}
- Megaselia vestita (Wood, 1914)^{c g}
- Megaselia victorovi Mikhailovskaya, 1991^{c g}
- Megaselia viduata (Collin, 1912)^{c g}
- Megaselia villicauda Schmitz, 1927^{c g}
- Megaselia villosa Michailovskaya, 2003^{c g}
- Megaselia vinculata Borgmeier, 1964^{i c g}
- Megaselia violata Borgmeier, 1969^{c g}
- Megaselia virescens Bridarolli, 1951^{c g}
- Megaselia virilis (Schmitz, 1919)^{c g}
- Megaselia vitiomera Disney, 2006^{c g}
- Megaselia vittata Borgmeier, 1967^{c g}
- Megaselia vorata Disney, 1991^{c g}
- Megaselia vulcanica Bridarolli, 1951^{c g}

=== W-Z ===
- Megaselia waagei Schmitz, 1935^{c g}
- Megaselia weissflogi Disney, 1998^{c g}
- Megaselia wellingtonensis Disney, 2003^{c g}
- Megaselia wheeleri Borgmeier, 1967^{c g}
- Megaselia wickenensis Disney, 2000^{c g}
- Megaselia wiegmanae ^{g}
- Megaselia wigtownensis Disney, 2009
- Megaselia winnemana (Malloch, 1912)^{i c g}
- Megaselia winqvisti Disney, 2011
- Megaselia withersi Disney, 2008^{c g}
- Megaselia woodi (Lundbeck, 1922)^{c g}
- Megaselia wuzhiensis Fang, 2005^{c g}
- Megaselia xanthocera Borgmeier, 1967^{c g}
- Megaselia xanthogastra Schmitz, 1940^{c g}
- Megaselia xanthophila Buck & Disney, 2001^{c g}
- Megaselia xanthopus Beyer, 1965^{c g}
- Megaselia xanthopyge Beyer, 1965^{c g}
- Megaselia xanthozona (Strobl, 1892)^{c g}
- Megaselia yatesi Disney, 2002^{c g}
- Megaselia zaitzevi Michailovskaya, 1991^{c g}
- Megaselia zariaensis Disney, 1989^{c g}
- Megaselia zebrina Beyer, 1964^{i c g}
- Megaselia zeno Borgmeier, 1962^{c g}
- Megaselia zeuzerae Disney, 1997^{c g}
- Megaselia zonata (Zetterstedt, 1838)^{c g}

Data sources: i = ITIS, c = Catalogue of Life, g = GBIF, b = Bugguide.net
