= Megaselia nigra =

Scientific classification
- Domain: Eukaryota
- Kingdom: Animalia
- Phylum: Arthropoda
- Class: Insecta
- Order: Diptera
- Family: Phoridae
- Genus: Megaselia
- Species: M. nigra

Binomial name
- Megaselia nigra Meigen, 1830

Species of fly

Megaselia nigra is a species of scuttle fly (also called hump-backed flies) in the family Phoridae. Megaselia species are common pests of mushroom cultivation, attracted by the aroma of developing fungal mycelium. The larvae feed on the developing mycelium of the mushroom, ultimately damaging both the mycelium and gill tissues.

Megaselia nigra can be infected by the symbiotic bacteria Spiroplasma, which may protect its fly host from attack by parasites.

== See also ==
- Megaselia halterata
- Megaselia scalaris
