= Megaselia llanquihuea =

Scientific classification
- Kingdom: Animalia
- Phylum: Arthropoda
- Class: Insecta
- Order: Diptera
- Family: Phoridae
- Genus: Megaselia
- Species: M. llanquihuea

Binomial name
- Megaselia llanquihuea Schmitz, 1929

Species of scuttle fly

Megaselia llanquihuea is a species of fly in the family Phoridae. The species is endemic to Chile.
