= Megaselia halterata =

Scientific classification
- Kingdom: Animalia
- Phylum: Arthropoda
- Class: Insecta
- Order: Diptera
- Family: Phoridae
- Genus: Megaselia
- Species: M. halterata

Binomial name
- Megaselia halterata (Wood, 1910)

Species of fly

The mushroom phorid fly (Megaselia halterata) is a species of scuttle fly or hump-backed flies in the family Phoridae. "The mushroom phorid" is also used to refer to M. halterata. Megaselia halterata is a common pest of mushroom cultivation, attracted by the aroma of developing fungal mycelium. The larvae damage both the mushroom mycelium and gill tissues. Megaslia halterata can be found worldwide.

Megaselia halterata is an important pest of mushroom cultivation, capable of severely limiting mushroom yield. Megaselia are naturally infected by Howardula nematodes, however entomopathogenic nematodes do not readily control M. halterata.

== Physical appearance ==
Adult mushroom phorid flies are 2-3mm in length with a blackish-brown color. Their antennae are short, with only three segments. Belonging to the "Hump-backed flies" (Phoridae), they have a prominent-looking back side

== See also ==
- Megaselia scalaris, a related species used in forensic entomology
