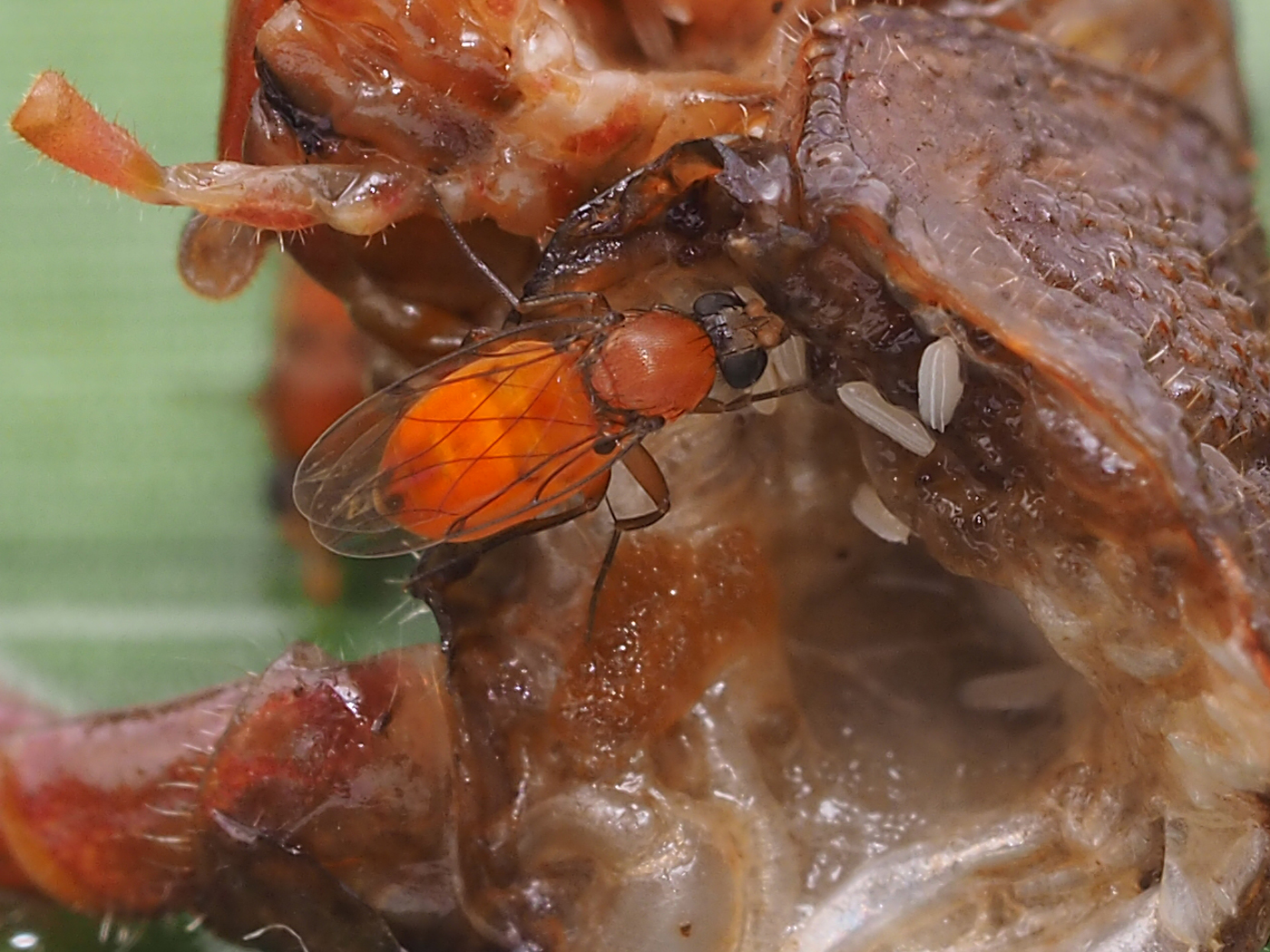

Scientific classification
- Kingdom: Animalia
- Phylum: Arthropoda
- Class: Insecta
- Order: Diptera
- Family: Phoridae
- Genus: Megaselia
- Species: M. aurea

Binomial name
- Megaselia aurea (Aldrich, 1896)

Synonyms
- Phora aurea Aldrich, 1896

= Megaselia aurea =

Species of fly

== Overview ==
Megaselia aurea is a species of scuttle flies (insects in the family Phoridae).

== Biology ==
Megaselia aurea is a very small fly, only about 1–3 millimeters long. Like other phorid flies, it has a noticeable hump on its back. Instead of flying for long distances, these flies often move by making quick, short runs, this is why they're called "scuttle flies." The larvae usually grow in damp, decaying plants or animal material, feeding on it as they develop. Female M. aurea have been seen gathering together in groups on leaves, which is part of their mating behavior. The Megaselia group is one of the most diverse in the world, with thousands of species already named and many more that scientists are still discovering.
