= Megaselia globipyga =

Scientific classification
- Domain: Eukaryota
- Kingdom: Animalia
- Phylum: Arthropoda
- Class: Insecta
- Order: Diptera
- Family: Phoridae
- Genus: Megaselia
- Species: M. globipyga

Binomial name
- Megaselia globipyga Borgmeier, 1966

Species of fly

Megaselia globipyga is a species of scuttle flies (insects in the family Phoridae).
