= Megaselia rufipes =

Scientific classification
- Kingdom: Animalia
- Phylum: Arthropoda
- Class: Insecta
- Order: Diptera
- Family: Phoridae
- Genus: Megaselia
- Species: M. rufipes

Binomial name
- Megaselia rufipes (Meigen, 1804)

Synonyms
- Trineura rufipes Meigen, 1804

Species of fly

Megaselia rufipes, the coffin fly, is a species of scuttle flies (insects in the family Phoridae).
