= William Lundbeck =

Danish entomologist (1863–1941)

William Lundbeck (16 October 1863 in Aalborg – 18 May 1941 in Kongens Lyngby) was a Danish entomologist mainly interested in Diptera. He was a professor in the University Museum in Copenhagen. Lundbeck's most important work was Diptera Danica. Genera and species of flies Hitherto found in Denmark. Copenhagen & London, 1902–1927. 7 vols.

The Parts of this work are

- 1907. Stratiomyidae, Xylophagidae, Coenomyiidae, Tabanidae, Leptididae, Acroceridae. Diptera Danica 1. Copenhagen.
- 1908. Asilidae, Bombyliidae, Therevidae, Scenopinidae. Diptera Danica 2. Copenhagen.
- 1910. Empididae. Diptera Danica 3. Copenhagen.
- 1912. Dolichopodidae. Diptera Danica 4. Copenhagen.
- 1916. Lonchopteridae, Syrphidae. Diptera Danica 5. Copenhagen.
- 1922. Pipunculidae, Phoridae. Diptera Danica 6. Copenhagen.
- 1927. Platypezidae, Tachinidae. Diptera Danica 7. Copenhagen.

Before turning to insects, however, he participated on the Ingolf expedition to the North Atlantic in 1895-1896 and produced three significant reports on the deep sea porifera collected by the expedition.

== Collection ==
Lundbeck's insect collection is in The Zoological Museum, University of Copenhagen (Zoologisk Museum, Københavns Universitet).

== Sources ==
- Evenhuis, N. L. 1997: Litteratura taxonomica dipterorum (1758–1930). Volume 1 (A-K); Volume 2 (L-Z). - Leiden, Backhuys Publishers 1; 2 VII+1-426; 427–871
- Heller, W. 1943: [Lundbeck, W.] - Notulae Ent. 23 60
