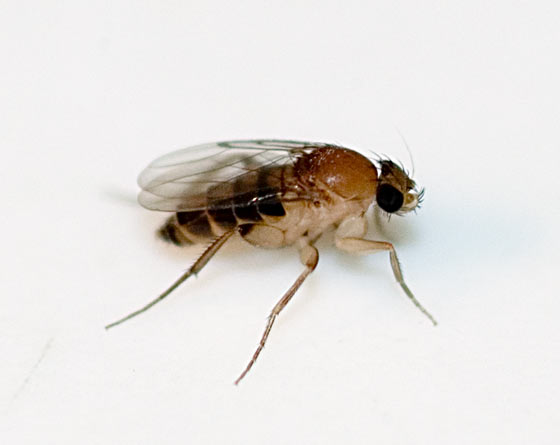

Scientific classification
- Kingdom: Animalia
- Phylum: Arthropoda
- Clade: Pancrustacea
- Class: Insecta
- Order: Diptera
- Family: Phoridae
- Genus: Megaselia
- Species: M. scalaris

Binomial name
- Megaselia scalaris (Loew, 1866)

= Megaselia scalaris =

Species of fly

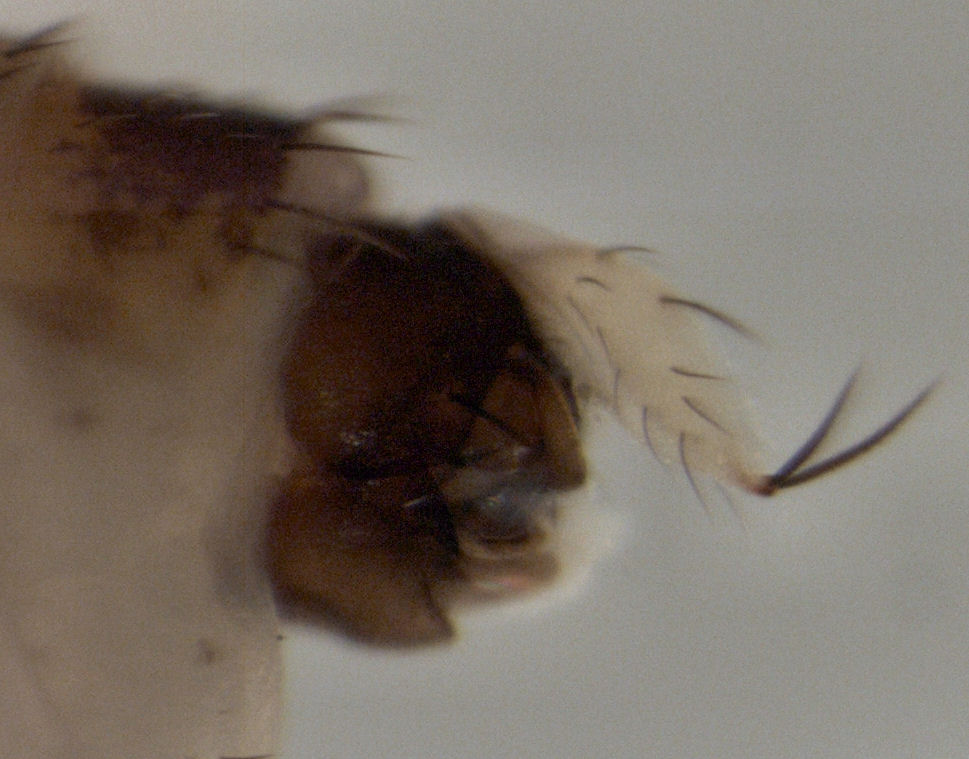
The structures at the end of a male Megaselia scalaris' abdomen

The fly Megaselia scalaris is a member of the order Diptera and the family Phoridae, and it is widely distributed in warm regions of the world. Members of this family are commonly known as "humpbacked flies", "coffin flies", and "scuttle flies". The name "scuttle fly" derives from the jerky, short bursts of running, characteristic to the adult fly. The name "coffin fly" is due to their being found in coffins, digging six feet deep in order to reach buried corpses. It is one of the more common species found within the family Phoridae; more than 370 species have been identified within North America.

== Taxonomy ==
Megaselia scalaris was described by the German entomologist Hermann Loew in 1866.

== Description ==
Adults of this species are about 2 mm long and yellowish with dark markings. The labellum and labrum have trichoid and conical sensilla, and the labellum's ventral surface has five pairs of sharp teeth. The hind femur has hairs below its basal half and these are shorter than hairs in an anteroventral row on the distal half. The hind tibia lacks a clearly differentiated row of spine-like antero-dorsal hairs. There is a pair of translucent wings, in which vein 3 is not or barely broader than the costa.

In males, the labellum has a dense covering of microtrichia, the bristles at the tip of the anal tube are longer than the longest hairs of the cerci, and the longest hair of the left side of the epandrium is almost bristle-like. In females, the tergite of the sixth abdominal segment is short, narrow, shiny, and extends laterally on the segment, unlike tergites of preceding segments.

Larvae of this species are pale, legless and covered in rows of short spines. The anterior end has the mouthparts, which look like a pair of sharp spines and are darker than the surrounding tissue. The posterior end has a pair of spiracles.

== Life cycle ==
=== Egg and larva ===
The development of M. scalaris is holometabolous, consisting of four distinct stages. These stages include: egg, larva, pupa, and adult. There are three distinct larval instars of M. scalaris. The third instar of development usually lasts longer than the first two because there are dramatic changes from a larva into a fly. The development of each life cycle depends on the environmental conditions in which the larvae are feeding or being reared. It generally occurs "at 22-24°C, the first instar lasts 1-2 days, the second 1-2 days, and the third 3-4 days before pupariation and a further 1-2 days before pupation." The larvae are usually very small, roughly between 1 and 8 mm in length. Megaselia scalaris larvae display a unique behavior of swallowing air when they are exposed to small pools of liquid. This intake of air gives them the ability to float, which may prevent drowning in flood conditions in the natural environment.

=== Pupa and adult ===
Males of M. scalaris mature more quickly than females, with males emerging from pupae two days prior to the females. Emerging before the females gives the males the advantage to feed, allowing their sperm to mature by the time the females emerge. Adult M. scalaris reproduce by means of oviposition. The females lay relatively large eggs for their size due to the extended incubation period of the eggs.

== Feeding habits ==
Many of the flies within the family Phoridae prefer nectar as an energy source; however, M. scalaris is an omnivorous species. It has been recorded feeding on plants, wounds, and corpses. Protein food sources are preferred by the females preceding maturation of their eggs. All meals must be a fluid in order for the flies to access the meal because M. scalaris has sponging mouthparts. This is a characteristic common to phorids.

The sharp teeth possessed by adults are not used in retrieval of a food source, like a piercing mouthpart, but are instead used to aid digestion and breakdown of nutrients. Human cases involving skin inflammation are likely due to these teeth. While M. scalaris can feed on blood meals, the teeth are not used to puncture the host. The blood must be found on the body as an exudate. One theory to the evolution of these teeth is that M. scalaris uses them in order to exit their pupal casings.

== Habitat ==
Megaselia scalaris' optimal culture temperature is 28 °C. They are common in many areas but thrive predominately in moist unsanitary vicinities such as dumpsters, trash containers, rotting meat, vegetable remains, public washrooms, homes, and sewer pipes. Although referred to as scavengers, adults are known to feed primarily on sugars. The larvae, however, depend on moist decaying plant or animal material and feed on a wide range of additional decaying material.

== Importance to forensic entomology ==
Megaselia scalaris are important in the study of forensic entomology because evidence derived from the lifecycle and behavior of these flies is useful in both medicocriminal and abuse/neglect cases and is admissible in court.

These flies are small in size; this allows them to locate carrion buried within the ground and to locate bodies concealed in coffins. They can travel 0.5 m in a four-day period. They lay their eggs on carrion to provide food for the hatched larvae.

Often, M. scalaris may be the only forensic entomological evidence available if the carrion is obstructed or concealed in a place that is hard for other insects to reach. Larger flies are not always able to reach the carrion. Calculations involving M. scalaris can result in an insect colonization time that can be used for a postmortem interval, which may help establish an estimated time of death. Megaselia scalaris are classified in a secondary forensic role because they prefer older decaying carrion.

Evidence collected by forensic entomologists involving M. scalaris has been used to demonstrate in court that caretakers have neglected the care of their elderly patients. This species can also cause myiasis in humans. Megaselia scalaris larvae found on a body can be used in court as a tool to show "time of death" or "time of neglect".

== Current and future research ==
Megaselia scalaris is commonly used in research and within the lab because it is easily cultured; this species is used in experiments involving genetic, developmental, and bioassay studies. Research has also been done on the unique neurophysiology and neuromuscular junction within this fly, giving it its characteristic "scuttle" movement. In comparison to Drosophila melanogaster, M. scalaris has decreased excitatory postsynaptic potentials (EPSPs) and facilitation of EPSPs in response to repetitive stimulation. With such a wide range of food sources, the larvae can be considered facultative predators, parasitoids, or parasites.

== Bibliography ==
- Disney, R. H. L (1994). Scuttle Flies: The Phoridae. Chapman & Hall. ISBN 9780412565205.
- Peterson B. V. (1987). Phoridae. In: Manual of Nearctic Diptera. Vol. 2. Canada Department of Agriculture Research Branch, Monograph no. 27, p. 689-712. The full text (53 MB) ISBN 0-660-12125-5
