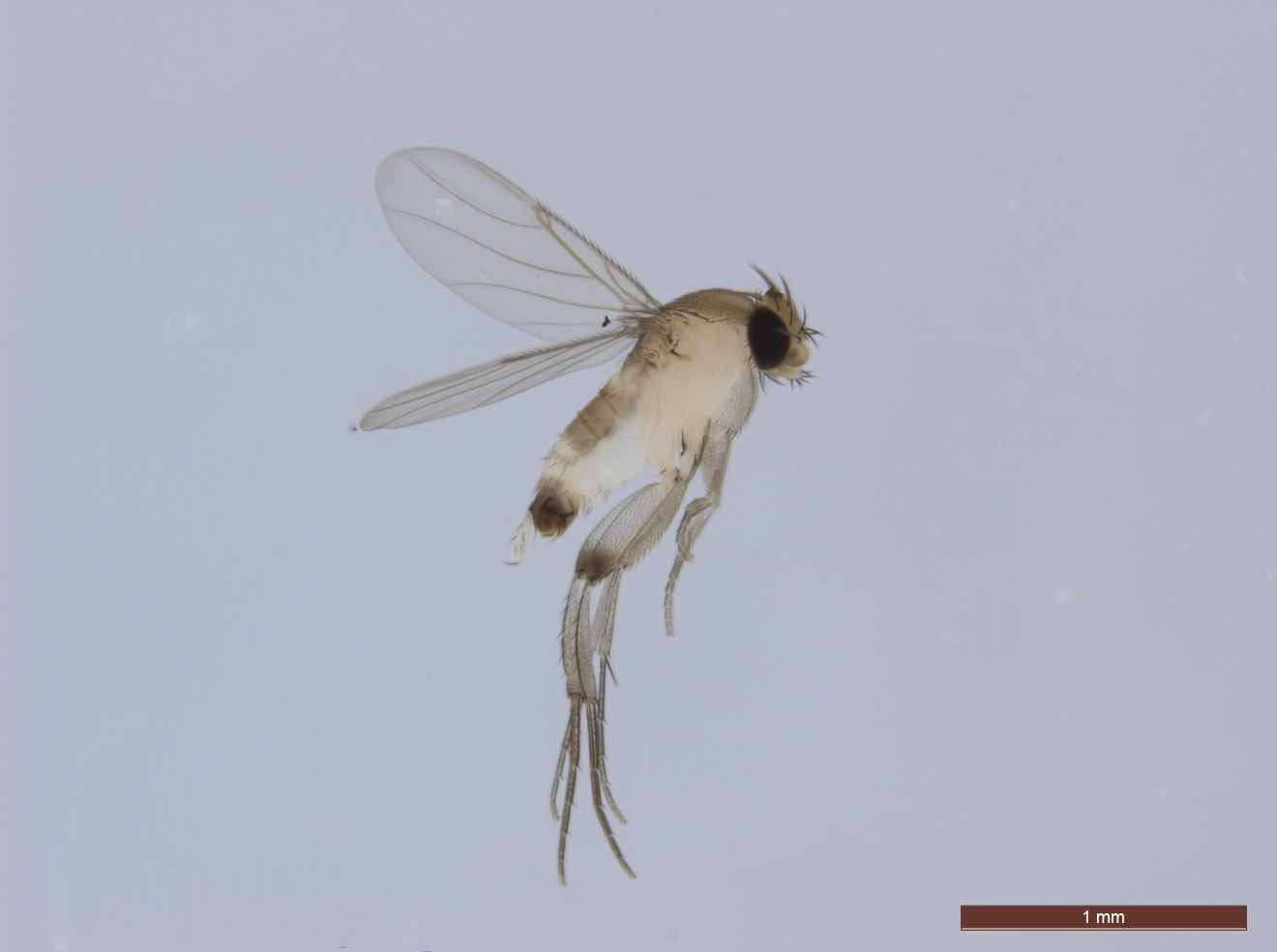
- Megaselia sp.

Scientific classification
- Kingdom: Animalia
- Phylum: Arthropoda
- Clade: Pancrustacea
- Class: Insecta
- Order: Diptera
- Family: Phoridae
- Subfamily: Metopininae
- Genus: Megaselia; Rondani, 1856

Type species
- Megaselia crassineura Rondani, 1856

Synonyms
- Obelosia Lioy, 1864; Trisometopia Lioy, 1864; Aphiochaeta Brues, 1904; Trichometopia Bezzi & Stein, 1907; Byrsophrys Enderlein, 1912; Mallochina Schmitz, 1918; Heterophora Borgmeier, 1923; Lioyella Enderlein, 1924; Parametopina Borgmeier, 1924; Pogonopleura Enderlein, 1924; Stirocnemia Enderlein, 1927; Epimegaselia Beyer, 1959; Quasipseudacteon Beyer, 1959; Hemiplastophora Beyer, 1965; Metaplastophora Beyer, 1965; Tarsophoromyia Beyer, 1965

= Megaselia =

Genus of flies

Megaselia is a genus of flies in the family Phoridae.

== See also ==
- List of Megaselia species
