= List of Hypothenemus species =

These species belong to the genus Hypothenemus, oriental bark beetles.

== Hypothenemus species ==
- Hypothenemus aberrans Browne, 1973
- Hypothenemus abhorrens Wood, 2007
- Hypothenemus abruptus (Schedl, 1961)
- Hypothenemus acaciae (Eggers, 1920)
- Hypothenemus adscitus (Schedl, 1950)
- Hypothenemus adustus Bright, 2019
- Hypothenemus aethiops (Schedl, 1965)
- Hypothenemus africanus (Hopkins, 1915)
- Hypothenemus agnatus (Eggers, 1924)
- Hypothenemus alternatus (Eggers, 1943)
- Hypothenemus amakusanus (Murayama, 1934)
- Hypothenemus amplissimus Bright & Torres, 2006
- Hypothenemus apicalis Wood, 1974
- Hypothenemus areccae (Hornung, 1842)
- Hypothenemus artocarpi Browne, 1978
- Hypothenemus arundinis (Eichhoff, 1878)
- Hypothenemus ascitus Wood, 1971
- Hypothenemus ater Eggers, 1932
- Hypothenemus aterrimulus Wood, 1989
- Hypothenemus aterrimus (Schedl, 1951)
- Hypothenemus atomus Hopkins, 1915
- Hypothenemus atratus (Schedl, 1964)
- Hypothenemus attenuatus (Eggers, 1935)
- Hypothenemus aulmanni Hagedorn, 1912
- Hypothenemus avitus Bright & Poinar, 1994
- Hypothenemus balachowskyi Menier, 1971
- Hypothenemus baloghi (Schedl, 1967)
- Hypothenemus bambusae Browne, 1980
- Hypothenemus barinensis Wood, 2007
- Hypothenemus bauhaniae (Schedl, 1950)
- Hypothenemus bezaziani Peyerimhoff, 1935
- Hypothenemus bicinctus Schedl, 1959
- Hypothenemus bidens Browne, 1973
- Hypothenemus bifurcatus Bright, 2019
- Hypothenemus birmanus (Eichhoff, 1878)
- Hypothenemus biseriatus (Eggers, 1919)
- Hypothenemus bolivianus (Eggers, 1931)
- Hypothenemus brevicollis (Eggers, 1927)
- Hypothenemus brevis Eggers, 1932
- Hypothenemus californicus Hopkins, 1915
- Hypothenemus camerunus (Eggers, 1922)
- Hypothenemus carbonarius Eggers, 1943
- Hypothenemus carinafrons Bright, 2019
- Hypothenemus colae (Schedl, 1957)
- Hypothenemus collinus Bright, 2019
- Hypothenemus columbi Hopkins, 1915
- Hypothenemus concolor Hagedorn, 1909
- Hypothenemus costatus (Eichhoff, 1878)
- Hypothenemus crinatus Bright, 2019
- Hypothenemus criticus (Schedl, 1937)
- Hypothenemus crudiae (Panzer, 1791)
- Hypothenemus cryphaloides (Eichhoff, 1878)
- Hypothenemus cuneolus (Schedl, 1936)
- Hypothenemus curtipennis (Schedl, 1950)
- Hypothenemus cylindraceus Schedl, 1972
- Hypothenemus cynometrae Schedl, 1957
- Hypothenemus delicatus Schedl, 1964
- Hypothenemus deprecator (Schedl, 1941)
- Hypothenemus dexter (Sampson, 1922)
- Hypothenemus dimorphus (Schedl, 1959)
- Hypothenemus dipterocarpi Hopkins, 1915
- Hypothenemus discordis Bright, 2019
- Hypothenemus dissimilis (Zimmermann, 1868)
- Hypothenemus distinctus Wood, 1954
- Hypothenemus dolichocola Hopkins, 1915
- Hypothenemus donisi (Schedl, 1957)
- Hypothenemus dorsosignatus (Schedl, 1950)
- Hypothenemus dubitalis Bright, 2019
- Hypothenemus ebenus Wood, 2007
- Hypothenemus elephas (Eichhoff, 1872)
- Hypothenemus emmi (Hagedorn, 1913)
- Hypothenemus erectus LeConte, 1876
- Hypothenemus eruditus (Westwood, 1834)
- Hypothenemus euphorbiae (Schedl, 1961)
- Hypothenemus exceptus Bright, 2019
- Hypothenemus exiguus (Wood, 1986)
- Hypothenemus eximius Schedl, 1951
- Hypothenemus externedentatus Schedl, 1959
- Hypothenemus flavus Hopkins, 1915
- Hypothenemus fuscicollis (Eichhoff, 1878)
- Hypothenemus georgiae (Hopkins, 1915)
- Hypothenemus glabratulus (Schedl, 1957)
- Hypothenemus glabripennis (Hopkins, 1915)
- Hypothenemus gossypii (Hopkins, 1915)
- Hypothenemus grandis Schedl, 1939
- Hypothenemus granulatus Bright, 2019
- Hypothenemus hampei (Ferrari, 1867)
- Hypothenemus hirsutus (Wood, 1954)
- Hypothenemus hystrix (Eggers, 1919)
- Hypothenemus ignotus Bright, 2019
- Hypothenemus improvidus Bright, 2019
- Hypothenemus incognitus (Schedl, 1967)
- Hypothenemus indigens Wood, 1974
- Hypothenemus indigenus Bright & Peck, 1998
- Hypothenemus indistinctus Bright, 2019
- Hypothenemus ingens Schedl, 1942
- Hypothenemus inordinatus Bright, 2019
- Hypothenemus insulanus Bright, 2002
- Hypothenemus interstitialis (Hopkins, 1915)
- Hypothenemus intricatus (Schedl, 1950)
- Hypothenemus japonicus (Niisima, 1910)
- Hypothenemus javanus (Eggers, 1908)
- Hypothenemus kamathi Beaver, 1995
- Hypothenemus kraunhiae Murayama, 1950
- Hypothenemus lefevrei (Schedl, 1952)
- Hypothenemus leprieuri (Perris, 1866)
- Hypothenemus leptosquamus Bright, 2019
- Hypothenemus liberiensis (Hopkins, 1915)
- Hypothenemus liliputianus Bright, 2019
- Hypothenemus lineatus (Eggers, 1927)
- Hypothenemus longipennis (Eggers, 1935)
- Hypothenemus longipilis Schedl, 1952
- Hypothenemus loranthus (Schedl, 1942)
- Hypothenemus macrolobii (Eggers, 1940)
- Hypothenemus madagascariensis Schedl, 1953
- Hypothenemus magnus (Eggers, 1924)
- Hypothenemus major Browne, 1970
- Hypothenemus malayensis (Schedl, 1977)
- Hypothenemus mallyi (Hopkins, 1915)
- Hypothenemus malus (Schedl, 1957)
- Hypothenemus mangovorus Schedl, 1961
- Hypothenemus marginatus Johnson, 2020
- Hypothenemus marshalli (Eggers, 1936)
- Hypothenemus mateui (Schedl, 1965)
- Hypothenemus melanarius (Schedl, 1953)
- Hypothenemus melasomus (Lea, 1910)
- Hypothenemus meridensis Wood, 2007
- Hypothenemus miles (LeConte, 1878)
- Hypothenemus minor (Eggers, 1927)
- Hypothenemus modestus (Murayama, 1940)
- Hypothenemus morigerus (Schedl, 1957)
- Hypothenemus morio (Eggers, 1940)
- Hypothenemus morosus Schedl, 1965
- Hypothenemus mozambiquensis Eggers, 1943
- Hypothenemus mulongensis (Eggers, 1940)
- Hypothenemus multidentatulus (Schedl, 1962)
- Hypothenemus multidentatus (Hopkins, 1915)
- Hypothenemus multipunctatus (Schedl, 1939)
- Hypothenemus muticus (Schedl, 1961)
- Hypothenemus namosianus Browne, 1983
- Hypothenemus nanellus Wood, 1971
- Hypothenemus nanoparvus Bright, 2019
- Hypothenemus natalensis (Schedl, 1941)
- Hypothenemus nesiotus Bright, 2019
- Hypothenemus nigropiceus (Schedl, 1951)
- Hypothenemus novateutonicus (Schedl, 1951)
- Hypothenemus obscurifrons Bright, 2019
- Hypothenemus obscurus (Fabricius, 1801)
- Hypothenemus opacus (Eichhoff, 1872)
- Hypothenemus paradoxus Schedl, 1964
- Hypothenemus parallelus (Hopkins, 1915)
- Hypothenemus parasquamosus Bright, 2019
- Hypothenemus parvulosus Bright, 2019
- Hypothenemus parvulus Browne, 1984
- Hypothenemus paulus Bright, 2019
- Hypothenemus perappositus (Schedl, 1934)
- Hypothenemus perexiguus Bright, 2019
- Hypothenemus perhispidus (Eggers, 1927)
- Hypothenemus perpunctatus (Eggers, 1940)
- Hypothenemus piaparolinae Johnson, Atkinson & Hulcr, 2016
- Hypothenemus pilosus Hopkins, 1915
- Hypothenemus ponticus Bright, 2019
- Hypothenemus praecellens (Schedl, 1972)
- Hypothenemus pubescens Hopkins, 1915
- Hypothenemus pubipennis (Eggers, 1935)
- Hypothenemus puertoricensis (Bright & Torres, 2006)
- Hypothenemus pullus (Wood, 1971)
- Hypothenemus pygmaeomorphus Bright, 2019
- Hypothenemus rotundicollis (Eichhoff, 1878)
- Hypothenemus rubrithorax Bright, 2019
- Hypothenemus ruficeps Perkins, 1900
- Hypothenemus rugifer (Schedl, 1965)
- Hypothenemus ruginosus Wood, 1989
- Hypothenemus rugosipes Wood, 2007
- Hypothenemus sambesianus Eggers, 1943
- Hypothenemus sapporoensis (Niisima, 1910)
- Hypothenemus sassaensis (Eggers, 1924)
- Hypothenemus schedli Browne, 1963
- Hypothenemus scutiae (Schedl, 1959)
- Hypothenemus seoulensis Choo & Woo, 1989
- Hypothenemus seriatus (Eichhoff, 1872)
- Hypothenemus setiferous Bright, 2019
- Hypothenemus setosus (Eichhoff, 1868)
- Hypothenemus simoni (Reitter, 1887)
- Hypothenemus sobrinus (Schedl, 1965)
- Hypothenemus socialis (Schedl, 1957)
- Hypothenemus solitarius (Schedl, 1950)
- Hypothenemus solivagus Bright, 2019
- Hypothenemus solocis Wood, 1974
- Hypothenemus sparsedentatus (Schedl, 1942)
- Hypothenemus sparsus Hopkins, 1915
- Hypothenemus spinatus (Schedl, 1977)
- Hypothenemus spinicollis (Schedl, 1965)
- Hypothenemus spinosus (Schedl, 1979)
- Hypothenemus squamosulus Johnson, 2020
- Hypothenemus squamosus (Hopkins, 1915)
- Hypothenemus stigmosus (Schedl, 1951)
- Hypothenemus striatus (Atkinson, 1993)
- Hypothenemus styrax (Schedl, 1942)
- Hypothenemus subacuminatus (Schedl, 1942)
- Hypothenemus subterrestris Johnson, Atkinson & Hulcr, 2016
- Hypothenemus suspectus Wood, 1974
- Hypothenemus tectus Bright, 2019
- Hypothenemus teretis Wood, 1971
- Hypothenemus teteforti (Menier, 1971)
- Hypothenemus tredli (Reitter, 1908)
- Hypothenemus tristis (Eichhoff, 1876)
- Hypothenemus trivialis Wood, 1974
- Hypothenemus tuberosus (Schedl, 1942)
- Hypothenemus turnbowi Bright, 2019
- Hypothenemus ustulatus Bright, 2019
- Hypothenemus vernaculus Bright, 2019
- Hypothenemus versicolor Bright, 2019
- Hypothenemus vesculus Wood, 1974
- Hypothenemus villosus Bright, 2019
- Hypothenemus virolae Wood, 2007
- Hypothenemus vitis Browne, 1970
- Hypothenemus winkleri (Reitter, 1907)
- Hypothenemus woodi Bright, 2019
- Hypothenemus xanthophloeae (Schedl, 1957)
