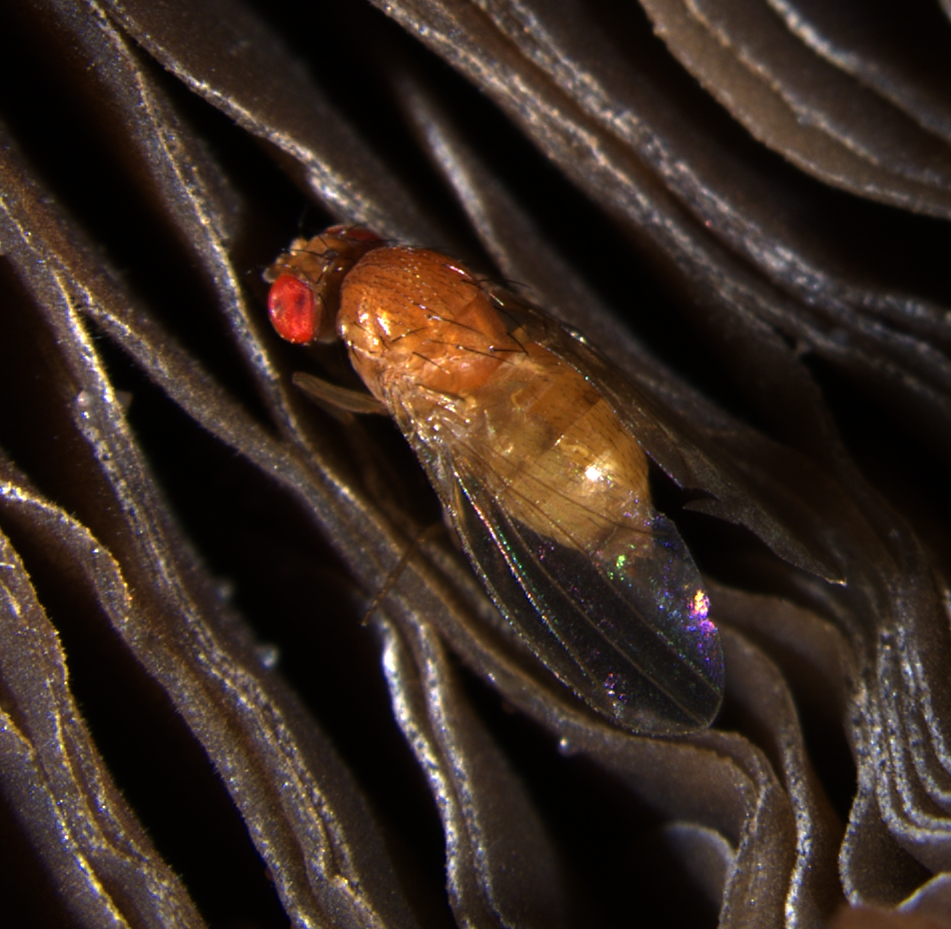
- A Drosophila neotestacea female on the gills of an Agaricus mushroom

Scientific classification
- Kingdom: Animalia
- Phylum: Arthropoda
- Class: Insecta
- Order: Diptera
- Family: Drosophilidae
- Subfamily: Drosophilinae
- Genus: Drosophila
- Subgenus: Drosophila
- Species group: testacea
- Species: D. neotestacea

Binomial name
- Drosophila neotestacea Grimaldi, James, and Jaenike, 1992

= Drosophila neotestacea =

Species of fly

Drosophila neotestacea is a member of the testacea species group of Drosophila. Testacea species are specialist fruit flies that breed on the fruiting bodies of mushrooms. These flies will choose to breed on psychoactive mushrooms such as the Fly Agaric Amanita muscaria. Drosophila neotestacea can be found in temperate regions of North America, ranging from the north eastern United States to western Canada.

== Immunity ==
A dissected Drosophila infected with Howardula aoronymphium nematodes

Drosophila neotestacea and other mushroom-breeding Drosophila have been studied extensively for their interactions with Howardula nematode parasites, particularly Howardula aoronymphium. Unlike related species, D. neotestacea is sterilized by H. aoronymphium infection. The genetic basis of this susceptibility is unknown, and is nematode-dependent. For instance, a related Howardula species from Japan does not sterilize D. neotestacea, even though the European and North American Howardula species do. Moreover, the related Drosophila orientacea is resistant to infection by the European Howardula nematodes, but susceptible to the Japanese Howardula nematodes. Accordingly, nematode infection strongly suppresses genes involved in egg development. Comparisons between D. neotestacea and nematode-resistant members of the Testacea species group can help tease apart interactions of fly immunity genetics and nematode parasitism genetics.

Initially discovered in D. neotestacea, mushroom-feeding flies are commonly infected with the trypanosomatid parasite Jaenimonas drosophilae.

The major innate immunity pathways of Drosophila are found in D. neotestacea, however the antimicrobial peptide Diptericin B has been lost. This loss of Diptericin B is also common to the related Drosophila testacea and Drosophila guttifera, but not the also-related Drosophila innubila. As such, these loss events appear to have been independent, suggesting that Diptericin B is actively selected against in these species; indeed, Diptericin B is conserved in all other Drosophila species. It also seems that unrelated Tephritid fruit flies have independently derived a Diptericin gene strikingly similar to the Drosophila Diptericin B gene. Like mushroom-feeding flies, these Tephritids also have a non-frugivorous sub-lineage that has similarly lost the Tephritid Diptericin B gene. These evolutionary patterns in mushroom-breeding Drosophila and other fruit flies suggests that the immune system's effectors (like antimicrobial peptides) are directly shaped by host ecology.

== Symbiosis ==
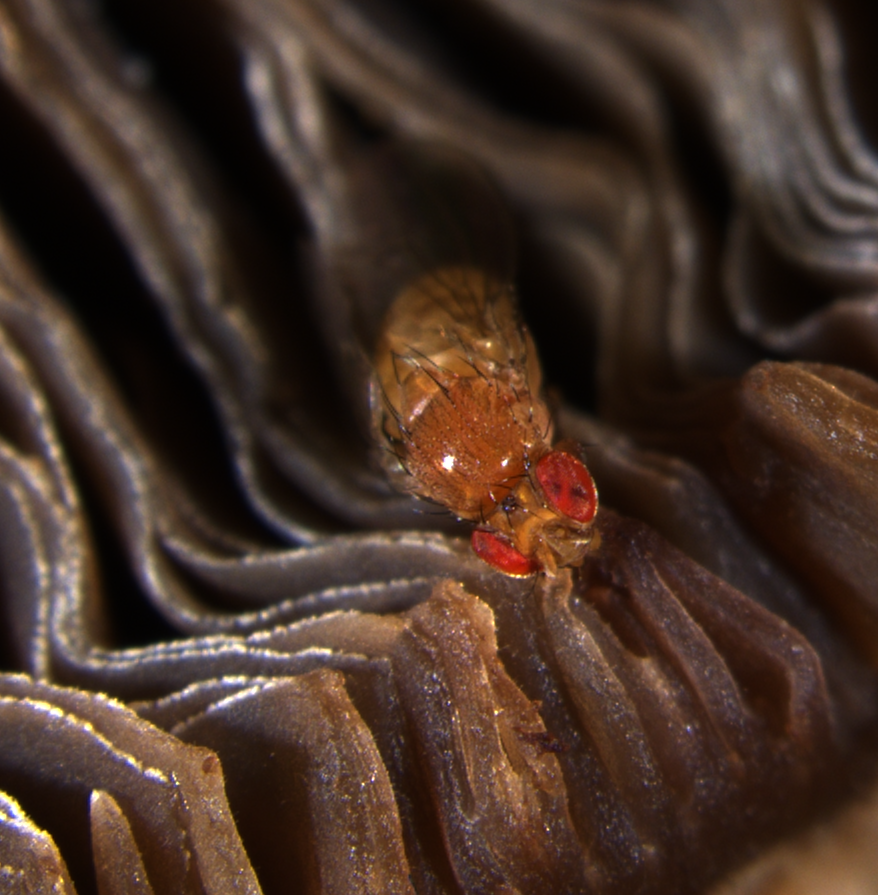
Mushroom sites are infested with nematodes and other natural enemies

Drosophila neotestacea can harbour bacterial symbionts including Wolbachia and notably Spiroplasma poulsonii. The S. poulsonii strain of D. neotestacea has spread westward across North America due to the selective pressure imposed by the sterilizing nematode parasite Howardula aoronymphium. While S. poulsonii can be found in other Drosophila species, the D. neotestacea strain is unique in defending its host against nematode infestation. Like other S. poulsonii strains, the D. neotestacea strain also protects its host from parasitic wasp infestation.

The mechanism through which S. poulsonii protects flies from nematodes and parasitic wasps relies on the presence of toxins called ribosome-inactivating proteins (RIPs), similar to Sarcin or Ricin. These toxins cut a conserved structure in ribosomal RNA, ultimately changing the nucleotide sequence at a specific site. This leaves a signature of RIP attack in nematode and wasp RNA. Spiroplasma poulsonii likely avoids damaging its host fly by carrying parasite-specific complements of RIP toxins encoded on bacterial plasmids. This allows genes for RIP toxins to readily move between species by horizontal gene transfer, as D. neotestacea Spiroplasma RIPs are shared by Spiroplasma of other mushroom-feeding flies, such as Megaselia nigra.

== Selfish genetic elements ==
The Testacea species group is used in population genetics to study sex-ratio distorting 'selfish' or 'driving' X chromosomes. Selfish X chromosomes bias the offspring of males such that fathers only produce daughters. This increases the spread of the selfish X chromosome, as Y chromosome-bearing sperm are never transmitted. In wild populations, up to 30% of D. neotestacea individuals can harbour a selfish X chromosome. The spread of the D. neotestacea selfish X is limited by climatic factors, predicted by the harshness of winter. Thus, its frequency in the wild may be affected by ongoing climate change. The mechanism of X chromosome drive may be related to a duplication of an importin gene, a type of nuclear transport protein.

Often, selfish X chromosomes suppress genetic recombination during meiosis. This process maintains the gene clusters that promote X chromosome drive, but also can lead to an accumulation of deleterious mutations via a process known as Muller's ratchet. The D. neotestacea selfish X suppresses recombination in lab settings, but occasional recombination occurs in the wild evidenced by recombinant genetic regions in wild-caught flies. Other Testacea species harbour selfish X chromosomes, raising the question of whether X chromosome drive played a role in speciation of the Testacea group. At least one selfish X in Testacea group flies is old enough to have been present in the last-common ancestor of Drosophila testacea and Drosophila orientacea.

== See also ==
- Drosophila testacea species group
- Spiroplasma
- Meiotic drive
