= Drosophila orientacea =

Scientific classification
- Domain: Eukaryota
- Kingdom: Animalia
- Phylum: Arthropoda
- Class: Insecta
- Order: Diptera
- Family: Drosophilidae
- Subfamily: Drosophilinae
- Genus: Drosophila
- Subgenus: Drosophila
- Species group: testacea
- Species: D. orientacea

Binomial name
- Drosophila orientacea Grimaldi, James, and Jaenike, 1992

Species of fly

Drosophila orientacea is a member of the testacea species group of Drosophila. Testacea species are specialist fruit flies that breed on the fruiting bodies of mushrooms. Drosophila orientacea is found in northern Japan on the island of Hokkaido. However, the European species Drosophila testacea and D. orientacea can produce viable hybrids, blurring the level of speciation between the two species. While viable hybrids are produced, extreme behavioural barriers likely prevent mating in the wild. While D. orientacea readily mates with Drosophila neotestacea, viable hybrids are never produced. This hybrid inviability (see Haldane's rule) may be due either to issues during copulation, or selfish X chromosomes and co-evolved suppressors.

== See also ==
- Drosophila testacea species group
- Meiotic drive
- Haldane's rule
