= Kinesin ATP phosphohydrolase =

Kinesin ATP phosphohydrolase may refer to either:

- Plus-end-directed kinesin ATPase, an enzyme
- Minus-end-directed kinesin ATPase, an enzyme
