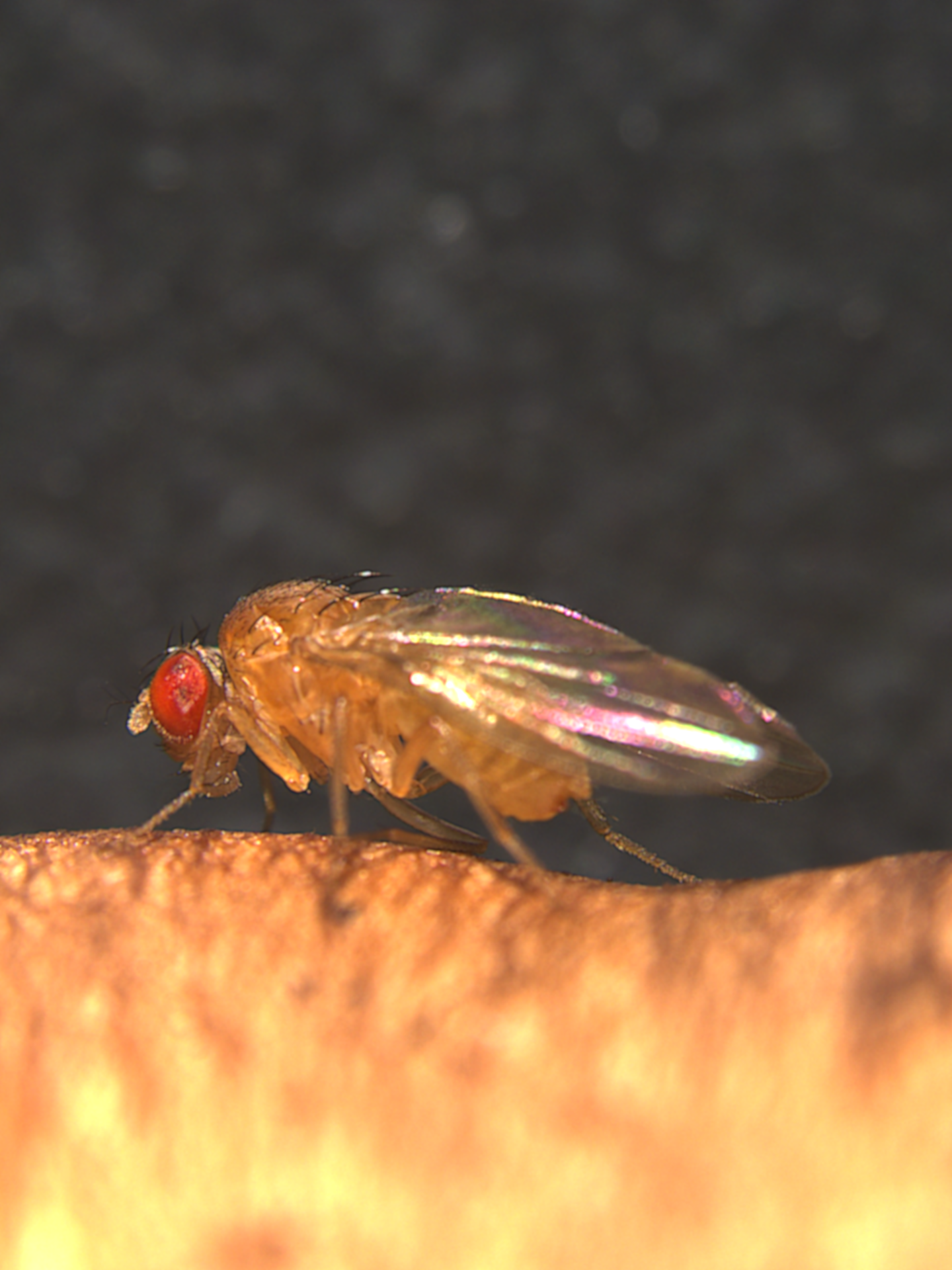
- Drosophila neotestacea

Scientific classification
- Kingdom: Animalia
- Phylum: Arthropoda
- Class: Insecta
- Order: Diptera
- Family: Drosophilidae
- Subfamily: Drosophilinae
- Genus: Drosophila
- Subgenus: Drosophila
- Species group: testacea

Species
- Drosophila neotestacea; Drosophila orientacea; Drosophila putrida; Drosophila testacea

= Drosophila testacea species group =

Species group of the subgenus Drosophila

The Drosophila testacea species group belongs to the Immigrans-tripunctata radiation of the subgenus Drosophila, and contains 4 species: Drosophila putrida, Drosophila neotestacea, Drosophila testacea, and Drosophila orientacea. Testacea species are specialist mushroom-feeding flies, and can metabolize toxic compounds in Amanita mushrooms. The Testacea species group is studied for its specialist ecology, population genetics, and bacterial endosymbionts. The North American species Drosophila neotestacea is perhaps the best-studied of the group for its interactions with parasitic wasps and nematodes, bacterial endosymbionts, and trypanosomatid parasites. Of note, selfish X chromosomes (a form of meiotic drive) have been discovered in three of the four Testacea group species.

Testacea species are commonly found in association with members of the Drosophila Quinaria species group due to their shared mushroom-feeding life history.

== Systematics ==
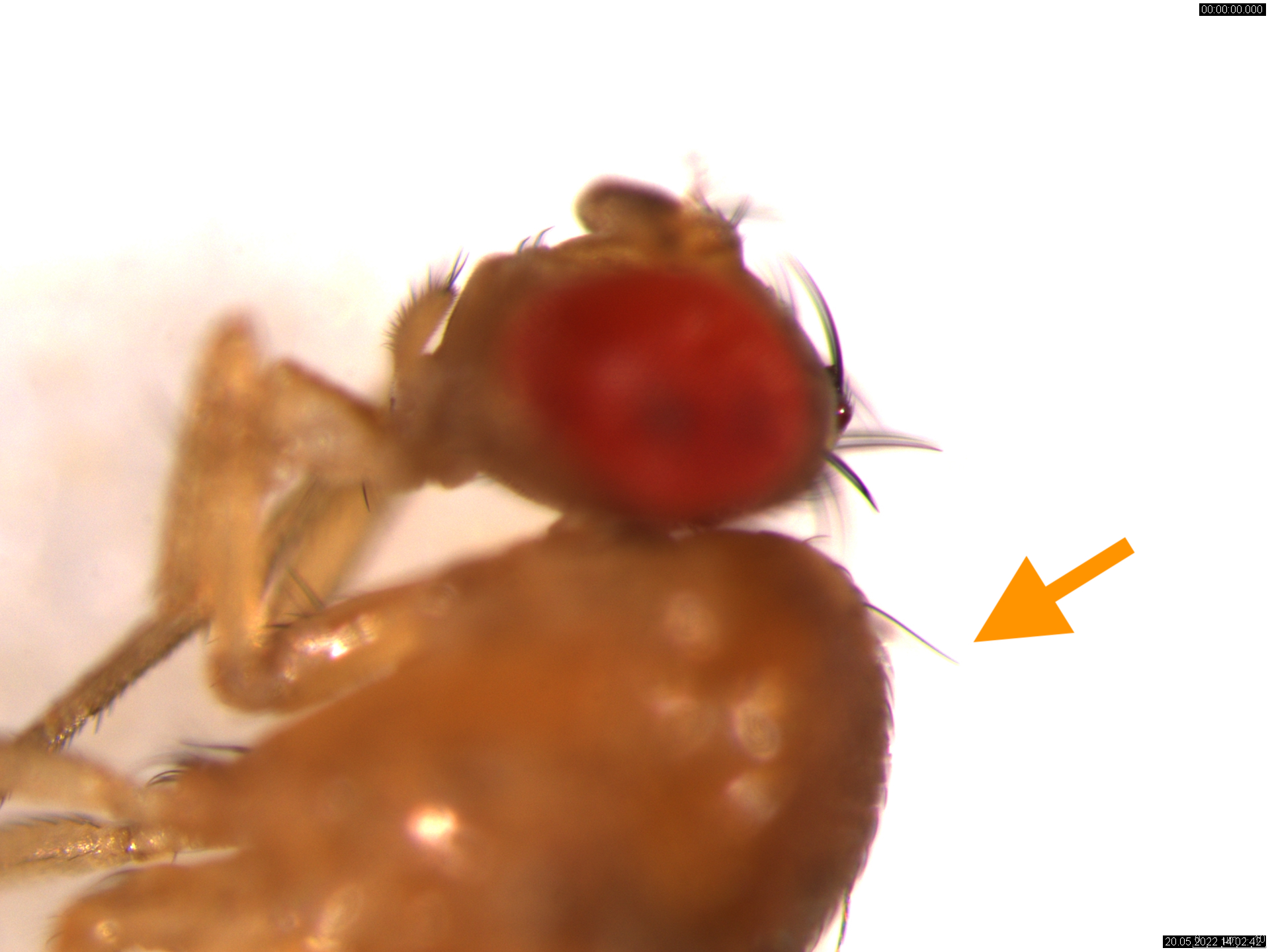
Drosophila testacea and Drosophila neotestacea can be readily identified compared to close relatives by the upward-turn of its presutural seta (orange arrow)

The species D. testacea and D. neotestacea of the Testacea species group can be identified based on the presence or absence of an upward turn on the presutural seta of the mesonotum (anterior dorsal thorax). The Testacea species group is a phylogenetically concise lineage consisting of 4 species. The closest outgroup of Testacea species is the Drosophila bizonata species group.

- - - Drosophila quinaria species group
- - - - Drosophila cardini species group
      - Drosophila tripunctata species group
  - - - Drosophila bizonata species group
    - - - Drosophila putrida
        - - - Drosophila neotestacea
          - - Drosophila orientacea
            - - Drosophila testacea

== Gallery ==
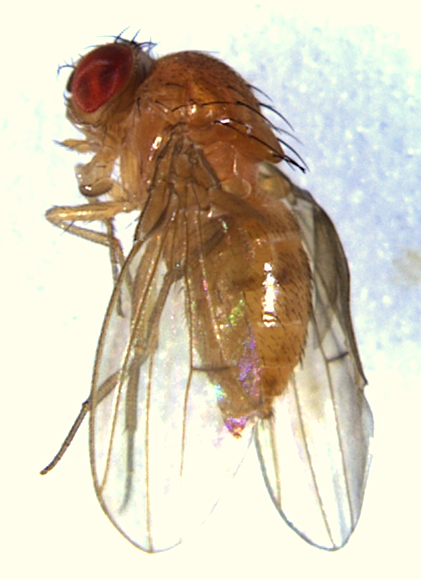
A D. neotestacea female

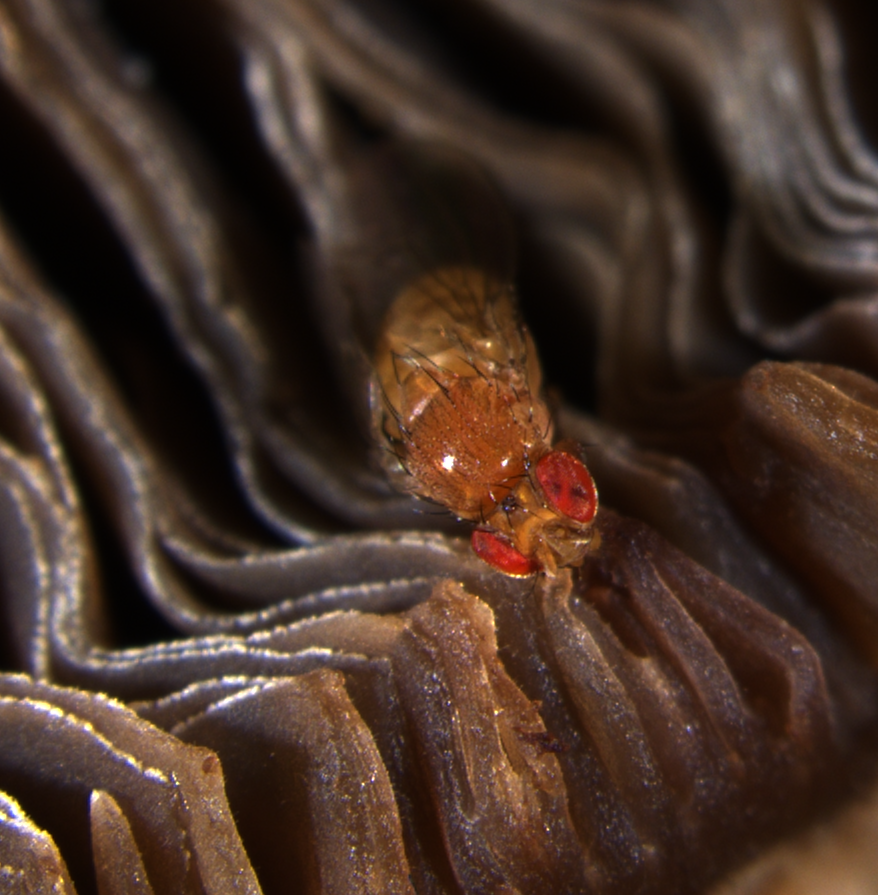
A D. neotestacea female on the gills of a mushroom

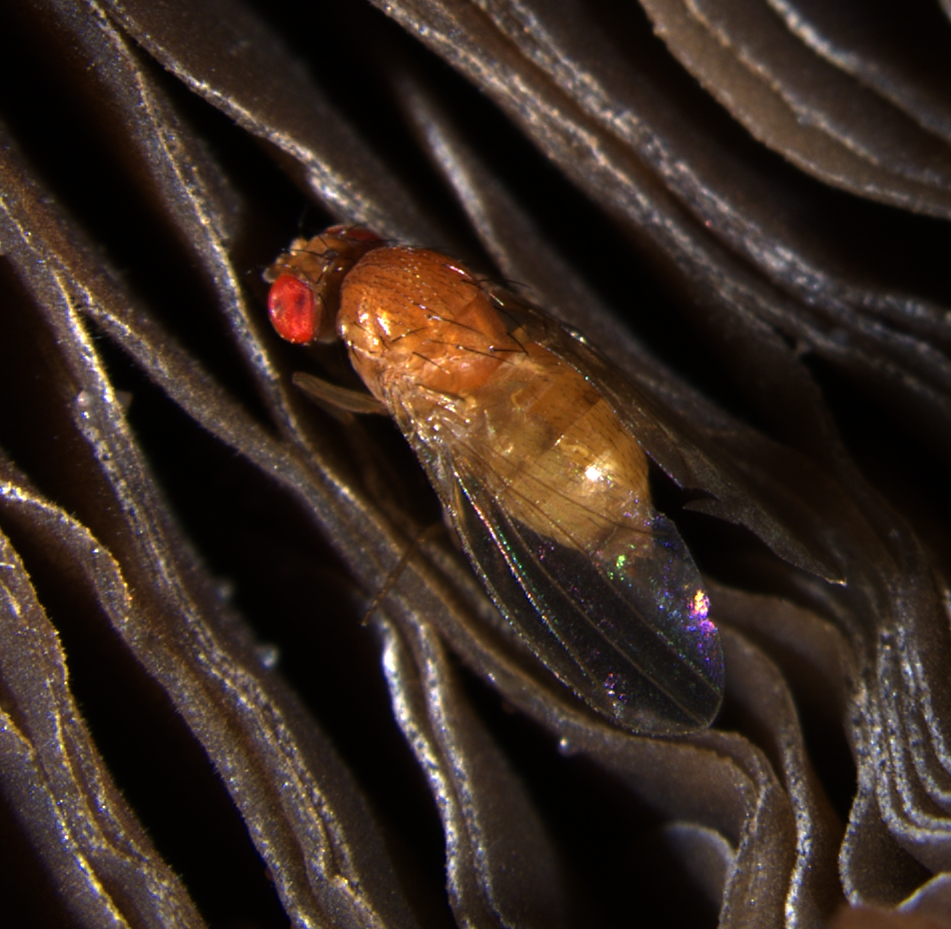
A D. neotestacea female on the gills of a mushroom

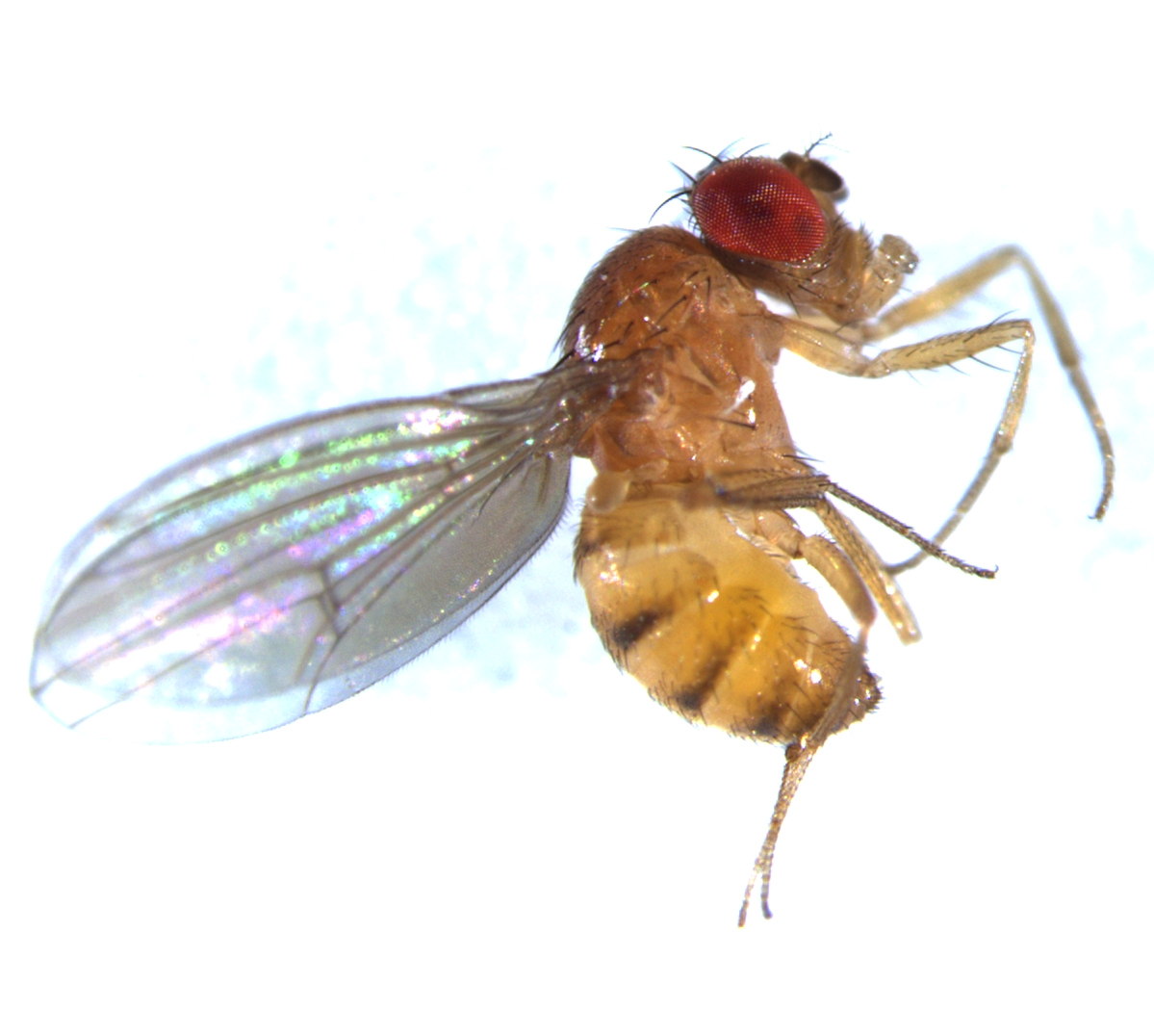
A D. testacea male

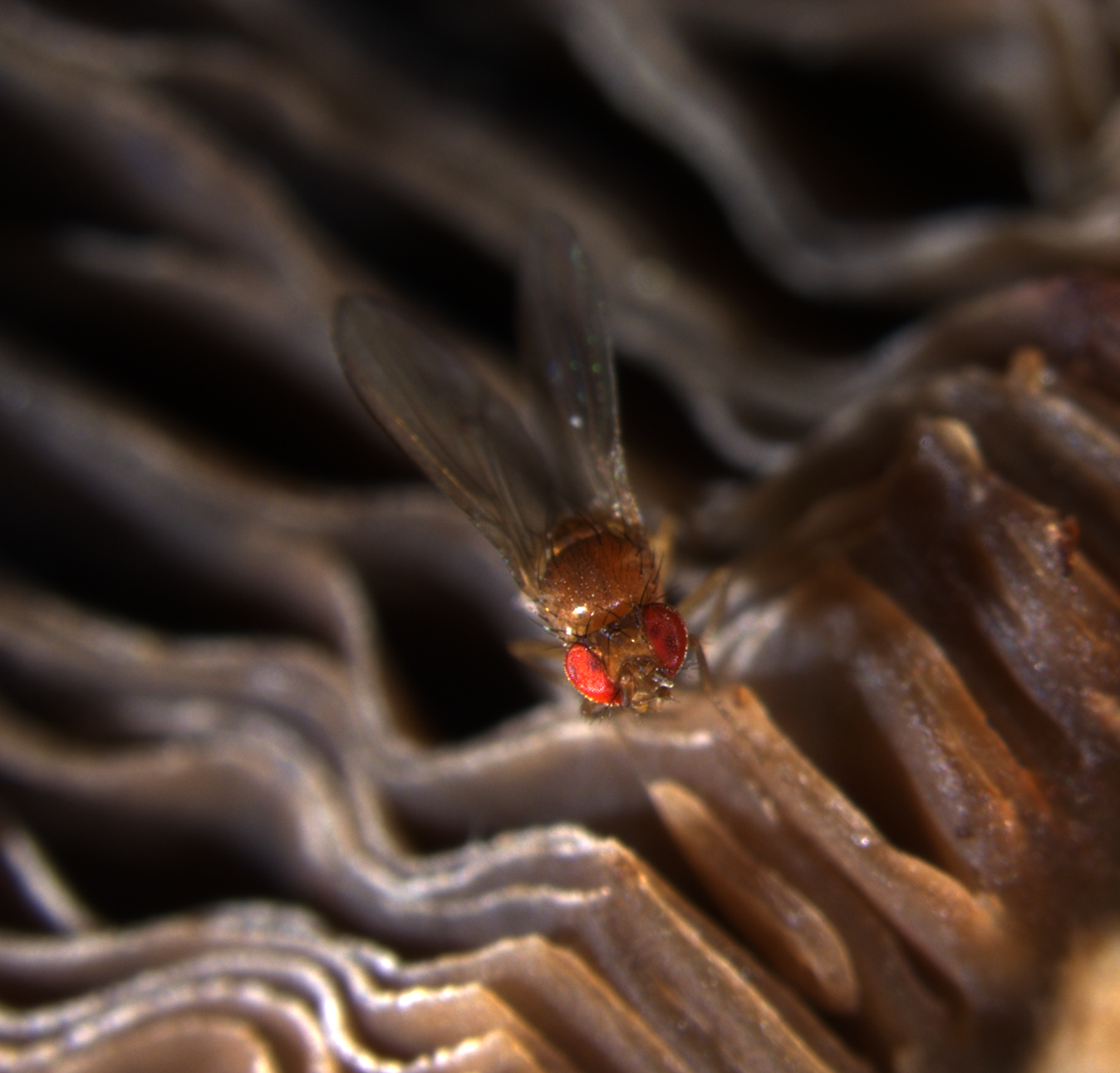
A D. testacea male on the gills of a mushroom

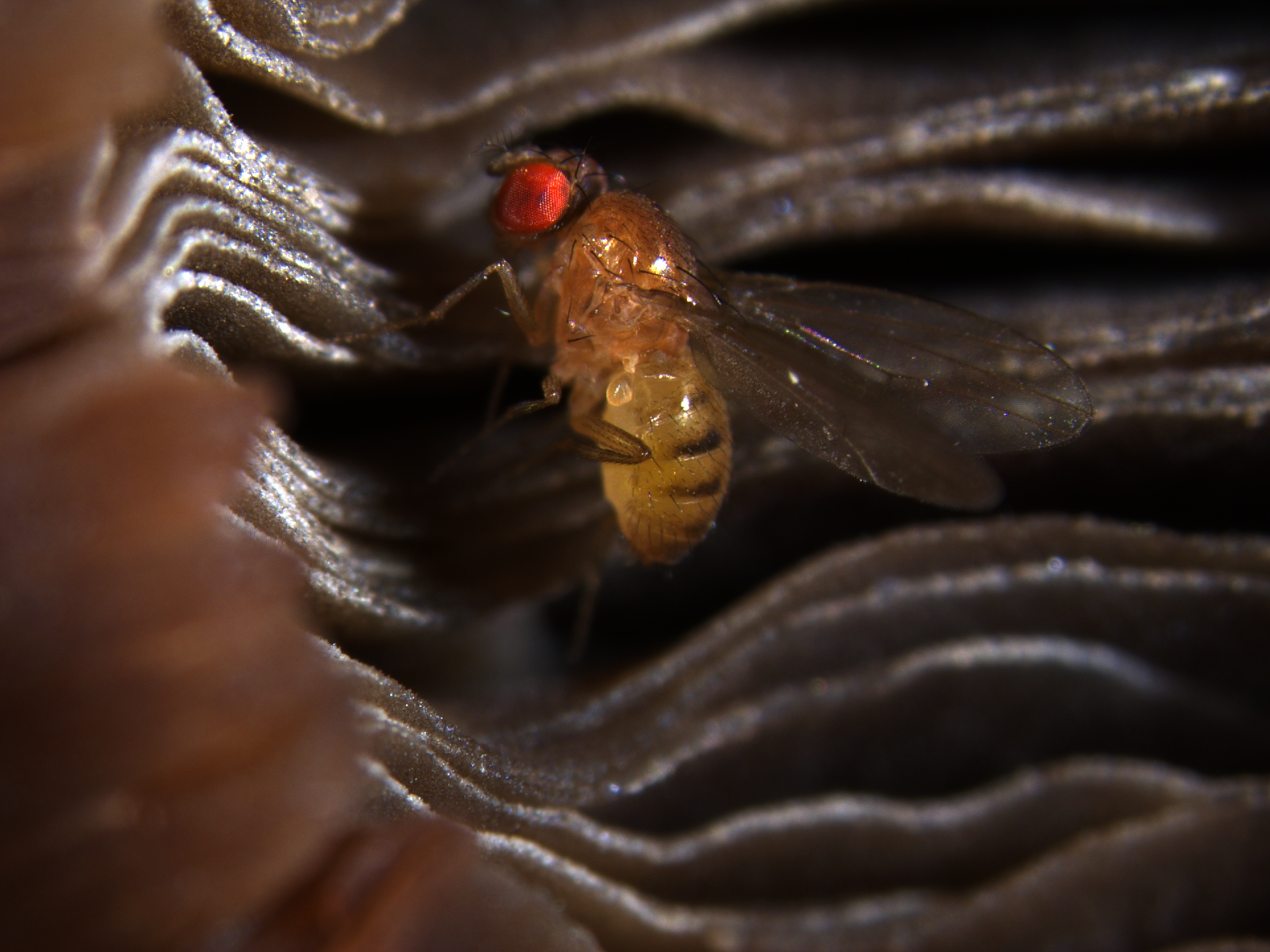
A D. testacea male on the gills of a mushroom
