= R2D2 (disambiguation) =

R2-D2 is a fictional robot in the Star Wars franchise.

R2-D2 or R2D2 may also refer to:

- R2d2 (mouse gene)
- Right 2 Dream Too, a homeless people's organization in Portland, Oregon, US
- Phalanx CIWS, a naval defensive weapon system, nicknamed R2-D2
- Staatstrojaner, a German state-sponsored trojan horse computer program, nicknamed R2-D2
