= Metaparasitylenchus hypothenemi =

Scientific classification
- Kingdom: Animalia
- Phylum: Nematoda
- Class: Secernentea
- Order: Tylenchida
- Family: Allantonematidae
- Genus: Metaparasitylenchus
- Species: M. hypothenemi

Binomial name
- Metaparasitylenchus hypothenemi Poinar Jr., Vega, Castillo, Chavez, and Infante, 2004

Species of roundworm

Metaparasitylenchus hypothenemi (Nematoda: Allantonematidae) is a free-living nematode parasite that infects coffee berry borers (Hypothenemus hampei), small beetles that harm coffee crops worldwide. This nematode has been shown to interfere with the parasitic activity of the coffee berry borer by increasing the mortality of its progeny.

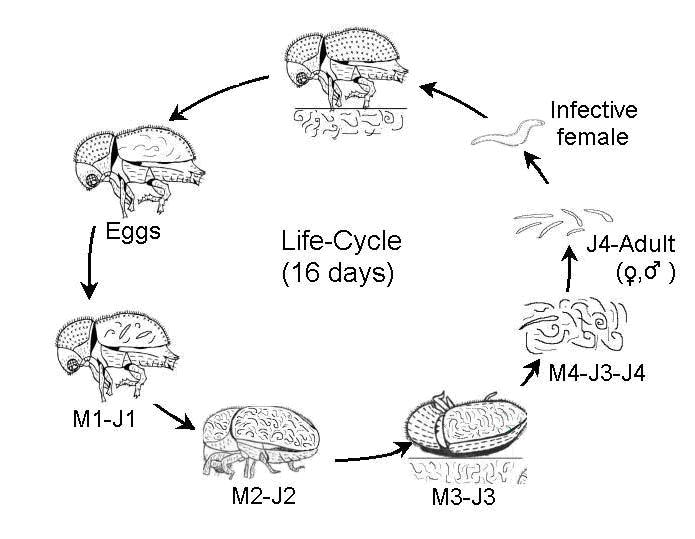
M. hypothenemi life cycle

== Geographical distribution ==
M. hypothenemi has only been identified in coffee plantations in Chiapas, Mexico and Honduras. Its only known host is the coffee berry borer (Hypothenemus hampei), which is originally native to Angola, Africa. This raises the question of whether M. hypothenemi was brought over to the New World with the coffee berry borer or if it is native to Mexico and Central America and only found the coffee berry borer as a host when it was brought to the New World.

== Biocontrol agent ==
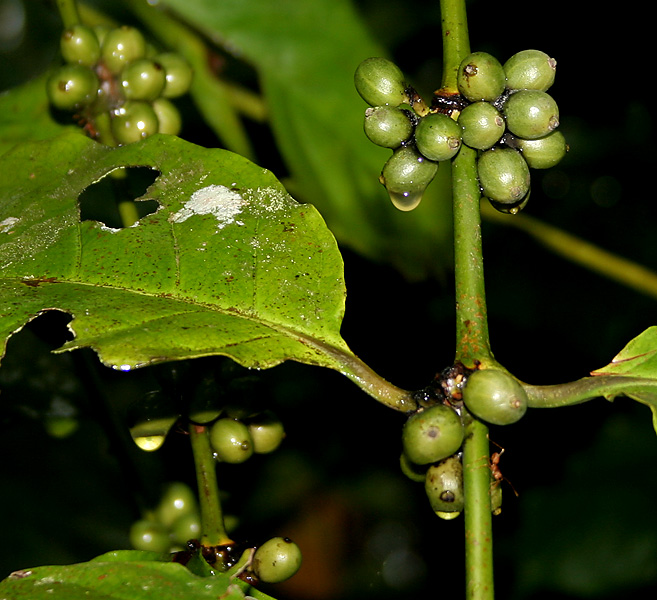
Coffea canephora

In order to alleviate the economic burden the coffee berry borer has on the coffee cash crop, parasitoids of the borer have been used. Most notably Bethylid parasitoids, Eulophyd parasitoids (Eulophidae), and Braconid parasitoids (Braconidae) have been introduced in an attempt to reduce the beetle’s efficacy in destroying coffee plants. However, while these parasitoids improve the situation, they are not successful in eliminating the economic damage. Additionally, evidence suggests that the beetle is capable of developing resistance against the common pesticide endosulfan. Therefore, use of Metaparasitylenchus hypothenemi to induce disease in borer populations has been considered.

It is prudent to explore such a course of action because use of the Metaparasitylenchus hypothenemi nematodes provides a method with which to sterilize female borers. Depending on how many parasitic females are present, sterilization can range from being partially derailed to being completely shut down. Though sterilization fails to ward off a current generation of infection, by arresting the reproductive capabilities of these beetles the worm will ultimately curtail beetle infestation.

Loss of reproductive capabilities through Metaparasitylenchus hypothenemi parasitization is tied to the lifecycle of the nematode. Mature parasitic females are carried through the beetle’s lifecycle. During this time, eggs hatch within the female and proceed through to stage J3 (see Lifecycle) and at this point are ready to exit the host beetle. Exit occurs through the GI tract or the reproductive tract and expulsion involves arrest of the beetle’s own reproductive capabilities.

== See also ==
- Howardula aoronymphium
- Allantonematidae
