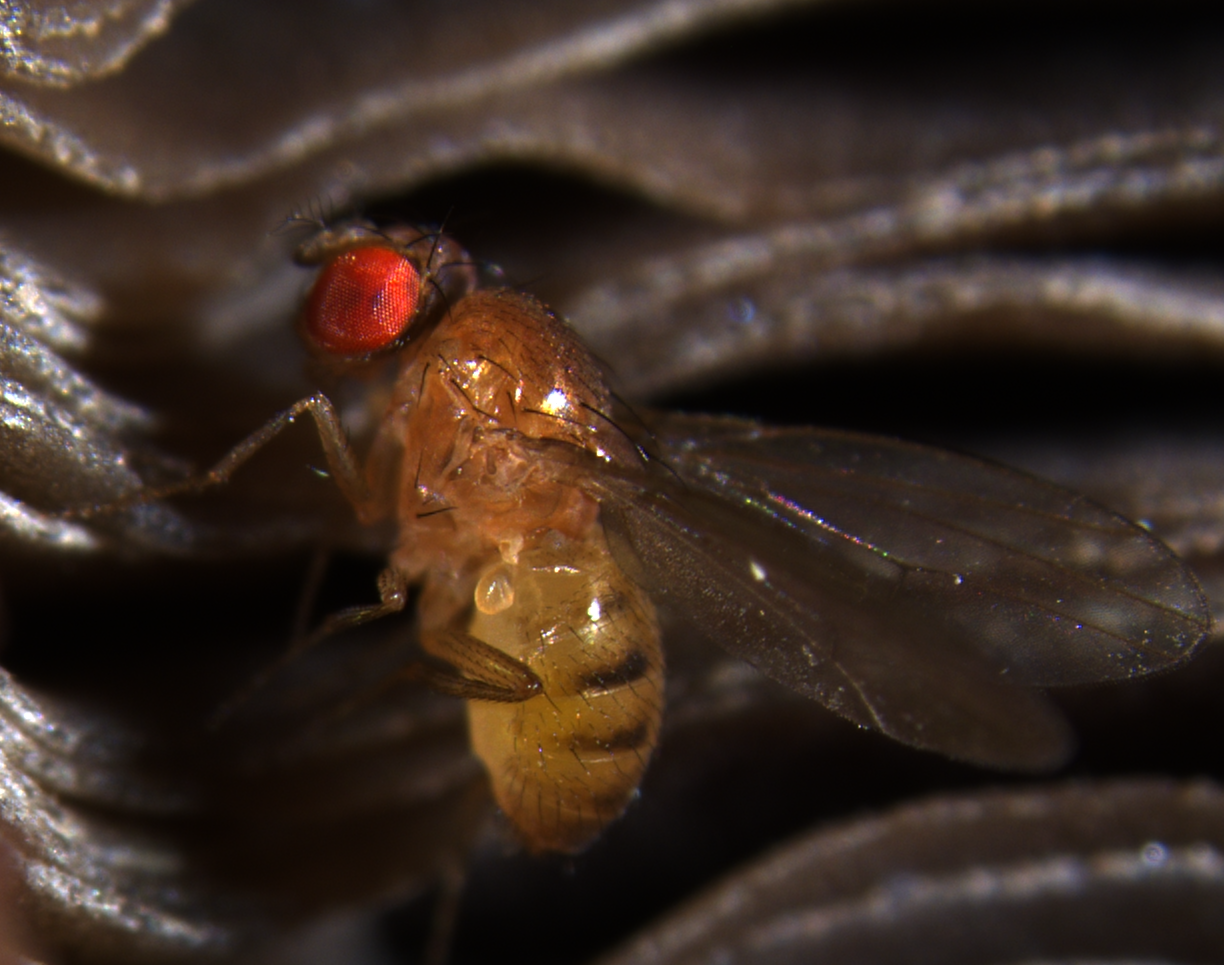
- A D. testacea male

Scientific classification
- Kingdom: Animalia
- Phylum: Arthropoda
- Clade: Pancrustacea
- Class: Insecta
- Order: Diptera
- Family: Drosophilidae
- Subfamily: Drosophilinae
- Genus: Drosophila
- Subgenus: Drosophila
- Species group: testacea
- Species: D. testacea

Binomial name
- Drosophila testacea Grimaldi, James, and Jaenike, 1992

= Drosophila testacea =

Species of fly

Drosophila testacea is a member of the testacea species group of Drosophila. Testacea species are specialist fruit flies that breed on the fruiting bodies of mushrooms. Drosophila testacea can be found in temperate regions of Europe, extending to East Asia. Drosophila testacea and Drosophila orientacea can produce viable hybrids, though they are separated by geography and behavioural barriers. Drosophila testacea females will also readily mate with Drosophila neotestacea males, but viable hybrids are never produced. This hybrid inviability (see Haldane's rule)) may be due to selfish X chromosomes and co-evolved suppressors. Alternately, differences in sex pheromone (e.g. vaccenyl acetate) reception could underlie female readiness and male willingness to copulate.

The antimicrobial peptide gene Diptericin B has been pseudogenized in D. testacea and likely its sister species, D. neotestacea. This was due to a lack of Acetobacter bacteria in its environment, relaxing Natural selection on Diptericin B, which is specifically evolved to combat Acetobacter.

== See also ==
- Drosophila testacea species group
- Meiotic drive
- Haldane's rule
