= Allantonematidae =

- Metaparasitylenchus hypothenemi

Scientific classification
- Kingdom: Animalia
- Phylum: Nematoda
- Class: Chromadorea
- Order: Rhabditida
- Superfamily: Sphaerularioidea
- Family: Allantonematidae; Pereira, 1931

Genera
- Allantonema; Anandranema; Aphelenchulus; Bovienema; Bradynema; Contortylenchus; Formicitylenchus; Halophilanema; Howardula; Metaparasitylenchus; Neoparasitylenchus; Parasitylenchoides; Pratinema; Proparasitylenchus; Sulphuretylenchus; Thripinema

Family of roundworms

A fly infected with Howardula nematodes

Allantonematidae is a family of insect-parasitic nematodes from the order Tylenchida. Allantonematid nematodes infect a variety of insects including beetles, butterflies, flies, thrips, ants, and more. For instance, the nematode Howardula aoronymphium parasitizes mushroom-feeding fruit flies, Formicitylenchus oregonensis parasitizes carpenter ants, and Metaparasitylenchus hypothenemi parasitizes a pest of coffee beans, the coffee berry borer.

Allantonematid nematodes infect insect larvae by piercing through the cuticle, after which they reside in the insect blood. There they develop through multiple juvenile stages before being shed out the anus or reproductive tracts. Mating typically occurs external to the insect host, after which mated female nematodes infect new hosts.

== Agricultural impacts ==
=== Thripinema fuscum ===
Thripinema fuscum is a Allantonematidae nematode that, can naturally decrease the population of Frankliniella fusca, Tobacco thrips. Commonly found in Florida, T. fuscum that infect tobacco thrips have been shown to only affect the reproduction system of the thrips, causing a decrease in thrips over time. Infertility of F. fusca is caused by damage to ovarioles and loss of eggs when infected by T. fuscum. The life cycle of the T. fuscum from infection to the adult life stage is around 9 days in the F. fusca. The infectious nematode lives primarily in the hemocoel of the thrips.

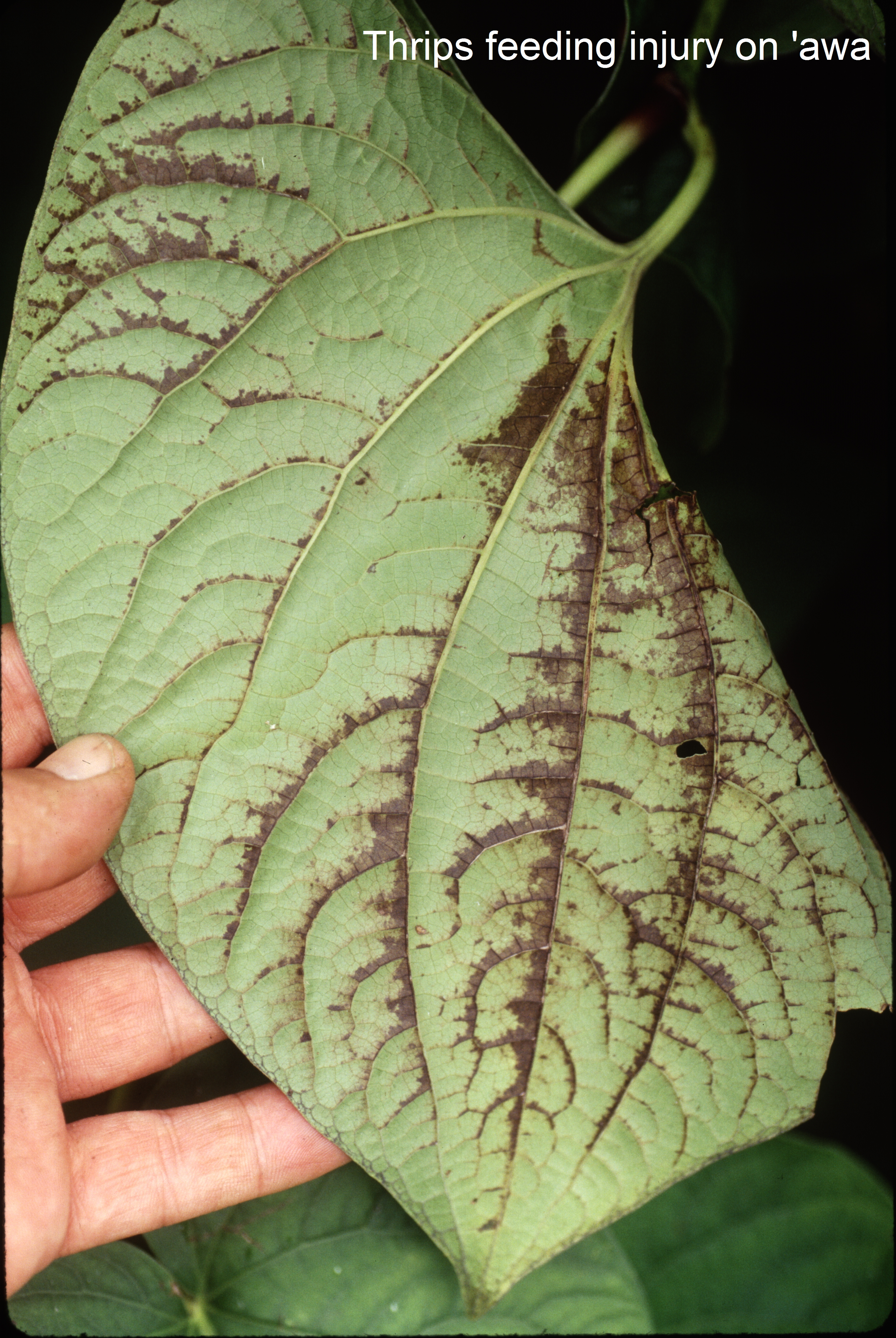
Thrips impact on awa.

=== Parasitylenchus bifurcatus ===
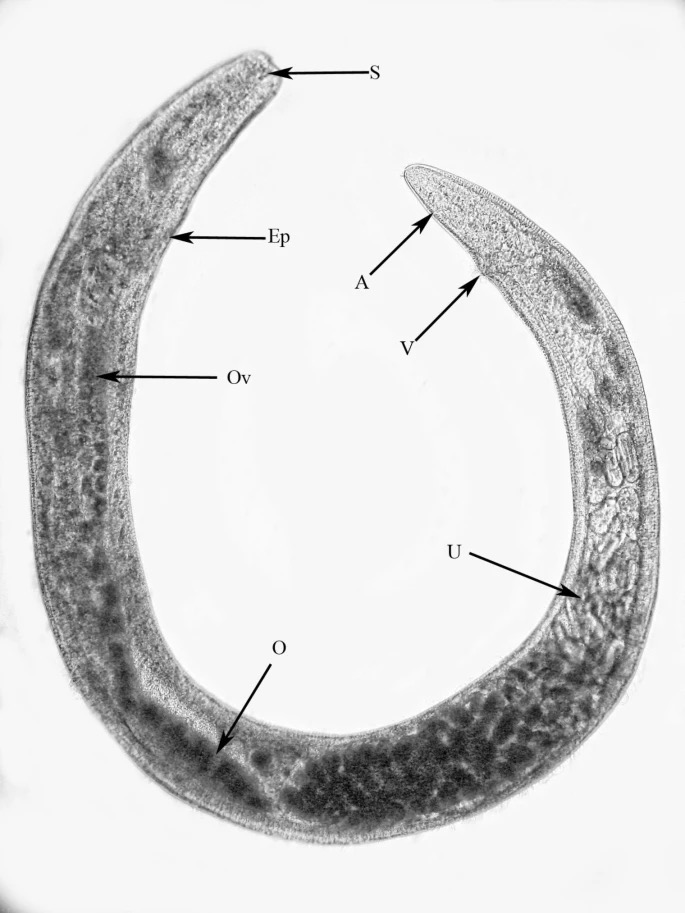
First generation P. bifurcatus female.

Parasitylenchus bifurcatus parasitizes Harmonia axyridis, a beetle introduced to Europe from central and South Asia. H. axyridis affects agricultural crops such as apples, pears, and grapes resulting in reduced quality of products made from these crops. Both male and female H. axyridis can be infected by P. bifurcatus. P. bifurcatus reproduces multiple times within one host, creating multiple generations.

The P. bifurcatus use bodily resources of the H. axyridis, such as fat deposits. The reproductive system of H. axyridismay also be used for reproduction of P. bifurcatus, thus reducing the hosts reproductive organs. Infected H. axyridis put under stress have been shown to die faster than uninfected H. axyridis in the same conditions, increasing the potential to use P. bifurcatus as natural biological control agents.

== Systematics ==
There are 2 subfamilies of Allantonematids that contain about 150 species in at least 16 genera. These include:

- Subfamily Allantonematinae Pereira, 1931
  - Allantonema Leuckhart, 1884
  - Anandranema Poinar, Ferro, Morales & Tesh, 1993
  - Bradynema zur Strassen, 1892
  - Howardula Cobb, 1921
  - Metaparasitylenchus Wachek, 1955
  - Neoparasitylenchus Nickle, 1967
  - Parasitylenchoides Wachek, 1955
  - Pratinema Chizhov & Sturhan, 1998
  - Proparasitylenchus Wachek, 1955
  - Sulphuretylenchus Ruhm, 1956
  - Thripinema Siddiqi, 1986
- Subfamily Contortylenchinae Ruhm, 1956
  - Aphelenchulus Cobb, 1920
  - Bovienema Nickle, 1963
  - Contortylenchus Ruhm, 1956
  - Formicitylenchus Poinar, 2003
- Subfamily not-yet classified
  - Halophilanema Poinar, 2012

The systematics of the Allantonematidae are complicated due to various re-classifications of Allantonematid genera first classified by morphological characters. As a result, the family Allantonematidae is likely paraphyletic, evidenced by molecular study.
