= Hypothenemus crudiae =

Scientific classification
- Kingdom: Animalia
- Phylum: Arthropoda
- Clade: Pancrustacea
- Class: Insecta
- Order: Coleoptera
- Suborder: Polyphaga
- Infraorder: Cucujiformia
- Superfamily: Curculionoidea
- Family: Curculionidae
- Genus: Hypothenemus
- Species: H. crudiae

Binomial name
- Hypothenemus crudiae (Panzer, 1791)

Species of beetle

Hypothenemus crudiae is a species of typical bark beetle in the family Curculionidae. It is found in North America and Europe.
