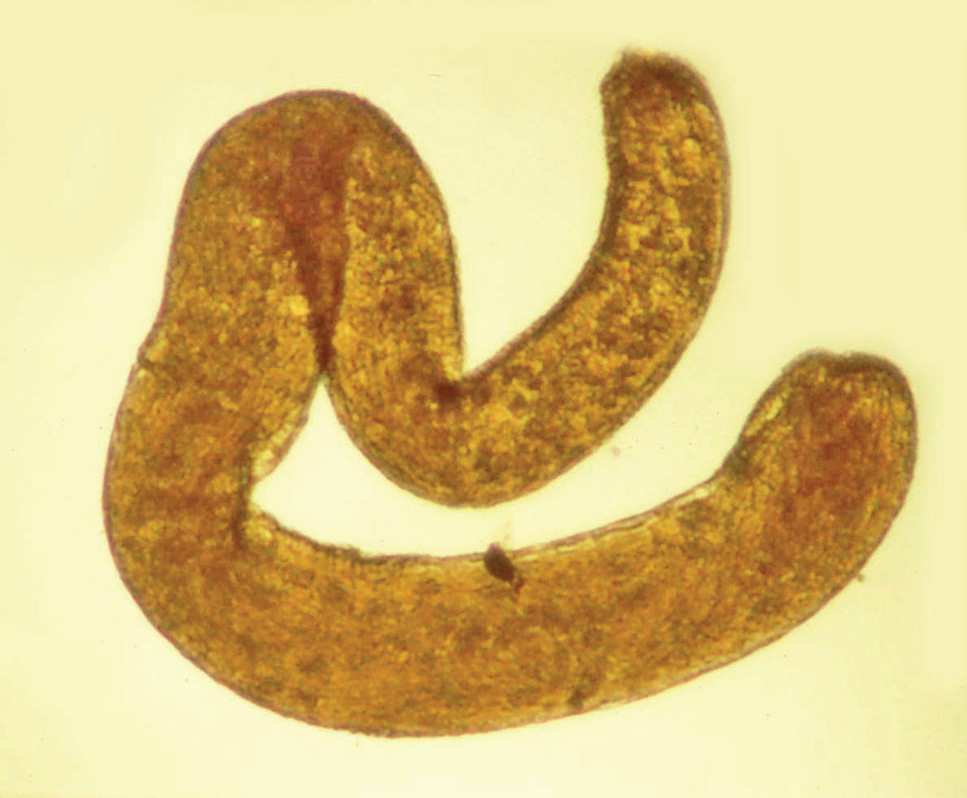
- Formicitylenchus oregonensis

Scientific classification
- Domain: Eukaryota
- Kingdom: Animalia
- Phylum: Nematoda
- Class: Secernentea
- Order: Tylenchida
- Family: Allantonematidae
- Genus: Formicitylenchus; Poinar, 2003
- Species: F. oregonensis

Binomial name
- Formicitylenchus oregonensis Poinar, 2003

= Formicitylenchus =

Genus of roundworms

Formicitylenchus is a monotypic genus of nematodes belonging to the family Allantonematidae. The only species is Formicitylenchus oregonensis.
