= Contortylenchus =

Scientific classification
- Domain: Eukaryota
- Kingdom: Animalia
- Phylum: Nematoda
- Class: Secernentea
- Order: Tylenchida
- Family: Allantonematidae
- Genus: Contortylenchus; Ruhm, 1956

Genus of roundworms

Contortylenchus is a genus of nematodes belonging to the family Allantonematidae.

The species of this genus are found in Japan and Australia.

Species:

- Contortylenchus acuminati Ruhm, 1956
- Contortylenchus amitini Ruhm, 1956
- Contortylenchus cribicolli Ruhm, 1956
- Contortylenchus cryphali Ruhm, 1956
- Contortylenchus cunicularii (Fuchs, 1929)
- Contortylenchus laricis (Fuchs, 1929)
- Contortylenchus proximus Kakuliya, 1967
