= Hypothenemus birmanus =

Scientific classification
- Domain: Eukaryota
- Kingdom: Animalia
- Phylum: Arthropoda
- Class: Insecta
- Order: Coleoptera
- Suborder: Polyphaga
- Infraorder: Cucujiformia
- Family: Curculionidae
- Genus: Hypothenemus
- Species: H. birmanus

Binomial name
- Hypothenemus birmanus (Eichhoff, 1878)

Species of beetle

Hypothenemus birmanus, the kiawe scolytid, is a species of typical bark beetle in the family Curculionidae. It is found in North America.
