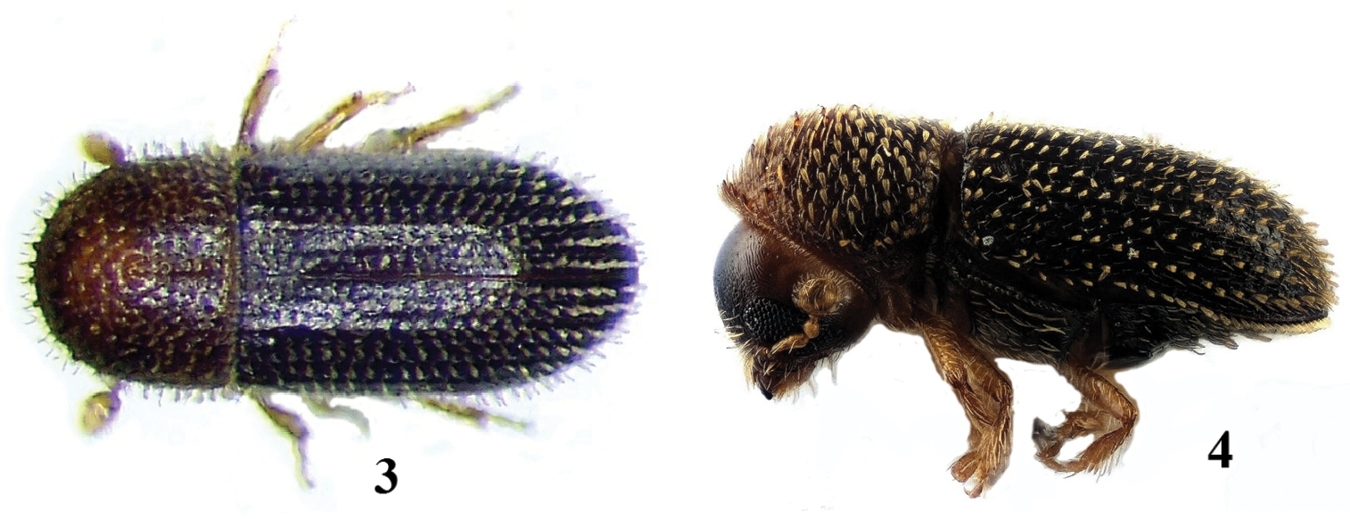

Scientific classification
- Kingdom: Animalia
- Phylum: Arthropoda
- Clade: Pancrustacea
- Class: Insecta
- Order: Coleoptera
- Suborder: Polyphaga
- Infraorder: Cucujiformia
- Family: Curculionidae
- Genus: Hypothenemus
- Species: H. eruditus

Binomial name
- Hypothenemus eruditus Westwood, 1836

= Hypothenemus eruditus =

Species of beetle

Hypothenemus eruditus is a species of typical bark beetle in the family Curculionidae. It is found in North America, temperate Asia, and Europe.
