= Neoparasitylenchus =

Scientific classification
- Domain: Eukaryota
- Kingdom: Animalia
- Phylum: Nematoda
- Class: Secernentea
- Order: Tylenchida
- Family: Allantonematidae
- Genus: Neoparasitylenchus; Nickle, 1967

Genus of roundworms

Neoparasitylenchus is a genus of nematodes belonging to the family Allantonematidae.

Species:

- Neoparasitylenchus betulae (Ruhm, 1956)
- Neoparasitylenchus chalcographi (Fuchs, 1938)
- Neoparasitylenchus cinerei (Fuchs, 1929)
- Neoparasitylenchus cryphali (Fuchs, 1914)
- Neoparasitylenchus hylastis (Wulker, 1923)
- Neoparasitylenchus ligniperdae (Fuchs, 1929)
- Neoparasitylenchus notati (Fuchs, 1929)
- Neoparasitylenchus orthotomici (Ruhm, 1960)
- Neoparasitylenchus pessoni (Ruhm, 1957)
- Neoparasitylenchus pityophthori (Ruhm, 1956)
- Neoparasitylenchus poligraphi (Fuchs, 1938)
- Neoparasitylenchus scolyti (Oldham, 1930)
- Neoparasitylenchus wuelkeri (Ruhm, 1956)
