= Drosophila putrida =

Scientific classification
- Domain: Eukaryota
- Kingdom: Animalia
- Phylum: Arthropoda
- Class: Insecta
- Order: Diptera
- Family: Drosophilidae
- Subfamily: Drosophilinae
- Genus: Drosophila
- Subgenus: Drosophila
- Species group: testacea
- Species: D. putrida

Binomial name
- Drosophila putrida Sturtevant, 1916

Species of fly

Drosophila putrida is a species of fruit fly in the family Drosophilidae. It is found throughout the temperate central-eastern United States. Like other members of the Drosophila testacea species group, D. putrida breeds exclusively on mushrooms.
