= Howardula aoronymphium =

Scientific classification
- Kingdom: Animalia
- Phylum: Nematoda
- Class: Secernentea
- Order: Tylenchida
- Family: Allantonematidae
- Genus: Howardula
- Species: H. aoronymphium

Binomial name
- Howardula aoronymphium Welch, 1959

Species of roundworm

Dissected Drosophila falleni infected with juvenile Howardula aoronymphium nematodes

Howardula aoronymphium is a species of nematode that infects specialist mushroom-feeding fruit flies such as Drosophila falleni and Drosophila neotestacea. Mated female nematodes pierce the fly larva cuticle and take up residence in the hemolymph (insect blood) where they mature alongside the fly. When the adult fly ecloses, the nematode motherworm has reached full size and sheds juvenile nematodes into the hemolymph which are eventually excreted by either the fly anus or ovipositor. Howardula nematodes can severely impact fly egg development, as infection can effectively sterilize some species.

Howardula aoronymphium are attracted to mushroom sites by cuing in on specific odourants that are common in rotting mushrooms. However the odourants that attract H. aoronymphium to mushrooms are different from the odours that attract its fly host D. falleni. Yet when D. falleni are infected by H. aoronymphium, their olfactory preferences differ. Infected flies become more averse to acetate-containing compounds such as ethyl acetate or propyl acetate. Conversely, infected flies become more attracted to 1-nonanol.

Howardula aoronymphium can be compared to other insect-infecting nematodes such as Steinernema and Heterorhabiditis. These nematodes are used as biological control agents, as they efficiently kill their insect prey within days after infection. However unlike these nematodes, Howardula aoronymphium requires its host fly to survive into adulthood, and does not increase larval mortality. Moreover Howardula aoronymphium is quite specific to mushroom-feeding flies, while other insect-infecting nematodes can be more generalist worms capable of infecting a wide variety of insects.

The inherited bacterial symbiont Spiroplasma poulsonii can defend flies against Howardula infection by attacking the nematodes using toxins analogous to sarcin or ricin.

== See also ==
- Metaparasitylenchus hypothenemi
- Allantonematidae
