= Metaparasitylenchus =

Scientific classification
- Domain: Eukaryota
- Kingdom: Animalia
- Phylum: Nematoda
- Class: Secernentea
- Order: Tylenchida
- Family: Allantonematidae
- Genus: Metaparasitylenchus; Wachek, 1955

Genus of nematodes

Metaparasitylenchus is a genus of nematodes belonging to the family Allantonematidae.

Species:

- Metaparasitylenchus boopini Wachek, 1955
- Metaparasitylenchus cossoni Wulker, 1929
- Metaparasitylenchus cryptophagi Wachek, 1955
- Metaparasitylenchus helmidis Wachek, 1955
- Metaparasitylenchus mycetophagi Wachek, 1955
- Metaparasitylenchus oschei Ruhm, 1956
- Metaparasitylenchus rhizophagi Wachek, 1955
- Metaparasitylenchus strangaliae Wachek, 1955
- Metaparasitylenchus telmatophili Wachek, 1955
- Metaparasitylenchus tetropii Wachek, 1955
