= Howardula =

Scientific classification
- Domain: Eukaryota
- Kingdom: Animalia
- Phylum: Nematoda
- Class: Secernentea
- Order: Tylenchida
- Family: Allantonematidae
- Genus: Howardula; Cobb, 1921

Genus of roundworms

Dissected Drosophila falleni infected with Howardula aoronymphium nematodes

Howardula is a genus of nematode that infests the larvae of mushroom-feeding flies, beetles, and other insects. Various Howardula species and strains infest mushroom-feeding Drosophila, including Howardula aoronymphium and Howardula neocosmis. Howardula husseyi can infest the mushroom phorid Megaselia halterata.

== Life cycle ==
The life cycle of Howardula nematodes begins inside the host fly, where infective juvenile nematodes are released by either the fly anus or ovipositor onto mushrooms. There, the juvenile nematodes mature and mate. Mated females will then pierce the cuticle of a fly larva using a specialized stylet, and enter the fly hemolymph (insect blood) where the nematode resides. Over the course of the fly host's metamorphosis, the female nematode matures into an adult stage called the motherworm. After the adult fly emerges from its pupa, the motherworm begins releasing juvenile nematodes directly into the hemocoel, renewing the cycle.

Other insect-infecting nematodes such as Steinernema and Heterorhabiditis are used as biological control agents, as they efficiently kill their insect prey. However Howardula species require their hosts to survive into adulthood. As such, while Howardula infects insects like other nematode parasites, the "goals" of these nematodes differs drastically, leading to distinct host-parasite interactions.

== See also ==
- Howardula aoronymphium
