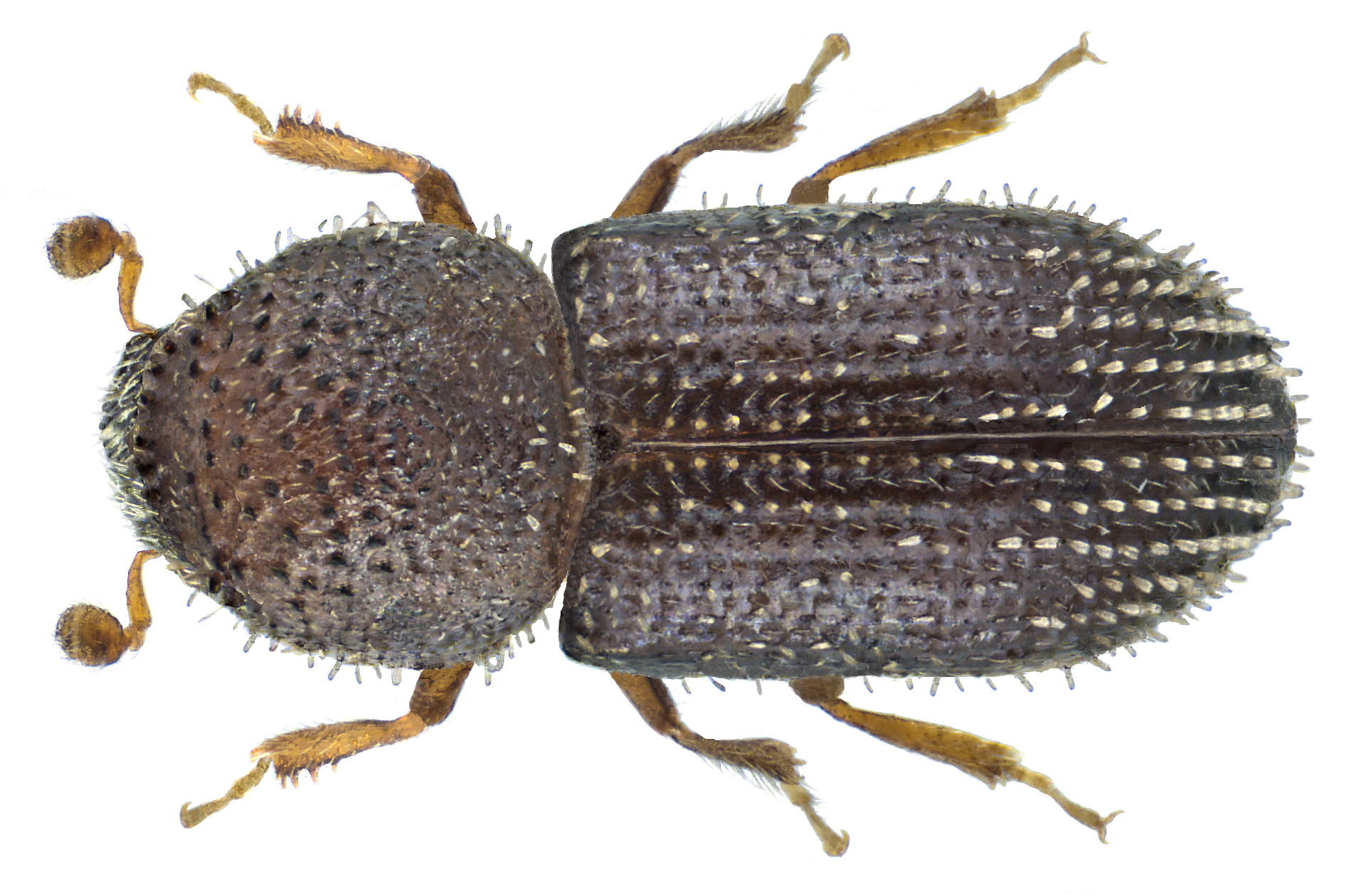

Scientific classification
- Domain: Eukaryota
- Kingdom: Animalia
- Phylum: Arthropoda
- Class: Insecta
- Order: Coleoptera
- Suborder: Polyphaga
- Infraorder: Cucujiformia
- Family: Curculionidae
- Genus: Hypothenemus
- Species: H. seriatus

Binomial name
- Hypothenemus seriatus Wood & Bright, 1992

= Hypothenemus seriatus =

Species of beetle

Hypothenemus seriatus is a species of typical bark beetle in the family Curculionidae.
