= R2d2 (mouse gene) =

Gene in mice

R2d2 (Responder to meiotic drive 2) is a mouse genomic locus that is sometimes a selfish region. It is a stretch of DNA on mouse chromosome 2 that contains multiple copies of the Cwc22 gene. When seven or more copies of that latter gene are present, R2d2 becomes selfish. High-copy R2d2 does not distort inheritance equally in all genetic backgrounds; transmission from heterozygous females has been reported from Mendelian 50 percent to 95 percent, suggesting that unlinked modifier loci affect drive strength. It is a segmental duplication of the ancestral R2d1 locus.

R2d2 was discovered by UNC School of Medicine researchers to display transmission bias. In one lab breeding population, in a selective sweep, R2d2 increased from being in 50 percent of the lab mice's chromosomes to 85 percent in 10 generations. By 15 generations, it reached fixation.

R2d2 has spread in the wild to several parts of the world. It achieves the meiotic drive effect by biasing meiosis so that it ends up in the egg, not the polar body. If it fails to be the only chromosome 2 in the egg, it sabotages the egg by causing aneuploidy, so that the egg contains both the chromosome 2 with R2d2 and the one without -- leading to the death of any embryo produced from that egg.

== See also ==
- gene drive
- Homing endonuclease gene
