= Haldane's rule =

Observation in evolutionary biology

In humans, barring intersex conditions causing aneuploidy and other unusual states, it is the male that is heterogametic, with XY sex chromosomes.

Haldane's rule is an observation about the early stage of speciation, formulated in 1922 by the British evolutionary biologist J. B. S. Haldane, that states that if—in a species hybrid—only one sex is inviable or sterile, that sex is more likely to be the heterogametic sex. The heterogametic sex is the one with two different sex chromosomes; in therian mammals, (Note: Unlike other mammals, monotremes have more than two different sex chromosomes. The platypus has five pairs. Short-beaked echidnas have four pairs plus one female-only chromosome.) for example, this is the male.

== Overview ==
Haldane himself described the rule as:

When in the F1 offspring of two different animal races one sex is absent, rare, or sterile, that sex is the heterozygous sex (heterogametic sex).

Haldane's rule applies to the vast majority of species that have heterogametic chromosomal sex determination (e.g. XX females vs. XY males, or ZW females vs. ZZ males).

The rule includes both male heterogametic (XY or XO-type sex determination, such as found in mammals and Drosophila fruit flies) and female heterogametic (ZW or Z0-type sex determination, as found in birds and butterflies), and some dioecious plants such as campions.

Hybrid dysfunction (sterility and inviability) is a major form of post-zygotic reproductive isolation, which occurs in early stages of speciation. Evolution can produce a similar pattern of isolation in a vast array of different organisms. However, the actual mechanisms leading to Haldane's rule in different taxa remain largely undefined.

== Hypotheses ==
Many different hypotheses have been advanced to address the evolutionary mechanisms to produce Haldane's rule. Currently, the most popular explanation for Haldane's rule is the composite hypothesis, which divides Haldane's rule into multiple subdivisions, including sterility, inviability, male heterogamety, and female heterogamety. The composite hypothesis states that Haldane's rule in different subdivisions has different causes. Individual genetic mechanisms may not be mutually exclusive, and these mechanisms may act together to cause Haldane's rule in any given subdivision. In contrast to these views that emphasize genetic mechanisms, another view hypothesizes that population dynamics during population divergence may cause Haldane's rule.

The main genetic hypotheses are:

- Dominance: Heterogametic hybrids are affected by all X-linked alleles (be they recessive or dominant) causing incompatibilities due to divergent alleles being brought together. However, homogametic hybrids are only affected by dominant deleterious X-linked alleles. Heterogametic hybrids, which carry only a single copy of a given X-linked gene, will be affected by mutations regardless of dominance. Thus, an X-linked incompatibility between diverging populations is more likely to be expressed in the heterogametic sex than in the homogametic sex.
- The "faster male": Male genes are thought to evolve faster due to sexual selection. As a result, male sterility becomes more evident in male heterogametic taxa (XY sex determination). This hypothesis conflicts with Haldane's rule in male homogametic taxa, in which females are more affected by hybrid inferiority. It therefore only applies to male sterility in taxa with XY sex determination, according to the composite theory.
- Meiotic drive: In hybrid populations, selfish genetic elements inactivate sperm cells (i.e.: an X-linked drive factor inactivates a Y-bearing sperm and vice versa).
- The "faster X": Genes on hemizygous chromosomes may evolve more quickly by enhancing selection on possible recessive alleles causing a larger effect in reproductive isolation.
- Differential selection: Hybrid incompatibilities affecting the heterogametic sex and homogametic sex are fundamentally different isolating mechanisms, which makes heterogametic inferiority (sterility/inviability) more visible or preserved in nature.

Data from multiple phylogenetic groups support a combination of dominance and faster X-chromosome theories. However, it has recently been argued that dominance theory can not explain Haldane's rule in marsupials since both sexes experience the same incompatibilities due to paternal X-inactivation in females.

The dominance hypothesis is the core of the composite theory, and X-linked recessive/dominance effects have been demonstrated in many cases to cause hybrid incompatibilities. There is also supporting evidence for the faster male and meiotic drive hypotheses. For example, a significant reduction of male-driven gene flow is observed in Asian elephants, suggesting faster evolution of male traits.

Although the rule was initially stated in context of diploid organisms with chromosomal sex determination, it has recently been argued that it can be extended to certain species lacking chromosomal sex determination, such as haplodiploids and hermaphrodites.

== Exceptions ==
In some instances, the homogametic sex turns out to be inviable while the heterogametic sex is viable and fertile. This is seen in the Drosophila melanogaster species subgroup, where an X-chromosomal Zhr repeat sequence prevents chromosome segregation during mitosis in hybrids. Differentially acquired meiotic drives also play a role in these flies.
