= Meiotic drive =

Preferential transmission of alleles over others during meiosis

Meiotic drive is a type of intragenomic conflict, whereby one or more loci within a genome will affect a manipulation of the meiotic process in such a way as to favor the transmission of one or more alleles over another, regardless of its phenotypic expression. More simply, meiotic drive is when one copy of a gene is passed on to offspring more than the expected 50% of the time. According to Buckler et al., "Meiotic drive is the subversion of meiosis so that particular genes are preferentially transmitted to the progeny. Meiotic drive generally causes the preferential segregation of small regions of the genome".

== Meiotic drive in plants ==
The first report of meiotic drive came from Marcus Rhoades who in 1942 observed a violation of Mendelian segregation ratios for the R locus - a gene controlling the production of the purple pigment anthocyanin in maize kernels - in a maize line carrying abnormal chromosome 10 (Ab10). Ab10 differs from the normal chromosome 10 by the presence of a 150-base pair heterochromatic region called 'knob', which functions as a centromere during division (hence called 'neocentromere') and moves to the spindle poles faster than the centromeres during meiosis I and II. The mechanism for this was later found to involve the activity of a kinesin-14 gene called Kinesin driver (Kindr). Kindr protein is a functional minus-end directed motor, displaying quicker minus-end directed motility than an endogenous kinesin-14, such as Kin11. As a result Kindr outperforms the endogenous kinesins, pulling the 150 bp knobs to the poles faster than the centromeres and causing Ab10 to be preferentially inherited during meiosis

== Meiotic drive in fungi ==
Meiotic drive in fungi often takes the form of spore killers: selfish genetic elements that increase their transmission during sexual reproduction by killing spores that don’t carry the spore killer element. This is reminiscent of the toxin-antitoxin system in bacteria where a genetic element encodes both a toxin and the antitoxin at the same time. Spores that inherit the driver are therefore protected from its own toxin, while spores that never inherited the genetic element, or whose antitoxin stops functioning, gets aborted. Examples include the wtf gene family in Schizosaccharomyces pombe, the Sk-1, Sk-2, and Sk-3 systems of Neurospora and the Spok genes of Podospora anserina. Each of these systems bias inheritance through the selective survival of spores associated with the driver, though they differ in their genetic complexity.

Podospora anserina also has a distinct prion-based meiotic drive system involving het alleles, a heterokaryon incompatibility system which results in regulated cell death when cells from strains carrying incompatible alleles fuse, in this case, het-s and het-S carrying strains. HET-s proteins from prion infected, maternally inherited het-s strains induce toxic activity in HET-S proteins by causing a conformational change which activates pore-formation in the cell membrane. This leads to cell death in het-S spores while the het-s spores survive, resulting in a biased transmission of the het-s allele.

== Meiotic drive in animals ==
The unequal inheritance of gametes has been observed since the 1950s, in contrast to Gregor Mendel's First and Second Laws (the law of segregation and the law of independent assortment), which dictate that there is a random chance of each allele being passed on to offspring. Examples of selfish drive genes in animals have primarily been found in rodents and flies. These drive systems could play important roles in the process of speciation. For instance, the proposal that hybrid sterility (Haldane's rule) may arise from the divergent evolution of sex chromosome drivers and their suppressors.

=== Meiotic drive in mice ===
Early observations of mouse t-haplotypes by Mary Lyon described numerous genetic loci on chromosome 17 that suppress X-chromosome sex ratio distortion. If a driver is left unchecked, this may lead to population extinction as the population would fix for the driver (e.g. a selfish X chromosome), removing the Y chromosome (and therefore males) from the population. The idea that meiotic drivers and their suppressors may govern speciation is supported by observations that mouse Y chromosomes lacking certain genetic loci produce female-biased offspring, implying these loci encode suppressors of drive. Moreover, matings of certain mouse strains used in research results in unequal offspring ratios. One gene responsible for sex ratio distortion in mice is r2d2 (responder to meiotic drive 2), which predicts which strains of mice can successfully breed without offspring sex ratio distortion.

=== Meiotic drive in flies ===
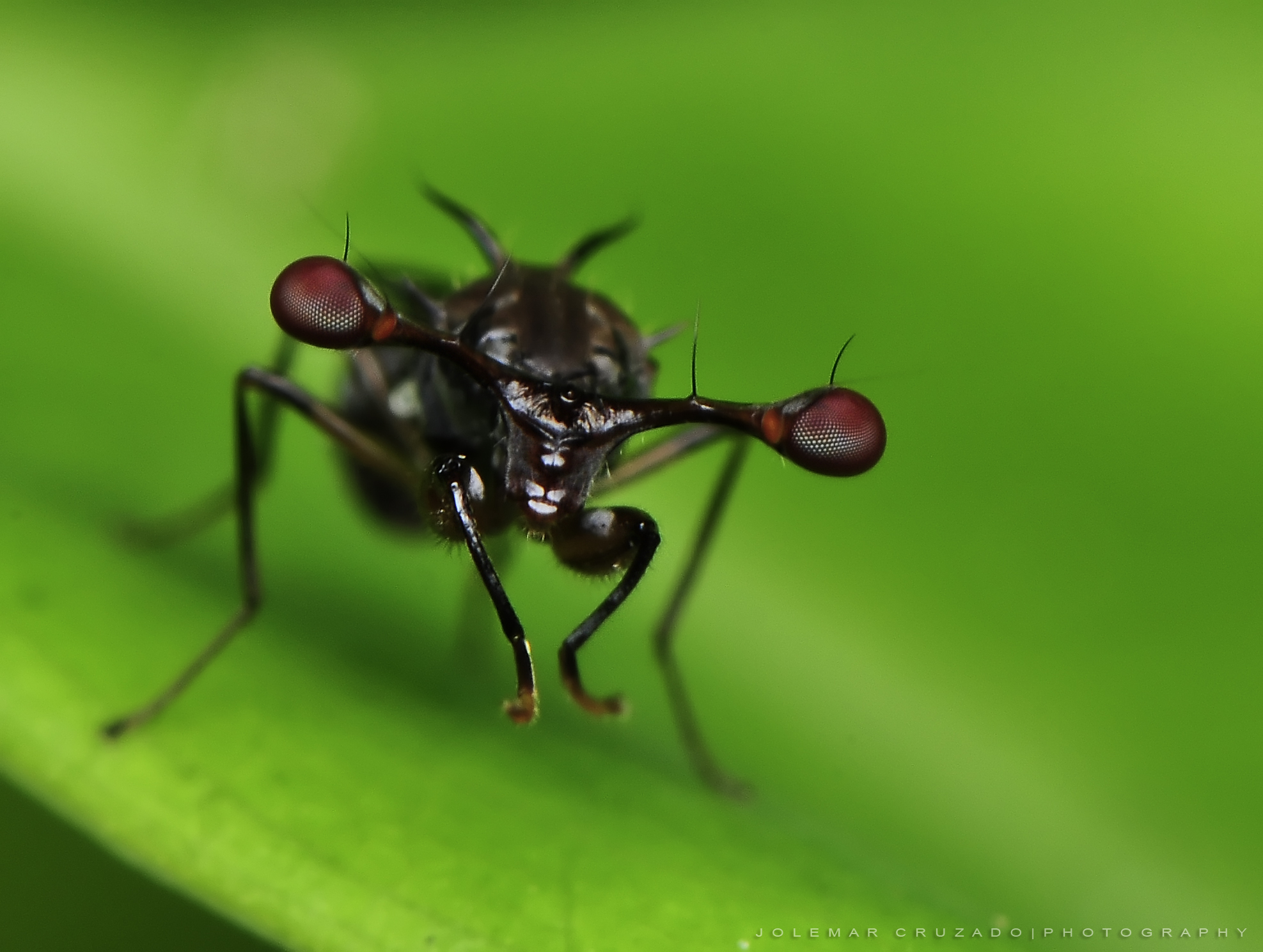
A stalk-eyed fly

Selfish chromosomes of stalk-eyed flies have had ecological consequences. Driving X chromosomes lead to reductions in male fecundity and mating success, leading to frequency dependent selection maintaining both the driving alleles and wild-type alleles.

Multiple species of fruit fly are known to have driving X chromosomes, of which the best-characterized are found in Drosophila simulans. Three independent driving X chromosomes are known in D. simulans, called Paris, Durham, and Winters. In Paris, the driving gene encodes a DNA modelling protein ("heterochromatin protein 1 D2" or HP1D2), where the allele of the driving copy fails to prepare the male Y chromosome for meiosis. In Winters, the gene responsible ("Distorter on the X" or Dox) has been identified, though the mechanism by which it acts is still unknown. The strong selective pressure imposed by these driving X chromosomes has given rise to suppressors of drive, of which the genes are somewhat known for Winters, Durham, and Paris. These suppressors encode hairpin RNAs which match the sequence of driver genes (such as Dox), leading host RNA interference pathways to degrade Dox sequence.

Autosomal suppressors of drive are known in Drosophila mediopunctata, Drosophila paramelanica, Drosophila quinaria, and Drosophila testacea, emphasizing the importance of these drive systems in natural populations.

Drosophila melanogaster (Dmel) bears the autosomal segregation distorter (SD) system and the X-chromosomal Stellate system. SD causes segregation defects in heterozygotes. Stellate causes the death of male spermatids unless they express a suppressor found on the Dmel Y chromosome. Defects and deaths caused by drive systems is also a cause of hybrid incompatibility.

== See also ==
- Fixed allele
