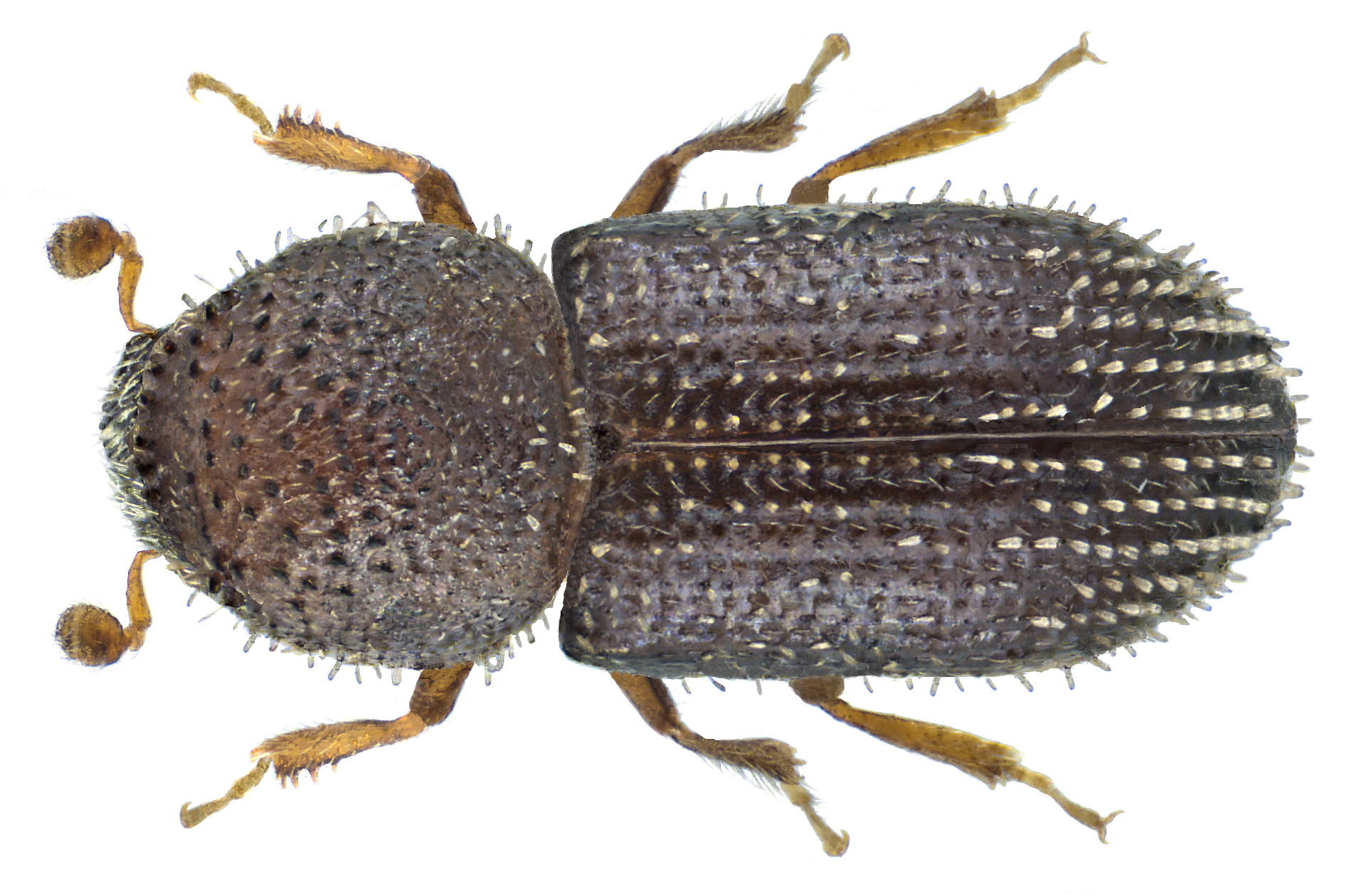
- Hypothenemus seriatus

Scientific classification
- Kingdom: Animalia
- Phylum: Arthropoda
- Class: Insecta
- Order: Coleoptera
- Suborder: Polyphaga
- Infraorder: Cucujiformia
- Family: Curculionidae
- Subfamily: Scolytinae
- Tribe: Cryphalini
- Subtribe: Cryphalina
- Genus: Hypothenemus; Westwood, 1836

Diversity
- at least 280 species

= Hypothenemus =

Genus of beetles

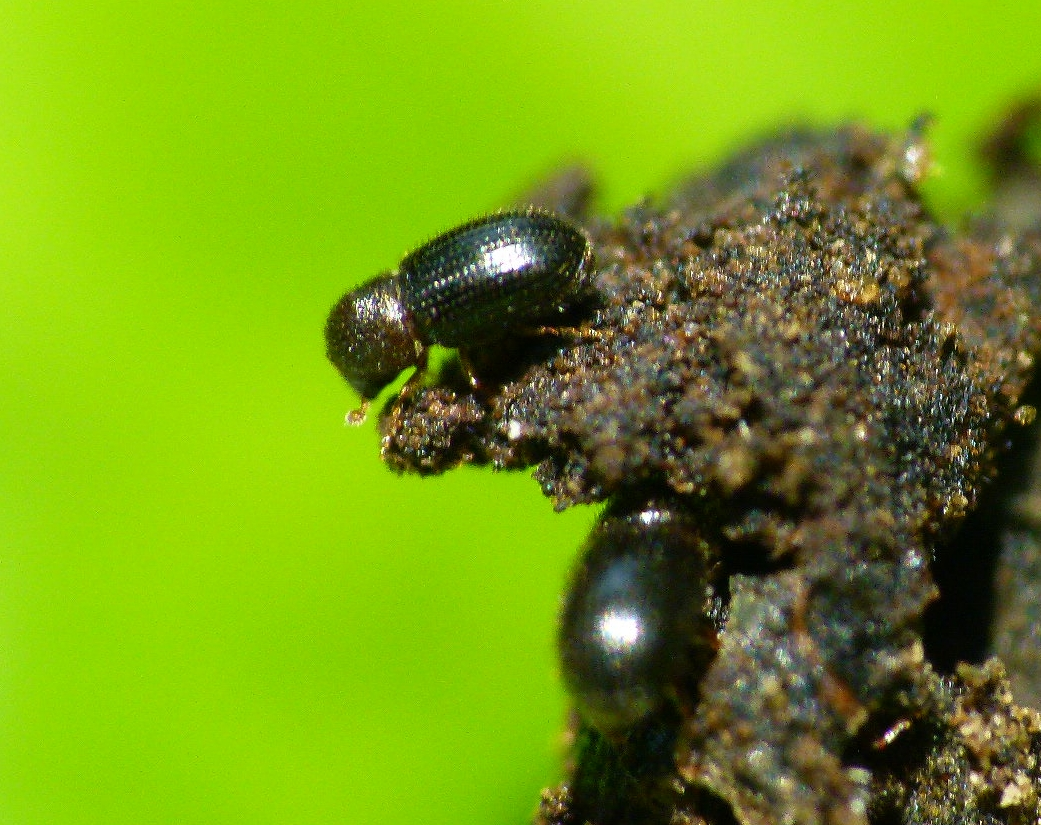
Hypothenemus hampei

Hypothenemus is a genus of bark beetles in the family Curculionidae. There are more than 200 described species in Hypothenemus. They are common in tropical and subtropical areas worldwide, and found less often in temperate areas of eastern North America and eastern Asia. The small beetles are typically 0.6 mm to 2.2 mm in length, males smaller than females.

== See also ==
- List of Hypothenemus species
