= List of sequenced animal genomes =

This list of sequenced animal genomes contains animal species for which complete genome sequences have been assembled, annotated and published. Substantially complete draft genomes are included, but not partial genome sequences or organelle-only sequences. For all kingdoms, see the list of sequenced genomes.

== Porifera (Sponges) ==
Family	Species	Assembly Name	Genome Size	Number of Predicted Genes	Reference	Assembly status

- Amphimedon queenslandica, a sponge (2009)
- Stylissa carteri (2016)
- Ephydatia muelleri (2020)
- Xestospongia testudinaria (2016)

== Ctenophora ==
Family	Species	Assembly Name	Genome Size	Number of Predicted Genes	Reference	Assembly status

- Mnemiopsis leidyi (Ctenophora), (order Lobata) (2012/2013)
- Hormiphora californensis (Ctenophora) (2021)
- Pleurobrachia bachei (Ctenophora) (2014)
- Bolinopsis microptera(Ctenophora) (2022)

== Placozoa ==
Family	Species	Assembly Name	Genome Size	Number of Predicted Genes	Reference	Assembly status
Trichoplacidae	Trichoplax adhaerens	N/A	105.63 Mbp	11,304	2008 draft	BUSCO: Unknown; Scaffold level assembly; Scaffold N50: 6 Mbp; Contig N50: 204.2 Kbp; 8.1x genome coverage
Hoilungidae	Hoilungia hongkongensis	TrispH2_1.0	94.88 Mbp	12,225	2018 draft	BUSCO: Unknown; Scaffold level assembly; Scoffold N50: 376.3 Kbp; Contig N50: 91.9 Kbp; 80.0x genome coverage

== Cnidaria ==
Family	Species	Assembly Name	Genome Size	Number of Predicted Genes	Reference	Assembly status

- Hydra vulgaris, (previously Hydra magnipapillata), a model hydrozoan (2010)
- Nematostella vectensis, a model sea anemone (starlet sea anemone) (2007)
- Aiptasia pallida, a sea anemone (2015)
- Renilla muelleri, an octocoral (2017, 2019)
- Stylophora pistillata, a coral (2017)
- Aurelia aurita, moon jellyfish (2019)
- Clytia hemisphaerica, Hydrozoan jellyfish (2019)
- Myxobolus honghuensis (2022)
- Nemopilema nomurai, Nomura jellyfish (2019)
- Rhopilema esculentum, Flame jellyfish (2020)
- Cassiopea xamachana (Scyphozoa) (2019)
- Alatina alata (Cubozoa) (2019)
- Calvadosia cruxmelitensis (Staurozoa) (2019)
- Dendronephthya gigantea, an octocoral (2019)
- Acropora acuminata (2020)
- Acropora awi (2020)
- Acropora cytherea, Table coral (2020)
- Acropora digitifera, a coral (2011)
- Acropora echinata (2020)
- Acropora florida, branching staghorn coral(2020)
- Acropora gemmifera (2021)
- Acropora hyacinthus, Brush coral (2020)
- Acropora intermedia, Noble Staghorn Coral (2020)
- Acropora microphthalma (2020)
- Acropora muricata, Staghorn coral (2020)
- Acropora nasta, branching staghorn coral (2020)
- Acropora pulchra (2025)
- Acropora selago, Green Selago Acropora (2020)
- Acropora tenuis, Purple Tipped Acropora (2020)
- Acropora yongei ,Yonge's staghorn coral (2020)
- Corallium rubrum, Precious coral (2024)
- Astreopora myriophthalma, Porous star coral (2020)
- Lophelia pertusa, Deepwater White Coral (2023)
- Montipora cactus (2020)
- Montipora capitata, Rice coral (2022)
- Montipora efflorescens, Velvet coral (2020)
- Orbicella faveolata, mountainous star coral (2016)
- Paragorgia papillata, Bubble-gum coral (2025)
- Pocillopora acuta, Hosoeda Hanayasai coral (2022)
- Pocillopora damicornis, cauliflower coral (2018)
- Pocillopora meandrina, Cauliflower coral (2022)
- Porites astreoides, Mustard hill coral (2022)
- Porites compressa, Finger coral (2022)

== Hemichordata ==
=== Order Enteropneusta (Acorn Worms) ===
Family	Species	Assembly Name	Genome Size	Number of Predicted Genes	Reference	Assembly status
Ptychoderidae	Ptychodera flava	AS_Pfla_20210202	1.16 Gbp	38,920	2024 draft	BUSCO: 91.1% single copy; Chromosome scale, aligned to 22 pseudochromosomes (22 somatic), no mitochondrial chromosome; Scaffold N50: 44.0 Mbp; Contig N50: 6.5 Mbp; 60.0x genome coverage
Spengelidae	Glandiceps talaboti	keGlaTala1.1	590.49 Mbp	N/A	2024 draft	BUSCO: Unknown; Chromosome scale, aligned to 24 pseudochromosomes (23 somatic + mitochondrial); Scaffold N50: 21.5 Mbp; Contig N50: 6.1 Mbp; 62.0x genome coverage

== Echinodermata ==
Family	Species	Assembly Name	Genome Size	Number of Predicted Genes	Reference	Assembly status

- Acanthaster planci, starfish (2014)
- Apostichopus japonicus, sea cucumber (2017)
- Arbacia lixula, black sea urchin (2024)
- Astropecten irregularis, sand sea star (2024)
- Australostichopus mollis, Australian sea cucumber (2016)
- Chiridota hydrothermica, deep sea cucumber (2024)
- Diadema setosum, Long-spined sea urchin (2024)
- Echinometra lucunter, rock boring urchin (2023)
- Ophionereis fasciata, mottled brittlestar (2016)
- Patiriella regularis, the New Zealand common cushion star (2016)
- Plazaster borealis, Octopus starfish (2022)
- Strongylocentrotus purpuratus, a sea urchin and model deuterostome (2006)

== Cephalocordata (Lancelets) ==
Family	Species	Assembly Name	Genome Size	Number of Predicted Genes	Reference	Assembly status
Branchiostomidae	Asymmetron lucayanum	Asyluc0.1	460.59 Mbp	N/A	2016 draft	BUSCO: Unknown; Scaffold level assembly; Scaffold N50: 3.2 Kbp; Contig N50: 2.0 Kbp; 75.0x genome coverage
Branchiostomidae	Branchiostoma belcheri (Belcher's lancelet)	CUHK_Bbel	478.32 Mbp	44,747	2022 draft	BUSCO: Unknown; Scaffold level assembly; Scaffold N50: 4.2 Mbp; Contig N50: 2.5 Mbp; 192.0x genome coverage
Branchiostomidae	Branchiostoma floridae (Florida lancelet)	Bfl_VNyyK	513.45 Mbp	29,857	2020 draft	BUSCO: 96.0% single copy; Chromosome scale, aligned to 20 pseudochromosomes (19 somatic + mitochondrial); Scaffold N50: 25.4 Mbp; Contig N50: 50.4 Kbp; 10.3x genome coverage
Branchiostomidae	Branchiostoma lanceolatum (European lancelet)	klBraLanc5.hap2	458.27 Mbp	29,133	2024 draft	BUSCO: 98.0% single copy; Chromosome scale, aligned to 20 pseudochromosomes (19 somatic + mitochondrial); Scaffold N50: 22.6 Mbp; Contig N50: 11.2 Mbp; 87.2x genome coverage

== Tunicates ==
=== Appendicularia ===
==== Order Copelata (Larvaceans) ====
Family	Species	Assembly Name	Genome Size	Number of Predicted Genes	Reference	Assembly status

Oikopleura dioica, a larvacean (2001).

=== Acopa ===
==== Order Stolidobranchia ====
Family	Species	Assembly Name	Genome Size	Number of Predicted Genes	Reference	Assembly status

==== Thaliacea ====
===== Order Pyrosomida (Pyrosomes) =====
Family	Species	Assembly Name	Genome Size	Number of Predicted Genes	Reference	Assembly status

===== Order Salpida (Salps) =====
Family	Species	Assembly Name	Genome Size	Number of Predicted Genes	Reference	Assembly status

===== Order Doliolida =====
Family	Species	Assembly Name	Genome Size	Number of Predicted Genes	Reference	Assembly status

==== Enterogona ====
===== Order Phlebobranchia =====
- Ciona intestinalis, a tunicate (2002)
- Ciona savignyi, a tunicate (2007)

Family	Species	Assembly Name	Genome Size	Number of Predicted Genes	Reference	Assembly status

===== Order Aplousobranchia =====
Family	Species	Assembly Name	Genome Size	Number of Predicted Genes	Reference	Assembly status

== Vertebrates ==
=== Cartilaginous fish ===
==== Holocephali ====
===== Order Chimaeriformes (Chimeras) =====
Family	Species	Assembly Name	Genome Size	Number of Predicted Genes	Reference	Assembly status
Callorhinchidae	Callorhinchus milii (Australian ghostshark)	IMCB_Cmil_1.0	0.99 Gbp	21,550	2021 draft	BUSCO: 91.4% single copy; Scaffold level assembly with 1 pseudochromosome (mitochondrial); Scaffold N50: 69.3 Mbp; Contig N50: 1.6 Mbp; 68.8x genome coverage
Chimaeridae	Hydrolagus affinis (Small-eyed rabbitfish)	UP_Haf	1.11 Gbp	N/A	2020 draft	BUSCO: Unknown; Scaffold level assembly; Scaffold N50: 19.5 Kbp; Contig N50: 15.9 Kbp; 35.0x genome coverage
Chimaeridae	Hydrolagus colliei (Spotted ratfish)	sHydCol1.hap2	1.00 Gbp	N/A	2024 draft	BUSCO: Unknown; Chromosome scale, aligned to 40 pseudochromosomes (40 somatic), no mitochondrial chromosome; Scaffold N50: 42.6 Mbp; Contig N50: 1.1 Mbp; 64.0x genome coverage

==== Selachimorpha (True Sharks) ====
- Superorder Galeomorphi
  - Order Carcharhiniformes (Ground Sharks)
    - Scyliorhinus torazame, Cloudy catshark (2018)
  - Order Lamniformes (Mackerel Sharks)
    - Carcharodon carcharias, Great white shark (2018)
  - Order Orectolobiformes (Carpet Sharks)
    - Chiloscyllium plagiosum, Whitespotted bamboo shark (2020)
    - Chiloscyllium punctatum, Brownbanded bamboo shark (2018)
    - Rhincodon typus, Whale shark (2017)

==== Batomorphi (Rays) ====
- Order Myliobatiformes
  - Potamotrygon leopoldi, Xingu river ray (2023 draft)
- Order Rajiformes
  - Leucoraja erinacea, Little skate (2023)

=== Ray-Finned Fish ===
==== Cladistia ====
- Order Polypteriformes
  - Polypterus senegalus, Senegal bichir, (2021)

==== Chondrostei ====
- Order Acipenseriformes
  - Polyodon spathula, American paddlefish, (2021 draft)

==== Holostei ====
- Order Amiiformes
  - Amia calva, Bowfin, (2021 draft)
- Order Lepisosteiformes
  - Atractosteus spatula, Alligator gar, (2024)
  - Lepisosteus oculatus, Spotted gar

==== Teleostei ====
- Order Anabantiformes
  - Betta splendens, Siamese fighting fish (2018)
  - Helostoma temminkii, Kissing gourami (2020)
- Order Anguilliformes
  - Anguilla anguilla, European Eel (2012)
  - Anguilla japonica, Japanese Eel (2022)
- Order Atheriniformes
  - Atherinopsis californiensis, Jack silverside (2023)
- Order Beloniformes
  - Oryzias latipes, medaka (2007)
- Order Callionymiformes
  - Callionymus lyra, common dragonet (2020)
- Order Carangiformes
  - Caranx ignobilis, Giant trevally (2022)
  - Caranx melampygus, Bluefin trevally (2021)
  - Pseudocaranx georgianus, New Zealand trevally (2021)
- Order Centrarchiformes
  - Oplegnathus fasciatus, barred knifejaw (2019)
  - Siniperca roulei (Slender Mandarinfish) (2025)
- Order Characiformes
  - Astyanax jordani, Mexican cavefish (2014)
  - Astyanax mexicanus, Mexican tetra (2021)
  - Colossoma macropomum, Tambaqui (2021)
  - Hasemania nana, Silvertip tetra (2013)
  - Hyphessobrycon heterorhabdus, Flag tetra (2023)
  - Petitella bleheri, Firehead tetra (2015)
  - Psalidodon paranae, (2016)
- Order Cichliformes
  - Oreochromis niloticus, Nile tilapia (2019)
  - Maylandia zebra, Lake Malawi cichlid (2019)
- Order Clupeiformes
  - Clupea harengus, Atlantic herring (2020)
  - Coilia nasus, Japanese grenadier anchovy (2020)
  - Sardina pilchardus, European pilchard (2019)
- Order Cypriniformes
  - Anabarilius grahami, Kanglang fish (2018)
  - Danio rerio, zebrafish (2007)
  - Leuciscus baicalensis, Siberian dace (2014)
  - Megalobrama amblycephala, Wuchang bream (2017)
  - Metzia formosae, (2015)
  - Opsarius caudiocellatus, (2022)
  - Oxygymnocypris stewartii, (2019)
  - Pseudobrama simoni (2020)
  - Rhodeus ocellatus, Rosy bitterling (2020)
  - Triplophysa bleekeri, Tibetan stone loach (2020)
- Order Cyprinodontiformes
  - Fundulus catenatus, Northern studfish (2020)
  - Fundulus olivaceus, Blackspotted topminnow (2020)
  - Fundulus nottii, Bayou topminnow (2020)
  - Fundulus xenicus, Diamond killifish (2020)
  - Gambusia affinis, western mosquitofish (2020)
  - Heterandria formosa, least killifish (2019)
  - Micropoecilia picta, swamp guppy (2021)
  - Xiphophorus maculatus, platyfish (2013)
  - Nothobranchius furzeri, turquoise killifish (2015)
- Order Esociformes
  - Esox lucius, northern pike (2014)
- Order Gadiformes
  - Gadus macrocephalus, Pacific cod (2022)
  - Gadus morhua, Atlantic cod (2011)
- Order Gasterosteiformes
  - Gasterosteus aculeatus, three-spined stickleback (2006, 2012)
- Order Gobiiformes
  - Oxyeleotris marmorata, marble goby (2020)
  - Periophthalmus modestus, shuttles hoppfish or shuttles mudskipper (2022)
- Order Gymnotiformes
  - Electrophorus electricus, electric eel (2014)
- Order Lampriformes
  - Lampris incognitus, Smalleye Pacific Opah (2021)
- Order Osmeriformes
  - Neosalanx tangkahkeii, Chinese icefish (2015)
  - Protosalanx hyalocranius, clearhead icefish (2017)
- Order Osteoglossiformes
  - Heterotis niloticus, African arowana (2020)
  - Paramormyrops kingsleyae, mormyrid electric fish (2017)
  - Scleropages formosus, Asian arowana (2016)
- Order Perciformes
  - Centropyge bicolor, bicolor angelfish (2021)
  - Chaetodon trifasciatus, melon butterflyfish (2020)
  - Channa argus, northern snakehead (2017)
  - Channa maculata, blotched snakehead (2021)
  - Chelmon rostratus, copperband butterflyfish (2020)
  - Chrysiptera cyanea, Sapphite damselfish (2024)
  - Dissostichus mawsoni, Antarctic toothfish (2019)
  - Eleginops maclovinus, Patagonian robalo (2019)
  - Epinephelus moara, kelp grouper (2021)
  - Larimichthys crocea, large yellow croaker (2014)
  - Lutjanus campechanus, Northern red snapper (2020)
  - Naso vlamingii, bignose unicornfish (2020)
  - Parachaenichthys charcoti, Antarctic dragonfish (2017)
  - Rachycentron canadum, Cobia (2024)
  - Seriola dumerili, Greater amberjack (2017)
  - Sillago sinica, chinese sillago (2018)
  - Siniperca knerii, Big-Eye Mandarin Fish (2020)
  - Sparus aurata, gilt-head bream (2018)
  - Holacanthus passer, King Angelfish (2024)
  - Oplegnathus fasciatus, Barred knifejaw (2024)
- Order Pleuronectiformes
  - Microstomus kitt, Lemon sole (2025)
- Order Salmoniformes
  - Salmo salar, Atlantic salmon (2016)
  - Oncorhynchus mykiss, rainbow trout (2014)
  - Oncorhynchus tshawytscha, Chinook salmon (2018)
  - Salvelinus namaycush, Lake Trout (2021)
- Order Scorpaeniformes
  - Sebastes schlegelii, Black rockfish (2018)
- Order Siluriformes
  - Clarias batrachus, walking catfish (2018)
  - Ictalurus punctatus, channel catfish (2016)
  - Pangasianodon hypophthalmus, Iridescent shark catfish (2021)
  - Silurus glanis, Wels catfish (2020)
- Order Spariformes
  - Datnioides pulcher, Siamese tigerfish (2020)
  - Datnioides undecimradiatus, Mekong tiger perch (2020)
- Order Syngnathiformes
  - Syngnathus scovelli, Gulf pipefish (2016, 2023)
  - Entelurus aequoreus, Snake pipefish (2024)
- Order Tetraodontiformes
  - Diodon holocanthus, Long-spine porcupinefish (2020)
  - Mola mola, ocean sunfish (2016)
  - Takifugu rubripes, a puffer fish (2002)
  - Tetraodon nigroviridis, a puffer fish (2004)

=== Lobe-Finned Fish (Excluding Tetrapods) ===
==== Coelacanths (Actinistia) ====
===== Order Coelacanthiformes =====
Family	Species	Assembly Name	Genome Size	Number of Predicted Genes	Reference	Assembly status
Latimeriidae	Latimeria chalumnae (West Indian Ocean coelacanth)	fLatCha1.pri	2.95 Gbp	28,938	2024 draft	BUSCO: 97.4% single copy; Chromosome scale, aligned to 30 pseudochromosomes (30 somatic), no mitochondrial chromosome; Scaffold N50: 188.1 Mbp; Contig N50: 42.1 Mbp; 41.9x genome coverage

==== Lungfish (Dipnoi) ====
===== Order Ceratodontiformes =====
Family	Species	Assembly Name	Genome Size	Number of Predicted Genes	Reference	Assembly status
Lepidosirenidae	Lepidosiren paradoxa (South American lungfish)	N/A	87.22 Gbp		2024 draft	BUSCO: Chromosome scale, aligned to 50 pseudochromosomes (49 somatic + mitochondrial), there's technically only 20 pseudochromosomes as 1, 2, 3, 4, 5, 6, 7, 8, 9, 10, 11, 12, 13, 14, 15, 16, 17, 18, and 19 were split; Scaffold N50: 2.0 Gbp; Contig N50: 11.6 Mbp; 23.0x genome coverage
Protopteridae	Protopterus annectens (West-African lungfish)	N/A	40.52 Gbp		2024 draft	BUSCO: Chromosome scale, aligned to 28 pseudochromosomes (27 somatic + mitochondrial), there are technically only 18 pseudochromosomes as 1, 2, 3, 4, 5, 6, 7, and 8 were split; Scaffold N50: 2.0 Gbp; Contig N50: 3.4 Mbp; 42.0x genome coverage
Neoceratodontidae	Neoceratodus forsteri (Australian lungfish)	neoFor_v3.1	34.56 Gbp		2023 draft	BUSCO: Chromosome scale, aligned to 21 pseudochromosomes (21 somatic), there are technically only 14 pseudochromosomes as 1,2,3 and 4 were split, no mitochondrial chromosome; Scaffold N50: 1.5 Mbp; Contig N50: 1.4 Mbp; 30.0x genome coverage

=== Amphibians ===
==== Frogs (Anura) ====
- Taudactylus pleione, Kroombit tinker frog (2023)
- Leptobrachium leishanense, Leishan Moustache toad (2019)
- Limnodynastes dumerilii dumerilii, Eastern banjo frog (2020)
- Nanorana parkeri, High Himalaya frog (2015)
- Oophaga pumilio, Strawberry poison-dart frog (2018)
- Platyplectrum ornatum, Ornate burrowing frog (2021)
- Pyxicephalus adspersus, African bullfrog (2018)
- Rana [Lithobates] catesbeiana, North American bullfrog (2017)
- Rana kukunoris, Plateau brown frog (2023)
- Rhinella marina, Cane toad (2018)
- Vibrissaphora ailaonica, Moustache toad (2019)
- Xenopus tropicalis, western clawed frog (2010)
- Mixophyes australis, Australian southern stuttering frog (2024)
- Spea multiplicata, spadefoot toad (2019)
- Pelobates cultripes, Western spadefoot toad (2022)
- Dendrobates tinctorius, Dyeing poison frog (2024)
- Ranitomeya imitator, mimic poison frog (2024)
- Phyllobates terribilis, Dart-poison frog (2025)
- Staurois parvus, foot-flagging frog (2023)

==== Salamanders (Urodela) ====
- Clade Salamandroidea
  - Family Salamandridae
    - Pleurodeles waltl, Iberian ribbed newt, (2025)
    - Triturus cristatus, great crested newt (2025)
  - Family Ambystomatidae (Mole Salamanders)
    - Ambystoma mexicanum, Axolotl (2018)

==== Caecillians ====
- Family Dermophiidae
  - Geotrypetes seraphini, Gaboon caecillian, (2023)
- Family Siphonopidae
  - Microcaecilia unicolor, a caecillian, (2023)

=== Birds ===
==== Ratites (Palaeognathae) ====
===== Order Struthioniformes =====
Family	Species	Assembly Name	Genome Size	Number of Predicted Genes	Reference	Assembly status
Struthionidae (Ostriches)	Struthio camelus (Common ostrich)	N/A	1.45 Gbp	23,381	2024 draft	BUSCO: 94.5% single copy; Chromosome scale, aligned to 41 pseudochromosomes (39 somatic + W and Z), no mitochondrial chromosome; Scaffold N50: 84.6 Mbp; Contig N50: 28.8 Mbp

===== Order Rheiformes (Rheas) =====
Family	Species	Assembly Name	Genome Size	Number of Predicted Genes	Reference	Assembly status
Rheidae	Rhea americana (Greater rhea)	rheAme1	1.16 Gbp	N/A	2018 draft	BUSCO: Unknown; Scaffold level assembly; Scaffold N50: 3.9 Mbp; Contig N50: 88.8 Kbp
Rheidae	Rhea pennata (Lesser rhea)	bPtePen1.pri	1.27 Gbp	19,550	2023 draft	BUSCO: 98.6% single copy; Chromosome scale, aligned to 41 pseudochromosomes (39 somatic + Z + mitochondrial), no W chromosome; Scaffold N50: 82.5 Mbp; Contig N50: 19.3 Mbp

===== † Order Dinornithiformes (Moas) =====
Family	Species	Assembly Name	Genome Size	Number of Predicted Genes	Reference	Assembly status
Emeidae (Lesser Moas)	† Anomalopteryx didiformis (Little bush moa)	anoDid_nucDNA_orig	1.19 Gbp	N/A	2019 draft	BUSCO: 85.2% single copy, 72.2% complete single copy; Scaffold level assemby; Complete mitochondrial genome; Scaffold N50: 3.4 Mbp; Contig N50: 824 bp

===== Order Tinamiformes (Tinamous) =====
Family	Subfamily	Species	Assembly Name	Genome Size	Number of Predicted Genes	Reference	Assembly status
Tinamidae	Tinaminae	Crypturellus boucardi (Slaty-breasted tinamou)	N/A	1.45 Gbp	N/A	2024 draft	BUSCO: Unknown; Scaffold level assembly; Scaffold N50: 930 bp; Contig N50: 920 bp
Tinamidae	Tinaminae	Crypturellus soui (Little tinamou)	N/A	1.04 Gbp	N/A	2023 draft	BUSCO: Unknown; Scaffold level assembly; Scaffold N50: 2.9 Mbp; Contig N50: 10.6 Kbp
Tinamidae	Tinaminae	Crypturellus tataupa (Tataupa tinamou)	N/A	1.01 Gbp	N/A	2023 draft	BUSCO: Unknown; Scaffold level assembly; Scaffold N50: 3.1 Mbp; Contig N50: 37.0 Kbp
Tinamidae	Tinaminae	Crypturellus undulatus (Undulated tinamou)	N/A	1.02 Gbp	15,484	2020 draft	BUSCO: Unknown (Somewhere in Supplementary Table 1); Scaffold level assembly; Scaffold N50: 387.8 Kbp; Contig N50: 99.5 Kbp
Tinamidae	Tinaminae	Tinamus guttatus (White-throated tinamou)	N/A	1.05 Gbp	16,984	2014 draft	BUSCO: 91.7% single copy; Scaffold level assembly; Scaffold N50: 246.3 Kbp; Contig N50: 29.8 Kbp
Tinamidae	Tinaminae	Tinamus major (Great tinamou)	N/A	1.00 Gbp	N/A	2023 draft	BUSCO: Unknown; Scaffold level assembly; Scaffold N50: 3.3 Mbp; Contig N50: 26.6 Kbp
Tinamidae	Tinaminae	Nothocercus julius (Tawny-breasted tinamou)	N/A	1.02 Gbp	14,778	2020 draft	BUSCO: Unknown (Somewhere in Supplementary Table 1); Scaffold level assembly; Scaffold N50: 4.1 Mbp; Contog N50: 37.6 Kbp
Tinamidae	Tinaminae	Nothocercus nigrocapillus (Hooded tinamou)	N/A	1.02 Gbp	14,502	2020 draft	BUSCO: Unknown (Somewhere in Supplementary Table 1); Scaffold level assembly; Scaffold N50: 2.6 Mbp; Contig N50: 31.0 Kbp
Tinamidae	Nothurinae	Nothoprocta ornata (Ornate tinamou)	N/A	0.98 Gbp	14,967	2020 draft	BUSCO: Unknown (Somewhere in Supplementary Table 1); Scaffold level assembly; Scaffold N50: 3.8 Mbp; Contig N50: 47.3 Kbp
Tinamidae	Nothurinae	Nothoprocta pentlandii (Andean tinamou)	N/A	0.98 Gbp	14,572	2020 draft	BUSCO: Unknown (Somewhere in Supplementary Table 1); Scaffold level assembly; Scaffold N50: 1.1 Mbp; Contog N50: 45.2 Kbp
Tinamidae	Nothurinae	Nothoprocta perdicaria (Chilean tinamou)	notPer1	0.97 Gbp	18,157	2023 draft	BUSCO: 98.1% single copy; Scaffold level assembly; Scaffold N50: 3.4 Mbp; Contog N50: 95.6 Kbp
Tinamidae	Nothurinae	Rhynchotus rufescens (Red-winged tinamou)	N/A	0.98 Gbp	N/A	2023 draft	BUSCO: Unknown; Scaffold level assembly; Scaffold N50: 16.1 Kbp; Contig N50: 9.9 Kbp
Tinamidae	Nothurinae	Nothura maculosa (Spotted nothura)	N/A	1.01 Gbp	N/A	2023 draft	BUSCO: Unknown; Scaffold level assembly; Scaffold N50: 2.5 Mbp; Contig N50: 10.9 Kbp
Tinamidae	Nothurinae	Eudromia elegans (Elegant crested tinamou)	eudEle1	0.96 Gbp	N/A	2018 draft	BUSCO: Unknown; Scaffold level assembly; Scaffold N50: 3.3 Mbp; Contig N50: 126.2 Kbp

===== Order Apterygiformes (Kiwis) =====
Family	Species	Assembly Name	Genome Size	Number of Predicted Genes	Reference	Assembly status
Apterygidae	Apteryx maxima (Great spotted kiwi)	aptHaa1	1.22 Gbp	N/A	2019 draft	BUSCO: Unknown; Scaffold level assembly; Scaffold N50: 1.4 Mbp; Contig N50: 120.1 Kbp
Apterygidae	Apteryx owenii (Little spotted kiwi)	aptOwe1	1.23 Gbp	N/A	2019 draft	BUSCO: Unknown; Scaffold level assembly; Scaffold N50: 1.6 Mbp; Contig N50: 138.4 Kbp
Apterygidae	Apteryx mantelli (North island brown kiwi)	bAptMan1.hap1	1.50 Gbp	21,410	2021 draft	BUSCO: 97.9% single copy; Chromosome scale, aligned to 43 pseudochromosomes (42 somatic + Z), no W or mitochondrial chromosome; Scaffold N50: 88.1 Mbp; Contig N50: 19.8 Mbp
Apterygidae	Apteryx rowi (Okarito brown kiwi)	aptRow1	1.23 Gbp	N/A	2019 draft	BUSCO: 97.8% single copy; Scaffold level assembly; Scaffold N50: 1.7 Mbp; Contig N50: 129.4 Kbp

===== Order Casuariiformes =====
Family	Species	Assembly Name	Genome Size	Number of Predicted Genes	Reference	Assembly status
Dromaiidae (Emus)	Dromaius novaehollandiae (Emu)	bDroNov1.hap1	1.47 Gbp	24,513	2024 draft	BUSCO: 94.2% single copy; Chromosome scale, aligned to 41 pseudochromosomes (39 somatic + W and Z), no mitochondrial chromosome; Scaffold N50: 77.9 Mbp; Contig N50 24.2 Mbp
Casuaridae (Cassowaries)	Casuarius casuarius (Southern cassowary)	N/A	1.20 Gbp	15,110	2020 draft	BUSCO: Unknown; Scaffold level assembly; Scaffold N50: 5.7 Mbp; Contig N50: 88.6 Kbp

==== Fowl (Galloanserae) ====
===== Order Anseriformes (Waterfowl) =====
Family	Subfamily	Species	Assembly Name	Genome Size	Number of Predicted Genes	Reference	Links	Assembly status
Anatidae	Anserinae	Anser cygnoides (Swan goose)				2024		
Anatidae	Anserinae	Anser indicus (Bar-headed goose)				2022		
Anatidae	Anserinae	Cygnus atratus (Black swan)				2023		
Anatidae	Anserinae	Cygnus olor (Mute swan)				2023		
Anatidae	Anatinae	Aix galericulata (Mandarin duck)				2022		
Anatidae	Anatinae	Anas platyrhynchos (Mallard duck)				2024		
Anatidae	Anatinae	Aythya fuligula (Tufted duck)				2021		
Anatidae	Anatinae	Cairina moschata (Muscovy duck)				2022		
Anatidae	Anatinae	Netta rufina (Red-crested pochard)				2024		

===== Order Galliformes (Landfowl) =====
Family	Subfamily	Species	Assembly Name	Genome Size	Number of Predicted Genes	Reference	Links	Assembly status
Numididae (Guineafowl)	Numidinae	Numida meleagris (Helmeted guinea fowl)				2019		
Phasianidae	Pavoninae	Alectoris magna (Przevalski's partridge)				2023		
Phasianidae	Pavoninae	Coturnix japonica (Japanese quail)				2020		
Phasianidae	Pavoninae	Gallus gallus (Chicken)				2004		
Phasianidae	Pavoninae	Pavo cristatus (Indian peafowl)				2018		
Phasianidae	Pavoninae	Pavo muticus (Green peafowl)				2022		
Phasianidae	Phasianinae	Ithaginis cruentus (Blood pheasant)				2020		
Phasianidae	Phasianinae	Lophophorus lhuysii (Chinese monal)				2019		
Phasianidae	Phasianinae	Lophura nycthemera (Silver pheasant)				2021		
Phasianidae	Phasianinae	Meleagris gallopavo domesticus (Domestic turkey)				2011		
Phasianidae	Phasianinae	Phasianus colchicus (Common Pheasant)				2019		
Phasianidae	Phasianinae	Syrmaticus mikado (Mikado pheasant)				2018		
Phasianidae	Phasianinae	Tetrao tetrix (Black grouse)				2014		
Phasianidae	Phasianinae	Tragopan temminckii (Temminck's tragopan)				2023		
Phasianidae	Rollulinae	Arborophila rufipectus (Sichuan Partridge)				2019		

==== Neoaves ====
===== Mirandornithes =====
====== Order Phoenicopteriformes (Flamingos) ======
Family	Species	Assembly Name	Genome Size	Number of Predicted Genes	Reference	Links	Assembly status
Phoenicopteridae	Phoenicopterus ruber ruber (American Flamingo)	N/A	1.27 Gbp	N/A	N/A, draft	NCBI Database	

====== Order Podicipediformes (Grebes) ======
Family	Species	Assembly Name	Genome Size	Number of Predicted Genes	Reference	Links	Assembly status
Podicipedidae	Podiceps auritus (Horned grebe)	N/A	1.40 Gbp	N/A	N/A, draft	NCBI Database	
	Podiceps cristatus (Great crested grebe)	N/A	1.13 Gbp	13,553	2014 draft	NCBI Database	
	Podiceps grisegena (Red-necked grebe)	N/A	1.23 Gbp	N/A	N/A, draft	NCBI Database	
	Podilymbus podiceps (Pied-billed grebe)	N/A	1.20 Gbp	15,688	2020 draft	NCBI Database	

===== Columbaves =====
====== Order Columbiformes ======
Family	Subfamily	Species	Assembly Name	Genome Size	Number of Predicted Genes	Reference	Assembly status
		Columba livia (Common Pigeon)				2014 draft	

====== Order Mesitornithiformes (Mesites) ======
Family	Subfamily	Species	Assembly Name	Genome Size	Number of Predicted Genes	Reference	Assembly status
		Mesitornis unicolor (Brown mesite)				2014 draft	

====== Order Pterocliformes (Sandgrouse) ======
Family	Subfamily	Species	Assembly Name	Genome Size	Number of Predicted Genes	Reference	Assembly status
		Pterocles gutturalis (Yellow-throated sang grouse)				2014 draft	

====== Order Musophagiformes (Turacos) ======
Family	Subfamily	Species	Assembly Name	Genome Size	Number of Predicted Genes	Reference	Assembly status
		Tauraco erythrolophus (Red-crested turaco)				2014 draft	

====== Order Otidiformes (Bustards) ======
Family	Subfamily	Species	Assembly Name	Genome Size	Number of Predicted Genes	Reference	Assembly status
		Otis tarda (Great bustard)				2023	

====== Order Cuculiformes (Cuckoos) ======
Family	Subfamily	Species	Assembly Name	Genome Size	Number of Predicted Genes	Reference	Assembly status
		Cuculus canorus (Common Cuckoo)				2014 draft	

===== Gruae =====
====== Order Opisthocomiformes ======
Family	Subfamily	Species	Assembly Name	Genome Size	Number of Predicted Genes	Reference	Assembly status
Opisthocomidae		Opisthocomus hoazin (Hoatzin)				2014	

====== Order Gruiformes ======
Family	Subfamily	Species	Assembly Name	Genome Size	Number of Predicted Genes	Reference	Assembly status
		Balearica regulorum gibbericeps (Grey-crowned crane)				2014	
		Chlamydotis macqueenii (Asian houbara)				2014	

====== Order Charadriiformes ======
Family	Subfamily	Species	Assembly Name	Genome Size	Number of Predicted Genes	Reference	Assembly status
		Charadrius vociferus (Killdeer)				2019	
		Himantopus novaezelandiae (Kakī / Black stilt)				2019	
		Himantopus himantopus (Pied stilt)				2019	
		Recurvirostra avosetta (Pied avocet)				2019	

===== Strisores =====
====== Order Caprimulgiformes (Nightjars) ======
Family	Subfamily	Species	Assembly Name	Genome Size	Number of Predicted Genes	Reference	Assembly status
		Antrostomus carolinensis (Chuck-will's widow)				2014	

====== Order Apodiformes ======
Family	Subfamily	Species	Assembly Name	Genome Size	Number of Predicted Genes	Reference	Assembly status
		Chaetura pelagica (Chimney swift)				2014	
		Calypte anna (Anna's hummingbird)				2014	

===== Phaethoquornithes =====
Order Phaethontiformes

Family	Subfamily	Species	Assembly Name	Genome Size	Number of Predicted Genes	Reference	Assembly status
		Phaethon lepturus (White-tailed tropicbird)				2014	

====== Order Eurypygiformes ======
Family	Species	Assembly Name	Genome Size	Number of Predicted Genes	Reference	Links	Assembly status
Rhynochetidae	Rhynochetos jubatus (Kagu)	bRhyJub1.pri	1.33 Gbp	N/A	2021 draft	NCBI Database	

====== Order Gaviiformes (Loons) ======
Family	Species	Assembly Name	Genome Size	Number of Predicted Genes	Reference	Links	Assembly status
Gaviidae	Gavia stellata (Red-throated loon)	bGavSte3.hap2	1.32 Gbp	17,980	2021 draft	NCBI Database	

====== Order Procellariiformes (Petrels) ======
Family	Species	Assembly Name	Genome Size	Number of Predicted Genes	Reference	Links	Assembly status
Diomedeidae (Albatrosses)	Diomedea exulans (Snowy albatross)	Dexulans_v1	1.21 Gbp	18,000+	2023 draft	NCBI Database	
Diomedeidae (Albatrosses)	Phoebastria albatrus (Short-tailed albatross)	Palbatrus_v1	1.21 Gbp	18,000+	2023 draft	NCBI Database	
Diomedeidae (Albatrosses)	Phoebastria immutabilis (Laysan albatross)	Pimmutabilis_v1	1.21 Gbp	18,000+	2023 draft	NCBI Database	
Diomedeidae (Albatrosses)	Phoebastria irrorata (Waved albatross)	Pirrorata_v1	1.21 Gbp	18,000+	2023 draft	NCBI Database	
Diomedeidae (Albatrosses)	Phoebastria nigripes (Black-footed albatross)	N/A	1.21 Gbp	18,000+	2023 draft	NCBI Database	
Diomedeidae (Albatrosses)	Thalassarche chlororhynchos (Atlantic yellow-nosed albatross)	N/A	1.09 Gbp	13,136	2020 draft	NCBI Database	
Oceanitidae (Southern Storm Petrels)	Fregetta grallaria (White-bellied storm petrel)	N/A	1.17 Gbp	15,459	2020 draft	NCBI Database	
Oceanitidae (Southern Storm Petrels)	Oceanites oceanicus (Wilson's storm petrel)	N/A	1.18 Gbp	15,848	2020 draft	NCBI Database	
Hydrobatidae (Northern Storm Petrels)	Oceanodroma leucorhoa (Leach's storm petrel)	OLeu_1.0	1.20 Gbp	N/A	2021 draft	NCBI Database	
Hydrobatidae (Northern Storm Petrels)	Oceanodroma tethys (Wedge-rumped storm petrel)	N/A	1.19 Gbp	15,643	2020 draft	NCBI Database	
Procellariidae	Ardenna gravis (Great shearwater)	N/A	1.29 Gbp	N/A	N/A, draft	NCBI Database	
Procellariidae	Calonectris borealis (Cory's shearwater)	bCalBor7.hap2.2	1.21 Gbp	N/A	N/A, draft	NCBI Database	
Procellariidae	Fulmarus glacialis (Northern fulmar)	N/A	1.14 Gbp	15,409	2014 draft	NCBI Database	
Procellariidae	Pelecanoides urinatrix (Common diving petrel)	N/A	1.21 Gbp	16,294	2020 draft	NCBI Database	
Procellariidae	Puffinus mauretanicus (Balearic shearwater)	N/A	1.22 Gbp	21,959	2022 draft	NCBI Database	
Procellariidae	Puffinus yelkouan (Yelkouan shearwater)	N/A	1.26 Gbp	N/A	N/A, draft	NCBI Database	

====== Order Sphenisciformes (Penguins) ======
Family	Genus	Species	Assembly Name	Genome Size	Number of Predicted Genes	Reference	Assembly status
Spheniscidae	Aptenodytes (Great Penguins)	Aptenodytes forsteri, Emperor penguin					
Spheniscidae	Aptenodytes (Great Penguins)	Aptenodytes patagonicus, King penguin					
Spheniscidae	Eudyptes (Crested Penguins)	Eudyptes chrysocome, Western rockhopper penguin					
Spheniscidae	Eudyptes (Crested Penguins)	Eudyptes chrysolophus chrysolophus, Macaroni penguin					
Spheniscidae	Eudyptes (Crested Penguins)	Eudyptes chrysolophus schlegeli, Royal penguin					
Spheniscidae	Eudyptes (Crested Penguins)	Eudyptes filholi, Eastern rockhopper penguin					
Spheniscidae	Eudyptes (Crested Penguins)	Eudyptes moseleyi, Northern rockhopper penguin					
Spheniscidae	Eudyptes (Crested Penguins)	Eudyptes pachyrhynchus, Fiordland penguin					
Spheniscidae	Eudyptes (Crested Penguins)	Eudyptes robustus, Snares penguin					
Spheniscidae	Eudyptes (Crested Penguins)	Eudyptes sclateri, Erect-crested penguin					
Spheniscidae	Eudyptula (Little Penguins)	Eudyptula minor albosignata, White-flippered penguin					
Spheniscidae	Eudyptula (Little Penguins)	Eudyptula minor minor, Little blue penguin					
Spheniscidae	Eudyptula (Little Penguins)	Eudyptula novaehollandiae, Fairy penguin					
Spheniscidae	Megadyptes (Hoiho Penguins)	Megadyptes antipodes antipodes, Yellow-eyed penguin					
Spheniscidae	Pygoscelis (Brush-tailed Penguins)	Pygoscelis adeliae, Adélie penguin					
Spheniscidae	Pygoscelis (Brush-tailed Penguins)	Pygoscelis antarctica, Chinstrap penguin					
Spheniscidae	Pygoscelis (Brush-tailed Penguins)	Pygoscelis papua, Gentoo penguin					
Spheniscidae	Spheniscus (Banded Penguins)	Spheniscus demersus, African penguin					
Spheniscidae	Spheniscus (Banded Penguins)	Spheniscus humboldti, Humboldt penguin					
Spheniscidae	Spheniscus (Banded Penguins)	Spheniscus magellanicus, Magellanic penguin					
Spheniscidae	Spheniscus (Banded Penguins)	Spheniscus mendiculus, Galápagos penguin					

- Genus Aptenodytes (Great Penguins)
  - Aptenodytes forsteri, Emperor penguin (2014)
  - Aptenodytes patagonicus, King penguin (2019)
- Genus Eudyptes (Crested Penguins)
  - Eudyptes chrysocome, Western rockhopper penguin (2019)
  - Eudyptes chrysolophus chrysolophus, Macaroni penguin (2019)
  - Eudyptes chrysolophus schlegeli, Royal penguin (2019)
  - Eudyptes filholi, Eastern rockhopper penguin (2019)
  - Eudyptes moseleyi, Northern rockhopper penguin (2019)
  - Eudyptes pachyrhynchus, Fiordland penguin (2019)
  - Eudyptes robustus, Snares penguin (2019)
  - Eudyptes sclateri, Erect-crested penguin (2019)
- Genus Eudyptula (Little Penguins)
  - Eudyptula minor albosignata, White-flippered penguin (2019)
  - Eudyptula minor minor, Little blue penguin (2019)
  - Eudyptula novaehollandiae, Fairy penguin (2019)
- Genus Megadyptes (Hoiho Penguins)
  - Megadyptes antipodes antipodes, Yellow-eyed penguin (2019)
- Pygoscelis (Brush-tailed Penguins)
  - Pygoscelis adeliae, Adélie penguin (2014)
  - Pygoscelis antarctica, Chinstrap penguin (2019)
  - Pygoscelis papua, Gentoo penguin (2019)
- Genus Spheniscus (Banded Penguins)
  - Spheniscus demersus, African penguin (2019)
  - Spheniscus humboldti, Humboldt penguin (2019)
  - Spheniscus magellanicus, Magellanic penguin (2019)
  - Spheniscus mendiculus, Galápagos penguin (2019)

====== Order Ciconiiformes (Storks) ======
Family	Subfamily	Species	Assembly Name	Genome Size	Number of Predicted Genes	Reference	Assembly status
Ciconiidae		Mycteria americana (Wood stork)				2024	
Ciconiidae		Ciconia boyciana (Oriental stork)				2024	

====== Order Suliformes ======
Family	Subfamily	Species	Assembly Name	Genome Size	Number of Predicted Genes	Reference	Assembly status
Phalacrocoracida (Cormorants)		Phalacrocorax carbo (Great cormorant)				2017	
Phalacrocoracida (Cormorants)		Urile pelagicus (Pelagic cormorant)				2017	
Phalacrocoracida (Cormorants)		Nannopterum auritum (Double-crested cormorant)				2017	
Phalacrocoracida (Cormorants)		Nannopterum brasilianum (Neotropical cormorant)				2014	
Phalacrocoracida (Cormorants)		Nannopterum harrisi (Galapagos flightless cormorant)				2017	

====== Order Pelecaniformes ======
Family	Subfamily	Species	Assembly Name	Genome Size	Number of Predicted Genes	Reference	Assembly status
Ardeidae (Herons)		Egretta garzetta (Little egret)				2014	
Ardeidae (Herons)		Gorsachius magnificus (White-eared Night-Heron)				2024	
Pelecanidae		Pelecanus crispus (Dalmatian Pelican)				2014	
Threskiornithidae		Nipponia nippon (Crested ibis)				2014	
Threskiornithidae		Platalea minor (Black-faced spoonbill)				2024	

===== Afroaves =====
====== Order Strigiformes (Owls) ======
Family	Subfamily	Species	Assembly Name	Genome Size	Number of Predicted Genes	Reference	Assembly status
Strigidae	Striginae	Strix occidentalis caurina (Northern spotted owl)				2014	
Strigidae	Striginae	Strix varia (Barred owl)				2017	
Tytonidae		Tyto alba (Western barn owl)				2017	

====== Order Accipitriformes ======
Add 87 hawk genomes found here: The Complete Genome Sequences of 87 Species of Hawks (Accipitriformes, Aves)

Family	Subfamily	Species	Assembly Name	Genome Size	Number of Predicted Genes	Reference	Links	Assembly status
Accipitridae	Aquilinae	Aquila chrysaetos (Golden eagle)				2018		
Accipitridae	Aegypiinae	Aegypius monachus (Cinereous vulture)				2015		
Accipitridae	Buteoninae	Haliaeetus albicilla (White-tailed eagle)				2014		
Accipitridae	Buteoninae	Haliaeetus leucocephalus (Bald eagle)				2014		
Cathartidae (New World Vultures / Condors)		Cathartes aura (Turkey vulture)	N/A	1.15 Gbp	13,116	2014	NCBI Database	
Cathartidae (New World Vultures / Condors)		Gymnogyps californianus (California condor)	N/A	1.24 Gbp	17,498	N/A, draft	NCBI Database	
Cathartidae (New World Vultures / Condors)		Sarcoramphus papa (King vulture)	bSarPap1.hap1	1.54 Gbp	N/A	2021 draft	NCBI Database	
Cathartidae (New World Vultures / Condors)		Vultur gryphus (Andean condor)	N/A	1.19 Gbp	N/A	N/A, draft	NCBI Database	

====== Order Coliiformes (Mousebirds) ======
Family	Subfamily	Species	Assembly Name	Genome Size	Number of Predicted Genes	Reference	Assembly status
		Colius striatus (Speckled mousebird)				2014	

====== Order Leptosomiformes ======
Family	Subfamily	Species	Assembly Name	Genome Size	Number of Predicted Genes	Reference	Assembly status
		Leptosomus discolor (Cuckoo-roller)				2014	

====== Order Trogoniformes (Trogons) ======
Family	Subfamily	Species	Assembly Name	Genome Size	Number of Predicted Genes	Reference	Assembly status
		Apaloderma vittatum (Bar-tailed trogon)				2014	

====== Order Bucerotiformes ======
Family	Subfamily	Species	Assembly Name	Genome Size	Number of Predicted Genes	Reference	Assembly status
		Buceros rhinoceros silvestris (Rhinoceros hornbill)				2014	

====== Order Coraciiformes ======
Family	Subfamily	Species	Assembly Name	Genome Size	Number of Predicted Genes	Reference	Assembly status
		Merops nubicus (Northern carmine bee-eater)				2014	

====== Order Piciformes ======
Family	Subfamily	Species	Assembly Name	Genome Size	Number of Predicted Genes	Reference	Assembly status
		Picoides pubescens (Downy woodpecker)				2014	

===== Australaves =====
====== Order Cariamiformes ======
Family	Species	Assembly Name	Genome Size	Number of Predicted Genes	Reference	Assembly status
Cariamidae (seriemas)	Cariama cristata (Red-legged seriema)	bCarCri1.pri	1.22 Gbp	N/A	2019 draft	BUSCO: Unknown; Chromosome scale, aligned to 52 pseudochromosomes (50 somatic + W and Z); Scaffold N50: 30.2 Mbp; Contig N50: 13.5 Mbp
Cariamidae (seriemas)	Chunga burmeisteri (Black-legged seriema)	N/A	1.17 Gbp	15,895	2020 draft	BUSCO: Unknown (Somewhere in Supplementary Table 1); Scaffold level assembly; Scaffold N50: 1.4 Mbp; Contig N50: 72.5 Kbp

====== Order Falconiformes (Falcons) ======
Family	Subfamily	Species	Assembly Name	Genome Size	Number of Predicted Genes	Reference	Assembly status
		Falco cherrug (Saker falcon)				2013	
		Falco peregrinus (Peregrine falcon)				2013	

====== Order Psittaciformes (Parrots) ======
Family	Subfamily	Species	Assembly Name	Genome Size	Number of Predicted Genes	Reference	Assembly status
Strigopidae (New Zealand Parrots)		Nestor notabilis (Kea)				2014	
Strigopidae (New Zealand Parrots)		Strigops habroptila (Kākāpō)				2023	
Psittacidae (African and New World Parrots)	Arinae	Amazona leucocephala (Cuban amazon)				2019	
Psittacidae (African and New World Parrots)	Arinae	Amazona ventralis (Hispaniolan amazon)				2019	
Psittacidae (African and New World Parrots)	Arinae	Amazona vittata (Puerto Rican amazon)				2012	
Psittacidae (African and New World Parrots)	Arinae	Ara macao (Scarlet macaw)				2013	
Psittaculidae (Old World Parrots)	Platycercinae	Cyanoramphus malherbi (Orange-fronted kākāriki)				2020	
Psittaculidae (Old World Parrots)	Loriinae	Melopsittacus undulatus (Budgerigar)				2014	

====== Order Passeriformes (Passerines) ======
Suborder	Family	Subfamily	Species	Assembly Name	Genome Size	Number of Predicted Genes	Reference	Assembly status
Acanthisitti	Acanthisittidae (New Zealand Wrens)		Acanthisitta chloris (Rifleman)				2014	
Tyranni	Philepittidae (Asities)							
Tyranni	Eurylaimidae (Eurylaimid broadbills)							
Tyranni	Calyptomenidae (Asian green broadbills)							
Tyranni	Sapayoidae							
Tyranni	Pittidae (Pittas)							
Tyranni	Pipridae (Manakins)							
Tyranni	Cotingidae (Cotingas)							
Tyranni	Tityridae							
Tyranni	Tyrannidae (Tyrant flycatchers)							
Tyranni	Melanopareiidae (Crescentchests)							
Tyranni	Conopophagidae (Gnateaters)							
Tyranni	Thamnophilidae (Antbirds)							
Tyranni	Grallariidae (Antpittas)							
Tyranni	Rhinocryptidae (Tapaculos)							
Tyranni	Formicariidae (Antthrushes)							
Tyranni	Furnariidae (Ovenbirds)							
Passeri (Songbirds)	Unsorted (to someone who cares about these, please fix this)		Corvus brachyrhynchos, American crow				2014	
Passeri (Songbirds)	Unsorted (to someone who cares about these, please fix this)		Corvus hawaiiensis, Hawaiian crow				2018	
Passeri (Songbirds)	Unsorted (to someone who cares about these, please fix this)		Eopsaltria australis, Eastern yellow robin				2019	
Passeri (Songbirds)	Unsorted (to someone who cares about these, please fix this)		Ficedula albicollis, collared flycatcher				2012	
Passeri (Songbirds)	Unsorted (to someone who cares about these, please fix this)		Ficedula hypoleuca, pied flycatcher				2012	
Passeri (Songbirds)	Unsorted (to someone who cares about these, please fix this)		Geospiza fortis, medium ground-finch				2014	
Passeri (Songbirds)	Unsorted (to someone who cares about these, please fix this)		Hirundo rustica, barn swallow				2018	
Passeri (Songbirds)	Unsorted (to someone who cares about these, please fix this)		Lonchura striata domestica, Society finch				2018	
Passeri (Songbirds)	Unsorted (to someone who cares about these, please fix this)		Manacus vitellinus, golden-collared manakin				2014	
Passeri (Songbirds)	Unsorted (to someone who cares about these, please fix this)		Lycocorax pyrrhopterus, Paradise-crow				2019	
Passeri (Songbirds)	Unsorted (to someone who cares about these, please fix this)		Malurus cyaneus, superb fairywren				2021	
Passeri (Songbirds)	Unsorted (to someone who cares about these, please fix this)		Manacus vitellinus, golden-collared manakin				2014	
Passeri (Songbirds)	Unsorted (to someone who cares about these, please fix this)		Notiomystis cincta, stichbird or hihi				2019	
Passeri (Songbirds)	Unsorted (to someone who cares about these, please fix this)		Paradisaea rubra, red bird-of-paradise				2019	
Passeri (Songbirds)	Unsorted (to someone who cares about these, please fix this)		Pteridophora alberti, king of Saxony bird-of-paradise				2019	
Passeri (Songbirds)	Unsorted (to someone who cares about these, please fix this)		Ptiloris paradiseus, paradise riflebird				2019	
Passeri (Songbirds)	Unsorted (to someone who cares about these, please fix this)		Taeniopygia guttata, zebra finch				2010	
Oscines	Fringilidae		Oreomystis bairdi ('Akiki)				2025	
	Fringilidae		Loxops caeruleirostris ('Akeke'e)				2025	
	Fringilidae		Melamprosops phaeosoma (Po'ouli)				2025	

=== Crocodilians ===
Family	Subfamily	Species	Assembly Name	Genome Size	Number of Predicted Genes	Reference	Links	Assembly status
Alligatoridae	Alligatorinae (Alligators)	Alligator mississippiensis (American alligator)	AllMis2	2.16 Gbp	18,955	2017 draft	NCBI Database	
Alligatoridae	Alligatorinae (Alligators)	Alligator sinensis (Chinese alligator)	N/A	2.27 Gbp	22,200	2013 draft	NCBI Database	
Crocodilidae (Crocodiles)	Crocodylinae	Crocodylus porosus (Saltwater crocodile)	Cpor_3.0	2.12 Gbp	23,128	2019 draft	NCBI Database	
Crocodilidae (Crocodiles)	Crocodylinae	Crocodylus rhombifer (Cuban crocodile)	N/A	2.31 Gbp	17,737	2024 draft	NCBI Database	
Gavialidae	Gavialinae (Gharials)	Gavialis gangeticus (Indian gharial)	GavGan_comp1	2.64 Gbp	18,911	2014 draft	NCBI Database	

=== Turtles ===
==== Crytodira (Hidden-Neck Turtles) ====
===== Trionychia (Softshell Turtles) =====
Family	Subfamily	Species	Assembly Name	Genome Size	Number of Predicted Genes	Reference	Links	Assembly status
Trionychidae	Trionychinae	Apalone spinifera Spiny softshell turtle	N/A	1.90 Gbp	15,945	2024 draft	NCBI Database	
Trionychidae	Trionychinae	Pelochelys cantorii Asian giant softshell turtle	N/A	2.16 Gbp	21,833	2023 draft	NCBI Database	
Trionychidae	Trionychinae	Pelodiscus sinensis Chinese softshell turtle	PelSin_1.0	2.20 Gbp	24,856	2013 draft	NCBI Database	
Carettochelyidae	Carettochelyinae	Carettochelys insculpta Pig-nosed turtle	N/A	2.18 Gbp	19,175	2024 draft	NCBI Database	

===== Testudinoidea =====
Family	Subfamily	Species	Assembly Name	Genome Size	Number of Predicted Genes	Reference	Links	Assembly status
Emydidae (Terrapins)	Emydinae	Actinemys marmorata (Northwestern pond turtle)	N/A	2.30 Gbp	N/A	2022 draft	NCBI Database	
Emydidae (Terrapins)	Deirochelyinae	Chrysemys picta bellii (Western painted turtle)	N/A	2.37 Gbp	25,216	N/A	NCBI Database	
Emydidae (Terrapins)	Deirochelyinae	Trachemys scripta elegans (Red-eared slider)	CAS_Tse_1.0	2.13 Gbp	22,456	2020 draft	NCBI Database	
Platysternidae		Platysternon megacephalum (Big-headed turtle)	N/A	2.32 Gbp	21,529	2019 draft	NCBI Database	
Geoemydidae	Geoemydinae	Mauremys reevesii (Chinese three-keeled pond turtle)	N/A	2.37 Gbp	22,618	2021 draft	NCBI Database	
Testudinidae (Tortoises)		Aldabrachelys gigantea (Aldabra giant tortoise)	AldGig_1.0	2.37 Gbp	23,953	2022 draft	NCBI Database	
Testudinidae (Tortoises)		† Chelonoidis abingdonii (Pinta Island giant tortoise)	N/A	2.30 Gbp	25,634	2019 draft	NCBI Database	
Testudinidae (Tortoises)		Gopherus agassizii (Agassiz's desert tortoise)	N/A	2.18 Gbp	20,172	2017 draft	NCBI Database	
Testudinidae (Tortoises)		Testudo graeca (Greek tortoise)	N/A	2.32 Gbp	25,998	2024 draft	NCBI Database	

===== Chelonioidea (Sea Turtles) =====
Family	Subfamily	Species	Assembly Name	Genome Size	Number of Predicted Genes	Reference	Links	Assembly status
Cheloniidae	Carettinae	Caretta caretta (Loggerhead sea turtle)	GSC_CCare_1.0	2.13 Gbp	24,887	2023 draft	NCBI Database	
Cheloniidae	Cheloniinae	Chelonia mydas (Green sea turtle)	rCheMyd1.pri.v2	2.13 Gbp	28,491	N/A	NCBI Database	

===== Chelydroidea =====
Family	Species	Assembly Name	Genome Size	Number of Predicted Genes	Reference	Links	Assembly status
Chelydridae (Snapping Turtles)	Chelydra serpentina (Common snapping turtle)	N/A	2.26 Gbp	21,825	2020 draft	NCBI Database	
Kinosternidae	Staurotypus triporcatus (Mexican musk turtle)	N/A	1.75 Gbp	16,621	2024 draft	NCBI Database	

==== Pleurodira ====
Family	Species	Assembly Name	Genome Size	Number of Predicted Genes	Reference	Assembly status
Chelidae	Emydura macquarii macquarii (Murray river turtle)	CSIRO-AGI_Emac_v2	1.92 Gbp	27,035	2024 draft	BUSCO 97.8% single copy; Contig scale assembly; Contig N50: 17.1 Mbp

=== Rhynchocephalia ===
==== Neosphenodontia ====
Family	Subfamily	Species	Assembly Name	Genome Size	Number of Predicted Genes	Reference	Links	Assembly status
Sphenodontidae	Sphenodontinae	Sphenodon punctatus (Tuatara)	N/A	4.27 Gbp	17,448	2020 draft	NCBI Database	

=== Squamates ===
==== Gekkota (Gekkos) ====
- Clade Gekkomorpha
  - Family Eublepharidae
    - Eublepharis macularius, Leopard gecko (2016)
  - Family Gekkonidae
    - Lepidodactylus listeri, Lister's gecko (2025)
  - Family Diplodactylidae
    - Correlophus ciliatus, crested gecko (2024)

==== Scinciformata ====
- Clade Cordylomorpha
  - Family Cordylidae
    - Hemicordylus capensis, Cape cliff lizard, (2023)
- Cryptoblepharus egeriae, Christmas Island blue-tailed skink (2025)

==== Laterata ====
- Clade Teiformata
  - Family Teiidae
    - Salvator merianae, Argentine black and white tegu, (2018)
- Clade Lacertiformata
  - Family Lacertidae
    - Zootoca vivipara, Viviparous lizard (2020)

==== Toxicofera ====
===== Anguimorpha =====
- Clade Paleoanguimorpha
  - Family Shinisauridae
    - Shinisaurus crocodilurus, Chinese crocodile lizard, (2017)
- Clade Neoanguimorpha
  - Family Helodermatidae
    - Heloderma charlesbogerti, Guatemalan beaded lizard, (2022)
  - Family Anguidae
    - Dopasia gracilis, Burmese glass lizard, (2015)

===== Iguania =====
- Clade Acrodonta
  - Family Agamidae
    - Pogona vitticeps, Central bearded dragon, (2015)
- Clade Pleurodonta
  - Family Dactyloidae
    - Anolis carolinensis, Carolina anole, (2011)
  - Family Phrynosomatidae
    - Phrynosoma platyrhinos, Dessert horned lizard, (2021)
    - Phrynosoma cornutum, Texas horned lizard, (2021)
    - Sceloporus undulatus, Eastern fence lizard (2021)

===== Serpentes (Snakes) =====
- Clade Scolecophidia (Blindsnakes)
  - Family Typhlopidae
    - Anilios bituberculatus, Prong-snouted blind snake (2021)
    - Indotyphlops braminus, Brahminy blindsnake, (2022)
- Clade Booidea
  - Family Pythonidae
    - Morelia viridis, Green Tree Python (2022)
    - Python bivittatus, Burmese python (2013)
    - Python regius, Ball python (2020)
    - Simalia boeleni, Boelen's Python (2022)
  - Family Boidae
    - Boa constrictor, Boa constrictor (2019)
    - Charina bottae, Rubber boa, (2022)
- Clade Caenophidia
  - Family Viperidae
    - Azemiops feae, Fea's viper (2022)
    - Bothrops jararaca, Jararaca lancehead, (2021)
    - Crotalus adamanteus, Eastern diamondback rattlesnake (2021)
    - Crotalus mitchellii pyrrhus, southwestern speckled rattlesnake (2014)
    - Crotalus oreganus helleri, southern Pacific rattlesnake (2023)
    - Crotalus tigris, Tiger rattlesnake (2021)
    - Crotalus viridis, Great Plains rattlesnake (2018)
    - Daboia siamensis, Eastern Russell's viper (2022)
    - Deinagkistrodon acutus, Five-pacer viper (2016)
    - Protobothrops flavoviridis, Okinawa Habu (2018)
    - Protobothrops mucrosquamatus, Taiwanese Habu (2017, 2024)
    - Trimeresurus albolabris, White-lipped tree pit viper (2024)
    - Cerastes gasperetti, Arabian horned viper (2025)
  - Family Homalopsidae
    - Myanophis thanlyinesis, (No common name), (2021)
  - Family Colubridae
    - Ahaetulla prasina, Asian vine snake (2023)
    - Arizona elegans occidentalis, California glossy snake (2022)
    - Chrysopelea ornata, Ornate Flying Snake (2023)
    - Diadophis punctatus, ring-necked snake (2023)
    - Dolichophis caspius, Caspian whipsnake (2020)
    - Elaphe carinata, King ratsnake (2024)
    - Pantherophis guttatus, corn snake (2014)
    - Pantherophis obsoletus, Leucistic Texas Rat Snake (2021)
    - Ptyas mucosa, Oriental rat snake (2024)
    - Thamnophis sirtalis, Common garter snake (2018)
    - Thermophis baileyi, Tibetan hot-spring snake (2018)
  - Family Elapidae
    - Bungarus multicinctus, Many-banded krait (2022)
    - Emydocephalus ijimae, Ijima's turtle-headed sea snake, (2019)
    - Hydrophis curtus, Shaw's Sea Snake (2020)
    - Hydrophis cyanocinctus, blue-banded sea snakes (2021)
    - Hydrophis melanocephalus, slender-necked sea snake, (2019)
    - Laticauda colubrina, yellow-lipped sea krait, (2019)
    - Laticauda laticaudata, blue-lipped sea krait, (2019)
    - Naja atra, Chinese cobra (2024)
    - Naja naja, Indian cobra (2020)
    - Notechis scutatus, mainland tiger snake (2022)
    - Ophiophagus hannah, king cobra (2013)
    - Pseudonaja textilis, eastern brown snake (2022)

=== Mammals ===
==== Monotremes ====
Family	Species	Assembly Name	Genome Size	Number of Predicted Genes	Reference	Assembly status
Ornithorhynchidae (Platypuses)	Ornithorhynchus anatinus (Platypus)	mOrnAna1.pri.v4	1.86 Gbp	30,497	2020 draft	BUSCO: 91.2% single copy; Chromosome scale, aligned to 32 pseudochromosomes (21 somatic + 5 X and 5 Y + mitochondrial); Scaffold N50: 83.3 Mbp; Contig N50: 15.1 Mbp
Tachyglossidae (Echidnas)	Tachyglossus aculeatus (Short-beaked echidna)	mTacAcu1.pri	2.21 Gbp	31,147	2020 draft	BUSCO: 90.7% single copy; Chromosome scale, aligned to 36 pseudochromosomes (27 somatic + 4 X and 5 Y), no X5 or mitochondrial chromosome; Scaffold N50: 63.4 Mbp; Contig N50: 19.9 Mbp

==== Marsupials ====
- Order Didelphimorphia
  - Family Didelphidae (opossums)
    - Monodelphis domestica, gray short-tailed opossum (2007)
- Order Dasyuromorphia
  - Family Dasyuridae
    - Antechinus stuartii, brown antechinus (2020)
    - Sarcophilus harrisii, Tasmanian devil
    - Sminthopsis crassicaudata, fat-tailed dunnart (ongoing)
    - Dasyurus hallucatus, northern quoll (ongoing)
  - Family Myrmecobiidae
    - Myrmecobius fasciatus, numbat (ongoing)
  - † Family Thylacinidae
    - † Thylacinus cynocephalus, thylacine
- Order Peramelemorphia
  - Family Peramelidae
    - Perameles gunnii, eastern barred bandicoot (ongoing)
  - Family Thylacomyidae
    - Macrotis lagotis, greater bilby (ongoing)
- Order Notoryctemorphia, Family Notoryctidae
  - Notoryctes typhlops, southern marsupial mole (ongoing)
- Order Diprotodontia
  - Family Macropodidae
    - Macropus eugenii, tammar wallaby (2011)
    - Petrogale penicillata, brush-tailed rock-wallaby (ongoing)
  - Family Potoroidae
    - Bettongia gaimardi, eastern bettong (ongoing)
    - Bettongia penicillata ogilbyi, woylie (2021)
  - Family Petauridae
    - Gymnobelideus leadbeateri, Leadbeater's possum (ongoing)
  - Family Burramyidae
    - Burramys parvus, mountain pygmy possum (ongoing)
  - Family Vombatidae
    - Vombatus ursinus, common wombat (ongoing)
  - Family Phascolarctidae
    - Phascolarctos cinereus, koala (2013 draft)

==== Placentals ====
===== Afrotheria =====
====== Order Hyracoidea ======
- Family Procaviidae
  - Procavia capensis, Rock hyrax, (2011)

Family	Species	Assembly Name	Genome Size	Number of Predicted Genes	Reference	Assembly status

====== Order Proboscidea ======
- Family Elephantidae (Elephants)
  - Elephas maximus, Asian elephant, (2015, 2024)
  - † Mammuthus primigenius, Wooly mammoth, (2015)
  - Loxodonta africana, African bush elephant, (2009, 2024)
  - Loxodonta cyclotis, African forest elephant, (2018)

Family	Species	Assembly Name	Genome Size	Number of Predicted Genes	Reference	Assembly status

====== Order Sirenia (Sea Cows) ======
- Family Trichechidae
  - Trichechus manatus, West Indian manatee, (2015)
- Family Dugongidae
  - Dugong dugon, Dugong, (2024)

Family	Species	Assembly Name	Genome Size	Number of Predicted Genes	Reference	Assembly status

===== Euarchontoglires =====
- Order Lagomorpha
  - Family Leporidae
    - Oryctolagus cuniculus, European rabbit (2010)
- Order Primates
  - Family Callitrichidae
    - Callithrix jacchus, Common marmoset (2010, whole genome 2014)
  - Family Cercopithecidae
    - Macaca mulatta, rhesus macaque (2007 & Chinese rhesus macaque Macaca mulatta lasiota in 2011)
    - Macaca fascicularis, Cynomolgus or crab-eating macaque (2011)
    - Papio anubis, olive baboon (2020)
    - Papio cynocephalus, yellow baboon (2016)
    - Rhinopithecus roxellana, golden snub-nosed monkey (2019)
  - Family Galagidae
    - Otolemur garnettii, small-eared galago, or bushbaby
  - Family Hominidae
    - Subfamily Ponginae
      - Pongo pygmaeus/Pongo abelii, orangutan (Borneo/Sumatra) (2011)
    - Subfamily Homininae
      - Gorilla gorilla, western gorilla (2012)
      - Homo sapiens, modern human (draft 2001, whole genome 2022)
      - † Homo neanderthalensis, Neanderthal (draft 2010)
      - Pan troglodytes, chimpanzee (2005)
      - Pan paniscus, bonobo (2012)
- Order Rodentia
  - Family Caviidae
    - Hydrochoerus hydrochaeris, capybara (2018)
  - Family Cricetidae
    - Microtus montanus, Montane vole (2021)
    - Microtus richardsoni, North American Water Vole (2021)
    - Peromyscus leucopus, white-footed mouse (2019)
  - Family Heteromyidae
    - Perognathus longimembris pacificus, Pacific Pocket Mouse
  - Family Muridae
    - Mastomys coucha, Southern multimammate mouse (2019)
    - Mus musculus Strain: C57BL/6J, House mouse (2002)
    - Rattus norvegicus, Brown rat (2004)

===== Laurasiatheria =====
- Order Artiodactyla (even-toed ungulates)
  - Family Antilocapridae
    - Antilocapra americana, pronghorn (2019)
  - Family Balaenidae
    - Balaena mysticetus, bowhead whale (2015)
    - Eubalaena glacialis, North Atlantic right whale (2018)
  - Family Balaenopteridae
    - Balaenoptera acutorostrata, common minke whale (2014)
    - Balaenoptera borealis, sei whale (2018)
    - Balaenoptera musculus, blue whale (2018)
    - Balaenoptera physalus, fin whale (2014)
    - Megaptera novaeangliae, humpback whale (2018)
  - Family Bovidae
    - Ammotragus lervia, Barbary sheep (2019)
    - Antidorcas marsupialis, Springbox (2019)
    - Bison bonasus, European bison (2017)
    - Bos grunniens, yak 2012
    - Bos primigenius indicus, zebu or Brahman cattle (2012)
    - Bos primigenius taurus, cow 2009
    - Bubalus bubalis, river buffalo (2017)
    - Budorcas taxicolor, Takin (2023)
    - Capra ibex, Goats (2019)
    - Cephalophus harveyi, Harvey's duiker (2019)
    - Connochaetes taurinus, blue wildebeest (2019)
    - Damaliscus lunatus, common tsessebe (2019)
    - Gazella thomsoni, Thomson's gazelle (2019)
    - Hippotragus niger, Sable Antelope (2019)
    - Kobus ellipsiprymnus, Waterbuck (2019)
    - Litocranius walleri, Gerenuk (2019)
    - Oreotragus oreotragus, Klipspringer (2019)
    - Oryx gazella, Gemsbok (2019)
    - Ourebia ourebi, Oribi (2019)
    - Ovis ammon, Argali (2019)
    - Ovis ammon polii, marco polo sheep (2017)
    - Nanger granti, Grant's gazelle (2019)
    - Neotragus moschatus, Suni (2019)
    - Neotragus pygmaeus, Royal antelope (2019)
    - Philantomba maxwellii, Maxwell's duiker (2019)
    - Procapra przewalskii, Przewalski's gazelle (2019)
    - Pseudois nayaur, Bharal (2019)
    - Pseudoryx nghetinhensis, Saola (2025)
    - Raphicerus campestris, Steenbox (2019)
    - Redunca redunca, Bohor reedbuck (2019)
    - Syncerus caffer, African buffalo (2019)
    - Sylvicapra grimmia, common duiker (2019)
    - Tragelaphus, Spiral-horned bovine (2019)
    - Tragelaphus buxtoni, Mountain nyala (2019)
    - Tragelaphus strepsiceros, Greater kudu (2019)
    - Tragelaphus imberbis, Lesser kudu (2019)
    - Tragelaphus spekii, Sitatunga (2019)
    - Tragelaphus scriptus, Bushbuck (2019)
    - Taurotragus oryx, Common eland (2019)
  - Family Camelidae
    - Camelus ferus, Wild Bactrian camel (2007)
  - Family Cervidae
    - Cervus albirostris, Tharold's deer (2019)
    - Elaphurus davidianus, Père David's deer (2018)
    - Muntiacus crinifrons, hairy-fronted muntjac (2019)
    - Muntiacus muntjak, Indian muntjac (2019)
    - Muntiacus reevesi, Reeves's muntjac (2019)
    - Odocoileus hemionus, mule deer (2021)
    - Rangifer tarandus, Reindeer (2017)
    - Rusa alfredi, Visayan spotted deer (2025)
  - Family Delphinidae
    - Tursiops truncatus, bottlenosed dolphin (2012)
    - Neophocaena phocaenoides, finless porpoise (2014)
    - Orcinus orca, killer whale (2015)
    - Sousa chinensis, Indo-Pacific humpback dolphin (2019)
  - Family Eschrichtiidae
    - Eschrichtius robustus, gray whale (2018)
  - Family Giraffidae
    - Giraffa camelopardalis, Giraffe (2019)
    - Giraffa camelopardalis tippelskirchi, Masai giraffe (2019)
    - Okapia johnstoni, Okapi (2019)
  - Family Monodontidae
    - Delphinapterus, beluga whale (2017)
  - Family Moschidae
    - Moschus berezovskii, forest musk deer (2018)
    - Moschus chrysogaster, Alpine musk deer (2019)
  - Family Phocoenidae
    - Neophocaena asiaeorientalis sunameri, East Asian finless porpoise (2024)
    - Neophocaena asiaorientalis asiaorientalis, Yangtze finless porpoise (2024)
  - Family Physeteridae
    - Physeter macrocephalus, sperm whale (2019)
  - Family Suidae
    - Sus scrofa, pig (2012)
  - Family Tragulidae
    - Tragulus javanicus, Java mouse-deer (2019)
- Order Carnivora
  - Family Felidae
    - Acinonyx jubatus, cheetah (2015)
    - Felis catus, cat (2007)
    - Panthera leo, lion (2013)
    - Panthera pardus, Amur leopard (2016)
    - Panthera tigris tigris, Siberian tiger (2013)
    - Panthera tigris tigris, Bengal tiger (2013)
    - Panthera uncia, snow leopard (2013)
    - Prionailurus bengalensis, leopard cat (2016)
  - Family Canidae
    - Canis familiaris, dog (2005)
    - Canis lupus lupus, wolf (2017).
    - Lycaon pictus, african wild dog (2018)
  - Family Ursidae
    - Ailuropoda melanoleuca, giant panda (2010)
    - Ursus arctos ssp. horribilis, Grizzly bear (2018)
    - Ursus americanus, American black bear (2019)
    - Ursus maritimus, Polar bear (2014)
  - Family Odobenidae
    - Odobenus rosmarus, walrus (2015)
  - Family Phocidae
    - Pusa sibirica, Baikal seal (2024)
    - Pusa caspica, Caspian seal (2024)
    - Phoca vitulina, Harbor seal (2024)
    - Pusa hispida, Ringed seal (2024)
  - Family Mustelidae
    - Enhydra lutris kenyoni, sea otter (2017)
    - Mustela erminea, stoat (2018)
    - Mustela furo, ferret (2014)
    - Pteronura brasiliensis, giant otter (2019)
- Order Chiroptera
  - Family Megadermatidae
    - Megaderma lyra, greater false vampire bat (2013)
  - Family Mormoopidae
    - Pteronotus parnellii, Parnell's mustached bat (2013)
  - Family Pteropodidae
    - Pteropus vampyrus, fruit bat (2012)
    - Eidolon helvum, Old World fruit bat (2013)
  - Family Rhinolophidae
    - Rhinolophus ferrumequinum, greater horseshoe bat (2013)
  - Family Vespertilionidae
    - Myotis lucifugus, little brown bat (2010)
    - Myotis mystacinus, whiskered bat (2024)
  - Family Phyllostomidae
    - Leptonycteris yerbabuenae, long nosed bat (2020)
    - Leptonycteris nivalis, greater long nosed bat (2020)
    - Musonycteris harrisoni, banana bat (2020)
    - Artibeus jamaicensis, Jamaican fruit bat (2020)
    - Macrotus waterhousii, Waterhouse's leaf-nosed bat (2020
- Order Erinaceomorpha, Family Erinaceidae
  - Erinaceus europaeus, western European hedgehog
- Order Eulipotyphla, Family Solenodontidae
  - Solenodon parodoxus, Hispaniolan solenodon (2018)
- Order Perissodactyla (odd-toed ungulates)
  - Family Equidae
    - Equus caballus, horse (2009 2018)

== Arthropods ==
=== Insects ===
- Order Blattodea
  - Blattella germanica, German cockroach (2018)
  - Periplaneta americana, American cockroach (2018)
  - Zootermopsis nevadensis, a dampwood termite (2014
  - Cryptotermes secundus, a drywood termite(2018)
  - Macrotermes natalensis, a higher termite (2014
- Order Coleoptera
  - Dendroctonus ponderosae Hopkins, beetle (mountain pine beetle) (2013)
  - Aquatica lateralis, Japanese aquatic firefly "Heike-botaru" (firefly) (2018)
  - Photinus pyralis, Big Dipper firefly (2018)
  - Protaetia brevitarsis, White-spotted flower chafer (2019)
  - Tribolium castaneum Strain:GA-2, beetle (red flour beetle) (2008)
  - Allomyrina dichotoma, Japanese rhinoceros beetle (2022)
  - Pachyrhynchus sulphureomaculatus, Easter Egg Weevil (2021)
- Order Collembola
  - Family Isotomidae
    - Desoria tigrina, (2021)
  - Family Sminthurididae
    - Sminthurides aquaticus, (2021)
- Order Diptera
  - Family Calliphoridae
    - Aldrichina grahami, Forensic blowfly (2020)
  - Family Chironomidae
    - Dasypogon diadema, Hunting Robber fly (2019)
    - Parochlus steinend, Antarctic winged midge (2017)
    - Proctacanthus coquilletti, Assassin fly (2017)
  - Family Culicidae (mosquitoes)
    - Aedes aegypti Strain:LVPib12, mosquito (vector of dengue fever, etc.) (2007)
    - Aedes albopictus (2015)
    - Anopheles darlingi
    - Anopheles gambiae Strain: PEST, mosquito (vector of malaria) (2002)
    - Anopheles gambiae Strain: M, mosquito (vector of malaria) (2010)
    - Anopheles gambiae Strain: S, mosquito (vector of malaria) (2010)
    - Anopheles sinensis, mosquito (vector of vivax malaria, lymphatic filariasis and Setaria infections), (2014)
    - Anopheles stephensii
    - Anopheles arabiensis (2015)
    - Anopheles quadriannulatus (2015)
    - Anopheles merus (2015)
    - Anopheles melas (2015)
    - Anopheles christyi (2015)
    - Anopheles epiroticus (2015)
    - Anopheles maculatus (2015)
    - Anopheles culicifacies (2015)
    - Anopheles minimus (2015)
    - Anopheles funestus (2015, 2019)
    - Anopheles dirus (2015)
    - Anopheles farauti (2015)
    - Anopheles atroparvus (2015)
    - Anopheles sinensis (2015)
    - Anopheles albimanus (2015)
    - Culex quinquefasciatus, mosquito (vector of West Nile virus, filariasis etc.) (2010)
  - Family Drosophilidae (fruit flies)
    - Drosophila albomicans, fruit fly (2012)
    - Drosophila ananassae, fruit fly (2007)
    - Drosophila biarmipes, fruit fly (2011)
    - Drosophila bipectinata, fruit fly (2011)
    - Drosophila erecta, fruit fly (2007)
    - Drosophila elegans, fruit fly (2011)
    - Drosophila eugracilis, fruit fly (2011)
    - Drosophila ficusphila, fruit fly (2011)
    - Drosophila grimshawi, fruit fly (2007)
    - Drosophila kikkawai, fruit fly (2011)
    - Drosophila melanogaster, fruit fly (model organism) (2000)
    - Drosophila mojavensis, fruit fly (2007)
    - Drosophila neotestacea, fruit fly (transcriptome 2014)
    - Drosophila persimilis, fruit fly (2007)
    - Drosophila pseudoobscura, fruit fly (2005)
    - Drosophila rhopaloa, fruit fly (2011)
    - Drosophila santomea, fruit fly
    - Drosophila sechellia, fruit fly (2007)
    - Drosophila simulans, fruit fly (2007)
    - Drosophila takahashi, fruit fly (2011)
    - Drosophila virilis, fruit fly (2007)
    - Drosophila willistoni, fruit fly (2007)
    - Drosophila yakuba, fruit fly (2007)
  - Family Phoridae
    - Megaselia abdita, scuttle fly (transcriptome 2013)
  - Family Psychodidae (drain flies)
    - Clogmia albipunctata, moth midge (transcriptome 2013)
  - Family Sarcophagidae (flesh flies)
    - Sarcophaga Bullata, Flesh fly (2019)
  - Family Syrphidae (hoverflies)
    - Episyrphus balteatus, hoverfly (transcriptome 2011)
- Order Hemiptera
  - Acyrthosiphon pisum, aphid (pea aphid) (2010)
  - Ericerus pela, Chinese wax scale insect (2019)
  - Laodelphax striatellus, small brown planthopper (2017)
  - Lycorma delicatula, spotted lanternfly (2019)
  - Rhodnius prolixus, kissing-bug (2015)
  - Rhopalosiphum maidis, Corn leaf aphid (2019)
  - Sitobion miscanthi, Indian grain aphid (2019)
  - Triatoma rubrofasciata, assassin bug (2019)
- Order Hymenoptera
  - Acromyrmex echinatior colony Ae372, ant (Panamanian leafcutter) (2011)
  - Apis mellifera, bee (honey bee), (model for eusocial behavior) (2006)
  - Atta cephalotes, ant (leaf-cutter ant) (2011)
  - Camponotus floridanus, ant (2010)
  - Cerapachys biroi, ant (clonal raider ant)(2014)
  - Euglossa dilemma, Green orchid bee (2017)
  - Harpegnathos saltator, ant (2010)
  - Lasius niger, ant (black garden ant)(2017)
  - Linepithema humile, ant (Argentine ant) (2011)
  - Nasonia giraulti, wasp (parasitoid wasp) (2010)
  - Nasonia longicornis, wasp (parasitoid wasp) (2010)
  - Nasonia vitripennis, wasp (parasitoid wasp; model organism) (2010)
  - Netelia fuscicornis, wasp (parasitoid wasp) (2024)
  - Nomia Melanderi, Alkali bee (2019)
  - Pogonomyrmex barbatus, ant (red harvester ant) (2011)
  - Solenopsis invicta, ant (fire ant) (2011)
- Order Lepidoptera
  - Abrostola tripartita Hufnagel, Spectacle (2021)
  - Achalarus lyciades, Hoary Edge Skipper (2017)
  - Ahamus jianchuanensis, Jianchuan ghost moth (2024)
  - Antharaea yamamai, Japanese oak silk moth (2019)
  - Arctia plantaginis, Wood tiger moth (2020)
  - Bicyclus anynana, squinting bush brown (2017)
  - Bombyx mori Strain:p50T, moth (domestic silk worm) (2004)
  - Calycopis cecrops, Red-Banded Groundstreak (2016)
  - Calycopis isobeon, Dusky-Blue Groundstreak (2016)
  - Coenonympha arcania, Pearly Heath (2024)
  - Cydia pomonella, codling moth (2019)
  - Danaus plexippus, monarch butterfly) (2011)
  - Erebia cassioides, Common Brassy Ringlet (2025)
  - Heliconius melpomene, butterfly (2012)
  - Keiferia lycopersicella, Tomato pinworm (2024)
  - Melitaea cinxia, Glanville fritillary butterfly (2014)
  - Megathymus ursus violae, bear giant skipper butterfly (2018)
  - Morpho helenor, Common blue morpho (2023)
  - Morpho achilles, Blue-banded morpho (2023)
  - Morpho deidamia (2023)
  - Papilio bianor, Chinese peacock butterfly (2019)
  - Phthorimaea absoluta, Tomato leafminer (2024)
  - Pieris rapae, small cabbage white butterfly (2016)
  - Plodia interpunctella, Indianmeal moth (2022)
  - Plutella xylostella, moth (diamondback moth) (2013)
  - Scrobipalpa atriplicella, Goosefoot groundling moth (2024)
  - Spodoptera frugiperda, Fall armyworm (2017)
  - Thitarodes armoricanus, Himalaya ghost moth (2024)
  - Thitarodes xiaojinensis, Xiaojin ghost moth (2024)
  - Troides aeacus, Golden birdwing (2024)
  - Eudocima phalonia, fruit-piercing moth (2017)
- Order Orthoptera
  - Locusta migratoria, migratory locust (2014)
  - Schistocerca gregaria, desert locust (2020)
  - Gryllus bimaculatus, two-spotted cricket (2021)
- Order Phthiraptera
  - Pediculus humanus, louse (sucking louse; parasite) (2010)
  - Menopon gallinae, Poutlry shaft louse (2024)
- Psocoptera
  - Liposcelis brunnea, booklouse (2022)
- Order Raphidioptera
  - Venustoraphidia nigricollis, black-necked snakefly (2023)
- Order Trichoptera
  - Eubasilissa regina, purple caddisfly (2022,)
  - Stenopsyche tienmushanensisi, Caddisfly (2018)
- Order Mantodea
  - Tenodera sinensis, chinese praying mantis (2023)

=== Crustaceans ===
- Acartia tonsa dana, cosmopolitan calanoid copepod (2019)
- Cherax quadricarinatus, Red claw crayfish (2020)
- Daphnia pulex, water flea (2007)
- Eulimnadia texana, Clam Shrimp (2018)
- Macrobrachium nipponense, oriental river prawn (2021)
- Neocaridina denticulata, shrimp (2014)
- Parhyale hawaiensis, amphipod (2016)
- Pollicipes pollicipes, Gooseneck barnacle (2022)
- Portunus trituberculatus, swimming crab (2020)
- Procambarus virginalis, marbled crayfish (2018)
- Sphaeroma terebrans, a wood-boring isopod (2019)
- Tigriopus kingsejongensis, antarctic-endemic copepod (2017)

=== Chelicerates ===
Order Xiphosura:

- Limulus polyphemus, Atlantic horseshoe crab (2014)
- Carcinoscorpius rotundicauda, mangrove horseshoe crab (2021)
- Tachypleus gigas, coastal horseshoe crab (2020)
- Tachypleus tridentatus, tri-spine horseshoe crab (2021)

Order Ixodida:

- Ixodes scapularis, deer tick (2016)

Order Mesostigmata:

- Tropilaelaps mercedesae, honeybee mite (2017)

Order Trombidiformes:

- Tetranychus urticae, spider mite (2011)

Order Scorpiones:

- Mesobuthus martensii, Chinese scorpion (2013)

Order Araneae:

- Acanthoscurria geniculata, Brazilian whiteknee tarantula (2014)
- Argiope bruennichi, European wasp spider (2021)
- Dysdera silvatica, Canary Island nocturnal endemic woodlouse spider (2019)
- Latrodectus elegans, Black widow spider (2022)
- Latrodectus hasselti, Redback spider (2026)
- Latrodectus katipo, Katipō (2026)
- Leviellus thorelli, sector orb-weaver (2026)
- Nephila clavipes, (golden silk orb-weaver) (2017)
- Parasteatoda tepidariorum, (common house spider) (2017)
- Stegodyphus mimosarum, African social velvet spider (2014)
- Uloborus diversus, Cribellate orb-weaving spider, (2023)

Order Uropygi:

- Mastigoproctus giganteus, giant whip scorpion or vinegaroon (2025)

=== Myriapods ===
- Strigamia maritima, centipede
- Trigoniulus corallinus, millipede

== Onychophora (Velvet Worms) ==
Family	Species	Assembly Name	Genome Size	Number of Predicted Genes	Reference	Assembly status

== Tardigrades ==
- Hypsibius dujardini, water bear (2015)

Family	Species	Assembly Name	Genome Size	Number of Predicted Genes	Reference	Assembly status

== Nematodes ==
- Ancylostoma ceylanicum, zoonotic hookworm infecting both humans and other mammals (2015)
- Aplectana chamaeleonis, amphibian parasite (2023)
- Ascaris suum, pig-infecting giant roundworm, closely related to human-infecting giant roundworm Ascaris lumbricoides (2011)
- Brugia malayi (Strain:TRS), human-infecting filarial parasite (2007)
- Bursaphelenchus xylophilus, infects pine trees (2011)
- Caenorhabditis angaria (Strain:PS1010) (2010)
- Caenorhabditis brenneri, a gonochoristic (male-female obligate) species more closely related to C. briggsae than C. elegans
- Caenorhabditis briggsae (2003)
- Caenorhabditis elegans (Strain:Bristol N2), model organism (1998)
- Caenorhabditis remanei, a gonochoristic (male-female obligate) species more closely related to C. briggsae than C. elegans
- Dirofilaria immitis, dog-infecting filarial parasite (2012)
- Globodera pallida, plant pathogen (2014)
- Haemonchus contortus, blood-feeding parasite infecting sheep and goats (2013)
- Heterodera glycines, soybean cyst nematode (2019)
- Heterorhabditis bacteriophora, (2013)
- Loa loa, human-infecting filarial parasite (2013)
- Meloidogyne hapla, northern root-knot nematode (plant pathogen) (2008)
- Meloidogyne incognita, southern root-knot nematode (plant pathogen) (2008)
- Necator americanus, human-infecting hookworm (2014)
- Onchocerca volvulus, human-infecting filarial parasite
- Pristionchus pacificus, model invertebrate (2008)
- Romanomermis culicivorax, entomopathogenic nematode that invades larvae of various mosquito species (2013)
- Trichuris suis, pig-infecting whipworm (2014)
- Trichuris muris, mouse-infecting whipworm (2014)
- Trichuris trichiura, human-infecting whipworm (2014)
- Wuchereria bancrofti, human-infecting filarial parasite

Family	Species	Assembly Name	Genome Size	Number of Predicted Genes	Reference	Assembly status

== Nematomorpha ==
Family	Species	Assembly Name	Genome Size	Number of Predicted Genes	Reference	Assembly status

== Priapulida ==
Family	Species	Assembly Name	Genome Size	Number of Predicted Genes	Reference	Assembly status

== Kinorhyncha ==
Family	Species	Assembly Name	Genome Size	Number of Predicted Genes	Reference	Assembly status

== Loricifera ==
Family	Species	Assembly Name	Genome Size	Number of Predicted Genes	Reference	Assembly status

== Molluscs ==
=== Polyplacophora (Chitons) ===
Family	Subfamily	Species	Assembly Name	Genome Size	Number of Predicted Genes	Reference	Assembly status
Acanthochitonidae	Acanthochitoninae	Acanthochitona rubrolineata	OUC_Aru_1.0	1.08 Gbp	32,291	2024 draft	
Acanthochitonidae	Cryptochitoninae	Cryptochiton stelleri (Gumboot chiton)					
Chitonidae	Acanthopleurinae	Acanthopleura granulata (Fuzzy Caribbean chiton)				2020	
Chitonidae	Acanthopleurinae	Liolophura japonica (Common chiton)				2024	
Chitonidae	Chitoninae	Chiton olivaceus					
Leptochitonidae		Deshayesiella sirenkoi					
Tonicellidae		Lepidochitona cinerea					
Tonicellidae		Tonicella lineata					
Mopaliidae		Mopalia muscosa					
Mopaliidae		Mopalia vespertina					
Mopaliidae		Mopalia ciliata					
Mopaliidae		Mopalia kennerleyi					
Mopaliidae		Mopalia swanii					
Mopaliidae		Katharina tunicata					
Hanleyidae		Hanleya hanleyi					
Ischnochitonidae		Lepidozona retiporosa					

=== Caudofoveata ===
Family	Species	Assembly Name	Genome Size	Number of Predicted Genes	Reference	Links	Assembly status
Chaetodermatidae	Chaetoderma sp.		2.45 Gbp	23,675	2024 draft	NCBI Database	

=== Cephalopods ===
- Architeuthis dux, giant squid (2020)
- Euprymna scolopes, Hawaiian bobtail squid (2019)
- Hapalochlaena maculosa, Southern blue-ringed octopus (2020)
- Octopus bimaculoides, California two-spot octopus (2015)
- Octopus minor, common long-arm octopus (2018)
- Octopus vulgaris, common octopus (2019)

Family	Species	Assembly Name	Genome Size	Number of Predicted Genes	Reference	Assembly status

=== Bivalves ===
- Argopecten purpuratus, peruvian scallop (2018)
- Bathymodiolus platifrons, seep mussel (2017)
- Chlamys farreri, Zhikong scallop (2017)
- Crassostrea angulata, Portuguese oyster (2023)
- Crassostrea gigas, Pacific oyster (2012)
- Dreissena rostriformis, Quagga mussel (2019)
- Limnoperna fortunei, invasive golden mussel (2017)
- Margaritifera margaritifera, European freshwater pearl mussel (2023)
- Modiolus philippinarum, shallow water mussel (2017)
- Mytilus galloprovincialis, Mediterranean mussel (2016)
- Panopea generosa, Pacific geoduck (2023)
- Patinopecten yessoensis, Yesso scallop (2017)
- Pecten maximus, Great scallop (2020)
- Pinctada fucata, Pearl oyster (2012)
- Ruditapes philippinarum, Manila clam (2017)
- Saccostrea glomerata, Sydney rock oyster (2018)
- Scapharca broughtonii, Blood clam (2019)
- Tridacna crocea, Giant clam (2023)
- Venustaconcha ellipsiformis, freshwater mussel (2018)

Family	Species	Assembly Name	Genome Size	Number of Predicted Genes	Reference	Assembly status

=== Gastropods ===
- Achatina fulica, giant African snail (2019)
- Biomphalaria glabrata, a medically important air-breathing freshwater snail in the family Planorbidae (2017)
- Biomphalaria straminea, Ramshorn snail (2022)
- Candidula unifasciata, Land snail (2021)
- Conus ventricosus, Mediterranean cone snail (2021)
- Elysia chlorotica, a solar-powered sea slug (2019)
- Haliotis discus hannai, pacific abalone (2017)
- Kalloconus canariensis, Canary Island cone shell (2023)
- Kelletia kelletii, Kellet's whelk (2023)
- Lottia gigantea, owl limpet (2013)
- Plakobranchus ocellatus, Kleptoplastic sea slug (2021)
- Pomacea canaliculata, golden apple snail (2018)
- Littorina brevicula, periwinkle snail (2024)
- Littoraria sinensis (2024)

Family	Species	Assembly Name	Genome Size	Number of Predicted Genes	Reference	Assembly status

=== Scaphopods ===
==== Dentaliida ====
Family	Species	Assembly Name	Genome Size	Number of Predicted Genes	Reference	Assembly status
Dentaliidae	Pictodentalium vernedei				2023	

==== Gadilida ====
Family	Species	Assembly Name	Genome Size	Number of Predicted Genes	Reference	Assembly status
Gadilidae	Siphonodentalium dalli				2023	

== Platyhelminthes ==
- Clonorchis sinensis, liver fluke (human pathogen) (draft 2011)
- Echinococcus granulosus, tapeworm (dog pathogen) (2013, 2013)
- Echinococcus multilocularis, tapeworm (2013)
- Hymenolepis microstoma, tapeworm (2013)
- Schistosoma haematobium, schistosome (human pathogen) (2012 2019)
- Schistosoma japonicum, schistosome (human pathogen) (2009)
- Schistosoma mansoni, schistosome (human pathogen) (2009, 2012)
- Schmidtea mediterranea, planarian (model organism) (2006)
- Taenia solium, tapeworm (2013)

Family	Species	Assembly Name	Genome Size	Number of Predicted Genes	Reference	Assembly status

== Annelids ==
- Capitella teleta, polychaete (2007, 2013)
- Helobdella robusta, leech (2007, 2013)
- Eisenia fetida, earthworm (2015, 2016)
- Paraescarpia echinospica, deep-sea tubeworm (2021,)
- Hirudinaria manillensis, Asian Buffalo leech (2023)
- Hirudo nipponia, Japanese blood-sucking leech (2023)
- Whitmania pigra, Asian freshwater leech (2023)

Family	Species	Assembly Name	Genome Size	Number of Predicted Genes	Reference	Assembly status

== Bryozoa ==
- Bugula neritina, bryozoan (2020,)

Family	Species	Assembly Name	Genome Size	Number of Predicted Genes	Reference	Assembly status

== Brachiopoda ==
- Lingula anatina, brachiopod (2015,)

Family	Species	Assembly Name	Genome Size	Number of Predicted Genes	Reference	Assembly status

== Rotifera ==
- Adineta vaga, rotifer (2013,)

== See also ==
- Lists of sequenced genomes
- List of sequenced bacterial genomes
- List of sequenced archaeal genomes
- List of sequenced eukaryotic genomes
- List of sequenced mitochondrial genomes
- List of sequenced plastomes
- List of sequenced animal mitochondrial genomes
- List of sequenced fungi genomes
- List of sequenced fungi mitochondrial genomes
- List of sequenced plant genomes
- List of sequenced plant mitochondrial genomes
- List of sequenced protist genomes
