= Transmembrane protein 222 =

Protein found in humans

TMEM222

Identifiers
- Aliases: TMEM222, C1orf160, transmembrane protein 222, NEDMOSBA
- External IDs: MGI: 1098568; GeneCards: TMEM222

Gene location (Human)
Chr.	Chromosome 1 (human)
Band	1p36.11	Start	27,322,145 bp
Band	1p36.11	End	27,336,400 bp

Gene location (Mouse)
Chr.	Chromosome 4 (mouse)
Band	4 D2.3|4 66.25 cM	Start	132,993,356 bp
Band	4 D2.3|4 66.25 cM	End	133,005,103 bp
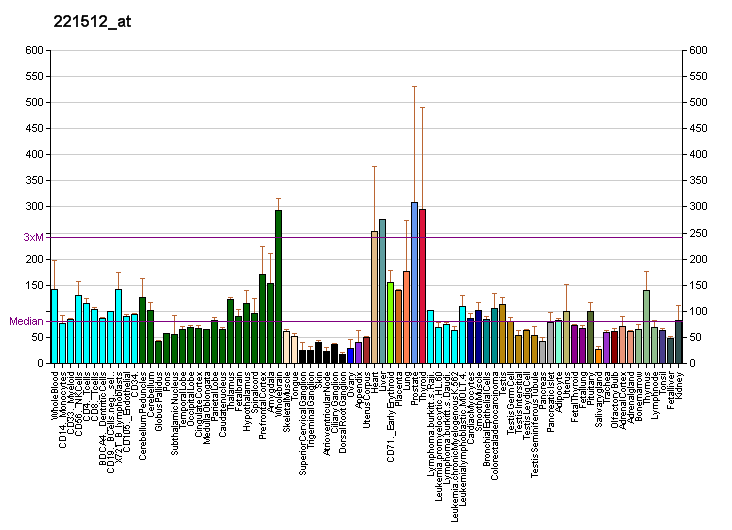

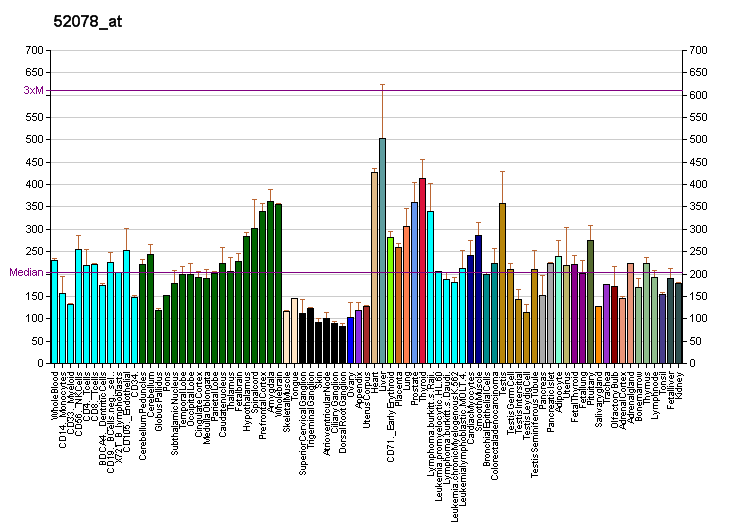
RNA expression pattern
Bgee	Human / Mouse (ortholog); Top expressed in: hypothalamus; right frontal lobe; amygdala; nucleus accumbens; putamen; anterior pituitary; cingulate gyrus; anterior cingulate cortex; apex of heart; right hemisphere of cerebellum / Top expressed in: superior frontal gyrus; primary visual cortex; spermatocyte; dentate gyrus of hippocampal formation granule cell; lip; granulocyte; yolk sac; neural layer of retina; habenula; cerebellar cortex; More reference expression data
BioGPS	More reference expression data
Orthologs
Databases	NCBI: entry; OMA: entry
Species	Human	Mouse
Entrez	84065	52174
Ensembl	ENSG00000186501	ENSMUSG00000028857
UniProt	Q9H0R3	Q8BVA2
RefSeq (mRNA)	NM_032125	NM_025667
RefSeq (protein)	NP_115501	NP_079943
Location (UCSC)	Chr 1: 27.32 – 27.34 Mb	Chr 4: 132.99 – 133.01 Mb
PubMed search
- Wikidata
View/Edit Human	View/Edit Mouse

Transmembrane protein 222 is a protein that in humans is encoded by the TMEM222 gene. One notable feature of the protein encoded by this gene is the presence of three predicted transmembrane domains. The TMEM222 protein is predicted to most likely localize to the secretory vesicles.

== Gene features ==
TMEM222 has a domain of unknown function (DUF778). Aliases of this gene include DKFZP564D0478, RP11-4K3__A.4, C1orf160, and MGC111002. Accession NM_032125.2, the longest coding sequence (1629 bp), encodes a protein of 208 amino acid residues (23230 daltons), which is considered the consensus coding sequence (CCDS297.2). There are two isoforms of the protein encoded by this gene. They are similar except the second (Q9H0R3-2) is lacking the first 96 amino acid residues that are present in the first (Q9H0R3-1).

== Gene expression ==
ACEVIEW has labeled TMEM222 as highly expressed with 3.8 times more expression than the average gene in the database. There is expression evidence from 166 tissues including brain, lung, colon, kidney, and placenta.

== Homology ==
Orthologs and distant homologs of the human TMEM222 have been identified throughout Eukaryota especially in plants and animals. No paralogs of this gene have been found in the human genome.

Genus/Species	Common name	Accession number	Length	Similarity	Identity
Rattus norvegicus	Rat	NP_001107252.1	208aa	99%	96%
Canis familiaris	Dog	XP_852505.1	208aa	98%	96%
Mus musculus	Mouse	NP_079943.2	208aa	96%	95%
Sus scrofa	Pig	XP_003127773.1	208aa	97%	94%
Equus caballus	Horse	XP_001917747.1	207aa	94%	93%
Gallus gallus	Chicken	XP_417729.1	182aa	90%	85%
Danio rerio	Zebrafish	NP_001013334.1	174aa	83%	71%
Anopheles gambiae	Mosquito	XP_320483.3	197aa	66%	53%
Drosophila melanogaster	Fruit Fly	NP_723362.1	196aa	74%	61%
Caenorhabditis elegans	Nematode	NP_494762.2	168aa	72%	55%
Phytophthora infestans	Late Blight	XP_002902629.1	186aa	59%	48%
Zea mays	Corn	NP_001144071.1	233aa	61%	44%
Oryza sativa	Rice	NP_001051577.1	204aa	61%	43%
Arabidopsis thaliana	Thall cress	NP_190673.1	231aa	55%	36%
Homo sapiens	Human	NP_115501.2	208	-	-

== Distant homolog ==
A distant homolog of TMEM222, RTH (RTE1-Homolog), is a homolog of RTE1 (Reversion-to-Ethylene Perception 1), which is known to induce conformational changes in ETR1 (Ethylene receptor 1) that result in negative regulation corresponding with loss of ethylene perception.

== Protein interactions ==
Evidence from yeast two-hybrid screening exists for two protein interactions with this gene. One is a serine protease (PRSS23) that has been identified to be involved in mouse ovulation and is excreted into the extracellular matrix. The other protein is an ab-hydrolase (HLA-B associated transcript 5) that is integral to the membrane, and its corresponding gene is located in the genome near tumor necrosis factor (TNF)-alpha and TNF-beta.
