= CYP6M2 =

Gene location in Anopheles gambiae chromosome 3R

Cytochrome P450 6m2

Identifiers
- Organism: Anopheles gambiae
- Symbol: Cyp6m2
- Entrez: 5668319
- Orthologs: NCBI: entry

Other data
- EC number: 1.14.-.-

CYP6M2 is a gene location in Anopheles gambiae chromosome 3R, involved in the insecticide resistant. The enzyme encoded by this gene is capable of directly metabolizing pyrethroids, belongs to the cytochrome P450 family CYP6
