= Red rattlesnake =

Red rattlesnake may refer to:

- Crotalus ruber, a.k.a. the red diamond rattlesnake, a venomous pitviper species found in southwestern California in the United States and Baja California in Mexico
- Crotalus pyrrhus, a.k.a. the Southwestern speckled rattlesnake, a venomous pitviper species found in the southwestern United States
