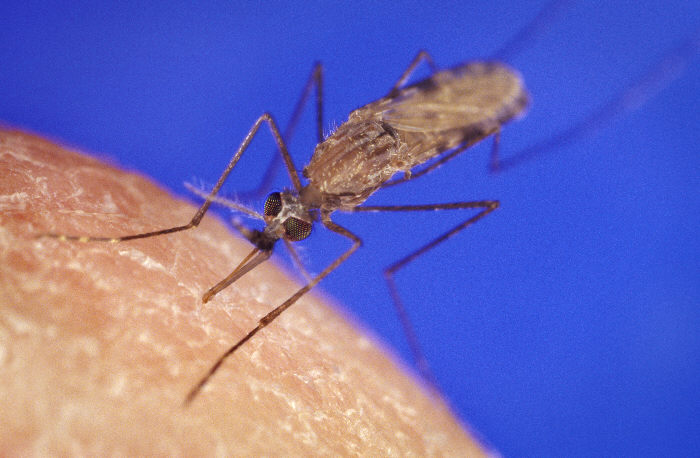

Scientific classification
- Kingdom: Animalia
- Phylum: Arthropoda
- Clade: Pancrustacea
- Class: Insecta
- Order: Diptera
- Family: Culicidae
- Genus: Anopheles
- Species complex: Anopheles gambiae species complex Giles 1902

Species
- A. arabiensis; A. bwambae; A. melas; A. merus; A. quadriannulatus; A. gambiae sensu stricto; A. coluzzii; A. amharicus

= Anopheles gambiae =

Species complex of mosquitos

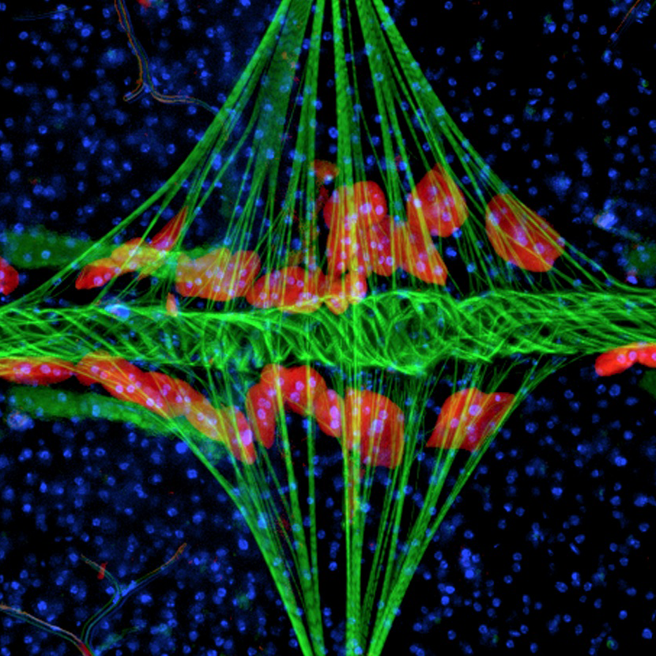
The tube-like heart (green) extends along the body, interlinked with the diamond-shaped alary muscles (also green) and surrounded by pericardial cells (red). Blue depicts cell nuclei.

The Anopheles gambiae complex consists of at least seven morphologically indistinguishable species of mosquitoes in the genus Anopheles. The complex was recognised in the 1960s and includes the most important vectors of malaria in sub-Saharan Africa, particularly of the most dangerous malaria parasite, Plasmodium falciparum. It is one of the most efficient malaria vectors known. The An. gambiae mosquito additionally transmits Wuchereria bancrofti which causes lymphatic filariasis, a symptom of which is elephantiasis.

== Discovery and elements ==
The Anopheles gambiae complex or Anopheles gambiae sensu lato was recognized as a species complex only in the 1960s. The A. gambiae complex consists of:

- Anopheles arabiensis Patton, 1905
- Anopheles bwambae White, 1985
- Anopheles melas Theobald, 1903
- Anopheles merus Dönitz, 1902
- Anopheles quadriannulatus (Theobald, 1911)
- Anopheles gambiae Giles, 1902 sensu stricto (s.s.)
- Anopheles coluzzii Coetzee & Wilkerson in Coetzee et al., 2013
- Anopheles amharicus Hunt, Wilkerson & Coetzee in Coetzee et al., 2013

The individual species of the complex are morphologically difficult to distinguish from each other, although it is possible for larvae and adult females. The species exhibit different behavioural traits. For example, Anopheles quadriannulatus is both a saltwater and mineralwater species. A. melas and A. merus are saltwater species, while the remainder are freshwater species. Anopheles quadriannulatus generally takes its blood meal from animals (zoophilic), whereas Anopheles gambiae sensu stricto generally feeds on humans, i.e. is considered anthropophilic. Identification to the individual species level using the molecular methods of Scott et al. (1993) can have important implications in subsequent control measures.

== Anopheles gambiae in the strict sense ==
An. gambiae sensu stricto (s.s.) has been discovered to be currently in a state of diverging into two different species—the Mopti (M) and Savannah (S) strains—though as of 2007, the two strains are still considered to be a single species.

A mechanism of species recognition using the sound emitted by the wings and identified by Johnston's organ was proposed in 2010, however this mechanism has never been confirmed since, and the overall mechanism theory through "harmonic convergence" has been challenged.

== Genome ==
An. gambiae s.s. genomes have been sequenced three times, once for the M strain, once for the S strain, and once for a hybrid strain. Currently, ~90 miRNA have been predicted in the literature (38 miRNA officially listed in miRBase) for An. gambiae s.s. based upon conserved sequences to miRNA found in Drosophila. Holt et al., 2002 and Neafsey et al., 2016 find transposable elements to be ~13% of the genome, similar to Drosophila melanogaster (also in Diptera). However they find the proportion of TE types to be very different from D. melanogaster with approximately the same composition of long terminal repeat retrotransposons, non-long terminal repeat retrotransposons and DNA transposons. These proportions are believed to be representative of the genus.

The genetics and genomics of sex chromosomes have been discovered and studied by Windbichler et al., 2007 and Galizi et al., 2014 (a Physarum polycephalum homing endonuclease which destroys X chromosomes), Windbichler et al., 2008 and Hammond et al., 2016 (methods to reduce the female population), Windbichler et al., 2011 (trans from yeast), Bernardini et al., 2014 (a method to increase the male population), Kyrou et al., 2018 (a female necessary exon and a homing endonuclease to drive it), Taxiarchi et al., 2019 (sex chromosome dynamics in general) and Simoni et al., 2020 (an X chromosome destroying site specific nuclease). See § Gene drive below for their applications.

An. gambiae has a high degree of polymorphism. This is especially true in the cytochrome P450s, Wilding et al., 2009 finding 1 single nucleotide polymorphism (SNP)/26 base pairs. This species has the highest amount of polymorphism in the CYPs of any insect known, much tending to be found in "scaffolds" that are found only in particular subpopulations. These are termed "dual haplotype regions" by Holt et al., 2002 who sequenced the PEST strain.

In common with many chromosomes, An. gambiae codes for spindle and kinetochore-associated proteins. Hanisch et al., 2006 locate AgSka1, the spindle and kinetochore-associated protein 1 gene, at EAL39257.

The entire Culicidae family may or may not conserve epigenetic mechanisms – as of 2012 this remains unresolved. Toward answering this question, Marhold et al., 2004 compare their own previous work in Drosophila melanogaster against new sequences of D. pseudoobscura and An. gambiae. They find all three do share the DNA methylation enzyme DNMT2 (DmDNMT2, DpDNMT2, and AgDNMT2). This suggests all Diptera may conserve an epigenetic system employing Dnmt2.

== Hosts ==
Hosts include cattle, goats, sheep and wild boar.

== Parasites ==
Parasites include Plasmodium berghei (for which it also serves as a vector), and the bioinsecticides/entomopathogenic fungi Metarhizium robertsii and Beauveria bassiana. All three of these parasites combine with insecticides to reduce fitness – see § Insecticides below. CRISPR/Cas9 and U6-gRNA are increasingly (as of 2020) being used together for knockout experiments in mosquitoes. Dong et al., 2018 develops and presents a new U6-gRNA+Cas9 technique in An. gambiae, and utilizes it to knock out fibrinogen related protein 1 (FREP1), thereby severely reducing infection of the mosquito by P. berghei and P. falciparum. However this also demonstrates the centrality of FREP1 to the insect's success, impairing all measured activities across all life stages. Yang et al., 2020 uses the Dong method to do the same with mosGILT, also severely reducing Plasmodium infection of the mosquito but also finding a vital life process is impaired, in mosGILT's case ovary development.

== Control ==
=== Insecticides ===
Parasites/bioinsecticides and chemical insecticides synergistically reduce fitness. Saddler et al., 2015 finds even An. gambiae with knockdown resistance (kdr) are more susceptible to DDT if they are first infected with Plasmodium berghei and Farenhorst et al., 2009 the same for Metarhizium robertsii or Beauveria bassiana. This is probably due to an effect found by Félix et al., 2010 and Stevenson et al., 2011: An. gambiae alters various activities – especially CYP6M2 – in response to P. berghei invasion. CYP6M2 is known to somehow produce pyrethroid resistance, and pyrethroids and DDT share a mechanism of action.

=== Gene drive ===
Research relevant to the development of gene drive controls of An. gambiae have been performed by Windbichler et al., 2007, Windbichler et al., 2008, Windbichler et al., 2011, Bernardini et al., 2014, Galizi et al., 2014, Hammond et al., 2016, Kyrou et al., 2018, Taxiarchi et al., 2019 and Simoni et al., 2020. For specific genes involved see § Genome above. These can all be used in pest control because they induce infertility.

== Fecundity ==
Fecundity of An. gambiae depends on the detoxification of reactive oxygen species (ROS) by catalase. Reduction in catalase activity significantly reduces reproductive output of female mosquitoes, indicating that catalase plays a central role in protecting oocytes and early embryos from ROS damage.

== Historical note ==
An. gambiae invaded northeastern Brazil in 1930, which led to a malaria epidemic in 1938/1939. The Brazilian government assisted by the Rockefeller Foundation in a programme spearheaded by Fred Soper eradicated these mosquitoes from this area. This effort was modeled on the earlier success in eradication of Aedes aegypti as part of the yellow fever control program. The exact species involved in this epidemic has been identified as An. arabiensis.

== Peptide hormones ==
Kaufmann and Brown 2008 find the An. gambiae adipokinetic hormone (AKH) mobilizes carbohydrates but not lipids. Meanwhile AKH/Corazonin Peptide (ACP) does not mobilize (or inhibit mobilization) of either. Mugumbate et al., 2013 provides in solution and membrane bound structures from a nuclear magnetic resonance investigation.
