= Adipokinetic hormone =

Metabolic neuropeptides

Adipokinetic hormones (AKHs) are metabolic neuropeptides, mediating mobilization of energy substrates in many insects.

== History ==
An English group first purified AKH in 1976. The chemical structure was determined to be a peptide hormone formed from 10 amino acids. This was the first insect peptide hormone to be identified. After AKH was identified in cockroaches, locust AKH was inserted into a cockroach. A similar increase in lipid mobilization was observed. Conversely, cockroach AKH led to similar activity within a locust. AKH was initially discovered in the locusts Locusta migratoria and Schistocerca gregaria. It is generally associated with aiding flight. Lipids are transported from the hemolymph and metabolized by flight muscle in order to maintain flight. However, a high concentration of lipids remains in the hemolymph, implying that an agent may be responsible for activating lipid transport into the hemolymph. This was thought most likely to be a function of hormonal regulation. The hormone itself is part of a larger family, often referred to as red pigment concentrating hormones (RPCH) discovered in crustaceans. The consensus nomenclature is based on the name of the species in which the hormone was discovered and validated.

== Sequence ==
More than 100 AKH sequences are known. The typical makeup of hormones in this family includes a length between 8 and 10 amino acids, blocked N (pyroglutamic acid) and C (amidation) termini, with hydrophic residues at position 2, asparagine or threonine at position 3, phenylalanine or tyrosine at position 4, and serine or threonine at position 5. AKH sequence characteristics also include tryptophan at position 8 and in about two-thirds of the known AKHs, proline at position 6. AKHs can be modified (C-mannosylated tryptophan, proline hydroxylation, threonine phosphorylation, possible proline isomerisation, threonine O-sulfonation). Mass spectrometry is increasingly used for de novo sequencing of these hormones. Sequence prediction from genomic and transcriptomic data assist in hormone identification. AKH sequences differ slightly in insect families (Scarabaeoidea, Cucujiformia, Lepidoptera, Diptera, Hemiptera, Polyphaga).

== Significance ==
AKH has become an important area of study, particularly in insect crop pests and insects that act as intermediate or vector hosts for parasites that can affect humans or animals. In experiments where locusts were injected with AKH and lipopolysaccharide (LPS–an immune elicitor found in the cell walls of bacteria) a stronger immune response was observed than in locusts that only received an LPS injection. The spread of malaria by the female mosquito, Anopheles gambiae, is partly dependent on the adipokinetic hormone, Anoga-HrTH (pGlu-Leu-Thr-Phe-Thr-Pro-Ala-Trp-NH2). No crystal structure of this important neuropeptide is available. The NMR restrained molecular dynamic was used to investigate its conformational space in aqueous solution and when bound to a membrane surface. The results showed that Anoga-HrTH has an almost cyclic conformation that is stabilized by a hydrogen bond between the C-terminus and Thr3. When the agonist docks to its receptor, this H-bond is broken and the molecule adopts a more extended structure. Preliminary AKHR docking calculations give the free energy of binding to be −47.30 kJ/mol. Information about the 3D structure and binding mode of Anoga-HrTH to its receptor are vital for the design of suitable mimetics which can act as insecticides.

== Literature ==
- "AKH: A hormone for all seasons?". Advances in invertebrate (neuro)endocrinology : a collection of reviews in the post-genomic era. Oakville, ON, Canada: Apple Academic Press. 2020. p. 129. ISBN 9780429264450.
