= TRNA (cytosine38-C5)-methyltransferase =

Class of enzymes

Identifiers
- EC no.: 2.1.1.204

Databases
- IntEnz: IntEnz view
- BRENDA: BRENDA entry
- ExPASy: NiceZyme view
- KEGG: KEGG entry
- MetaCyc: metabolic pathway
- PRIAM: profile
- PDB structures: RCSB PDB PDBe PDBsum
Search
- PMC: articles
- PubMed: articles
- NCBI: proteins

tRNA (cytosine38-C5)-methyltransferase (EC 2.1.1.204), is an enzyme involved in the methylation of transfer RNA which in humans is encoded by the gene TRDMT1 (previously DNMT2). Its systematic name is S-adenosyl-L-methionine:tRNA (cytosine38-C5)-methyltransferase. This enzyme catalyses the following chemical reaction:

S-adenosyl-L-methionine + cytosine^{38} in tRNA $\rightleftharpoons$ S-adenosyl-L-homocysteine + 5-methylcytosine^{38} in tRNA

In particular, the eukaryotic enzyme catalyses methylation of cytosine^{38} in the anti-codon loop of tRNAAsp(GTC), tRNAVal(AAC) and tRNAGly(GCC).

== See also ==
- TRDMT1
