= CYP6 family =

Group of cytochrome P450 enzymes

Cytochrome P450, family 6, also known as CYP6, is a cytochrome P450 family found in Insect genome. CYP6 and CYP9, another insect CYP family, belong to the same clan as mammalian CYP3 and CYP5 families.

The first two CYP6 subfamilies represented by CYP6A1 and CYP6B1 shared only 32.7% identity, less than the typical CYP subfamilies, which share at least 40% amino acid identity.

Many of the enzymes in this family like CYP6G1 (DDT-R) in Drosophila melanogaster and CYP6B in Helicoverpa armigera are related to insecticide resistance.
