= CYP9 family =

Group of cytochrome P450 enzymes

Cytochrome P450, family 9, also known as CYP9, is a cytochrome P450 family found in Insect genome, CYP9 and insect CYP6 family belong to the same clan as mammalian CYP3 and CYP5 families. The first gene identified in this family is the CYP9A1 from the Heliothis virescens (tobacco budworm), which is involved in thiodicarb insecticide resistance. Subfamily CYP9A in Lepidopteran play important roles in insecticide resistance, can metabolize esfenvalerate efficiently.
