= TRDMT1 =

Protein-coding gene in the species Homo sapiens

Identifiers
- Aliases: TRDMT1, DMNT2, DNMT2, MHSAIIP, PUMET, RNMT1, tRNA aspartic acid methyltransferase 1
- External IDs: OMIM: 602478; MGI: 1274787; GeneCards: TRDMT1
Available structures
PDB	Ortholog search: PDBe RCSB
PDB	List of PDB id codes 1G55
Enzyme activity
EC #	BRENDA	ExPASy	KEGG	MetaCyc
2.1.1.204	↗	↗	↗	↗

Gene location (Human)
Chr.	Chromosome 10 (human)
Band	10p13	Start	17,137,336 bp
Band	10p13	End	17,202,054 bp

Gene location (Mouse)
Chr.	Chromosome 2 (mouse)
Band	2|2 A1	Start	13,513,825 bp
Band	2|2 A1	End	13,549,479 bp
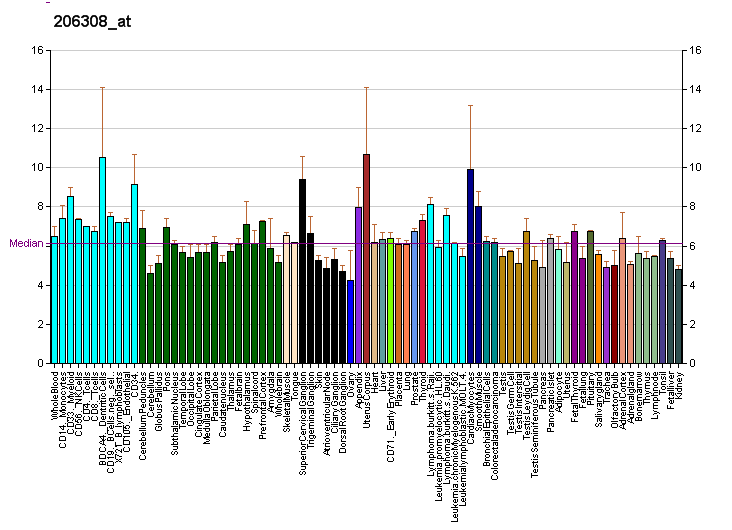
RNA expression pattern
Bgee	Human / Mouse (ortholog); Top expressed in: ventricular zone; buccal mucosa cell; Achilles tendon; ganglionic eminence; right uterine tube; testicle; epithelium of colon; monocyte; sural nerve; gonad / Top expressed in: otic placode; saccule; otic vesicle; atrioventricular valve; spermatocyte; granulocyte; secondary oocyte; zygote; primitive streak; primary oocyte; More reference expression data
BioGPS	More reference expression data
Gene ontology
Molecular function	methyltransferase activity; transferase activity; tRNA methyltransferase activity; RNA binding; tRNA (cytosine-5-)-methyltransferase activity
Cellular component	cytoplasm; nucleus; nucleoplasm
Biological process	response to amphetamine; methylation; tRNA methylation; tRNA modification; tRNA processing
Sources:Amigo / QuickGO
Orthologs
Databases	NCBI: entry; OMA: entry
Species	Human	Mouse
Entrez	1787	13434
Ensembl	ENSG00000107614	ENSMUSG00000026723
UniProt	O14717	O55055
RefSeq (mRNA)	NM_004412; NM_176081; NM_176083; NM_176084; NM_176085 NM_176086; NM_001321006; NM_001321007; NM_001351219; NM_001351220; NM_001351221; NM_001351222; NM_001351223	NM_010067
RefSeq (protein)	NP_001307935; NP_001307936; NP_004403; NP_001338148; NP_001338149 NP_001338150; NP_001338151; NP_001338152	NP_034197
Location (UCSC)	Chr 10: 17.14 – 17.2 Mb	Chr 2: 13.51 – 13.55 Mb
PubMed search
- Wikidata
View/Edit Human	View/Edit Mouse

tRNA (cytosine-5-)-methyltransferase is an enzyme that in humans is encoded by the TRDMT1 gene (previously denoted DNMT2).

CpG methylation is an epigenetic modification that is important for embryonic development, imprinting, and X-chromosome inactivation. Studies in mice have demonstrated that DNA methylation is required for mammalian development. This gene encodes a protein with similarity to DNA methyltransferases, but this protein does not display methyltransferase activity. The protein strongly binds DNA, suggesting that it may mark specific sequences in the genome. Alternative splicing results in multiple transcript variants encoding different isoforms.

It has been shown that human DNMT2 does not methylate DNA but instead methylates cytosine 38 in the anticodon loop of aspartic acid transfer RNA (tRNA(Asp)).

== See also ==
- TRNA (cytosine38-C5)-methyltransferase
