= Cordylomorpha =

Scientific classification
- Kingdom: Animalia
- Phylum: Chordata
- Class: Reptilia
- Order: Squamata
- (unranked): Cordylomorpha Vidal & Hedges, 2009

Superfamilies and families
- Superfamily Cordyloidea; Cordylidae (girdled lizards); Gerrhosauridae (plated lizards); Superfamily Xantusioidea; Xantusiidae (night lizards)

Proposed clade of lizards

Cordylomorpha is a clade of lizards proposed by Nicolas Vidal and S. Blair Hedges in 2009 to unite the girdled lizards (Cordylidae) and plated lizards (Gerrhosauridae) - together comprising the superfamily Cordyloidea - with the night lizards (Xantusiidae). Vidal and Hedges introduced the name as an "unranked taxon" within their suborder Scinciformata, and at the same time restricted Scincomorpha to a single family (Scincidae).

== Phylogeny ==
The composition of Cordylomorpha is congruent with the topology recovered in multiple molecular analyses of squamate relationships, each placing Xantusiidae as the sister group of a Cordylidae+Gerrhosauridae clade. The genome-scale anchored-phylogenomic analysis of Burbrink et al. (2020) likewise recovered this arrangement. A simplified topology based on Burbrink et al. (2020) can be summarised as follows:

- Cordylomorpha
  - Xantusiidae (night lizards)
  - - Cordyloidea
      Gerrhosauridae (plated lizards)
    - Cordylidae (girdled lizards)

== Fossil record ==
Konkasaurus mahalana, described from the Maastrichtian (Upper Cretaceous) of Madagascar, was tentatively referred to Cordylidae; if correctly attributed, it would constitute the oldest known record of the cordylid lineage. Possible cordyliforms have also been reported from the Eocene through Miocene of Europe (reviewed in Čerňanský et al., 2023), with the youngest European occurrences from the latest Miocene–earliest Pliocene of Greece. The xantusiid lineage is documented from the Late Cretaceous of North America onward, and the resulting time-calibrated trees place the divergence of Xantusiidae from Cordyloidea well within the Cretaceous.
