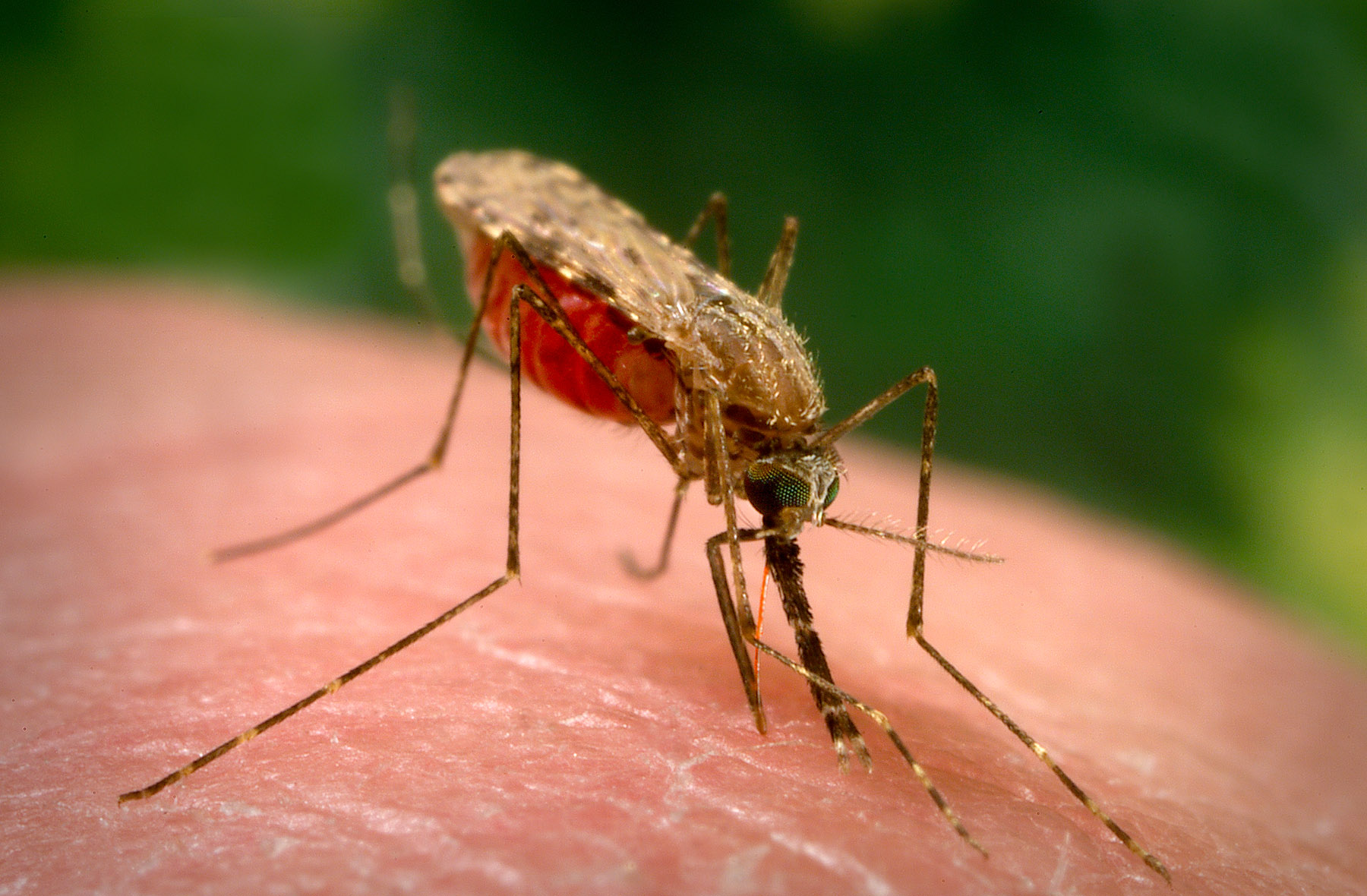

Scientific classification
- Kingdom: Animalia
- Phylum: Arthropoda
- Clade: Pancrustacea
- Class: Insecta
- Order: Diptera
- Family: Culicidae
- Genus: Anopheles
- Subgenus: Cellia
- Species: A. arabiensis

Binomial name
- Anopheles arabiensis Patton, 1905

= Anopheles arabiensis =

African mosquito and disease vector

Anopheles arabiensis is a zoophilic species of mosquito and a vector of disease endemic to Africa.

== Genome ==
Polytene chromosomes have a high degree of gene polymorphism due to paracentric inversions. This is also unusually high for the genus. (See the chapter by Kitzmiller 1976.) There is a well studied adaptive inversion. Kirkpatrick and Barrett 2015 and Sharakhov et al. 2006 find an inversion providing A. arabiensis with some of its adaptation to arid environments. They also find this inversion has been introgressed across more widely in the genus, providing similar adaptive benefit.

== Symbionts ==
Not thought to naturally serve as a host of Wolbachia until Baldini et al. 2018 showed to the contrary.

== Hosts ==
Hosts include Bos taurus. A. arabiensis is especially known as a zoophilic haematophage.

== Parasites ==
Not a vector of Plasmodium berghei.

== Range ==
The distribution is Afrotropical. There was a brief invasion into Brazil in 1930 but this was quickly eradicated. (Note that this was long misidentified as an invasion by A. gambiae. Only with genetic tools and a great deal of time did Parmekalis et al. 2008 find it to really have been A. arabiensis.) The investigations regarding the ecology of A. arabiensis by Gwitira et al. 2018, Ageep et al. 2009 and Fuller et al. 2012a help to model the distribution of various avian malaria pathogens.

Locally A. arabiensis' is especially known as an exophage and exophile. Its movements through the local ecology are not sufficiently studied – Debebe et al. 2018 is one of the few investigations in this question.

== Control ==
Cyhalothrins (including λ-cyhalothrin) and DDT are commonly used. Mnzava et al. 1995 finds differential repellent effects between λc and DDT in the protection of cattle, partly due to DDT's excitorepellency. (Some of the difference is also due to differences in keeping cattle outside or inside. A. arabiensis' proclivity to enter or not enter, and exit or not exit barns treated with λc or DDT makes a difference.)

Sterile insect technique shows promise in A. arabiensis. Irradiation in SIT is not simple however and dosage is a touchy variable. Sterile males are also injured more generally by the process and thus are less competitive. Helinski and Knols 2008 provide dosage information from their experiments with A. arabiensis which is needed to perform SIT successfully.

This process requires separation of the sexes which historically has been done manually, greatly limiting throughput. Mashatola et al. 2018 reviews progress in automation, selective insecticide feeding, and genetic sexing strains.

SIT may also be achieved by genetic modification, disabling the reproductive process. Catteruccia et al. 2005 produced such an A. arabiensis strain and demonstrates more generally that genetic SIT is tractable in this species.

As of 2015 it has only recently been found that adult mosquitoes are vulnerable to entomopathogenic fungi. This has provoked interest in studying this kind of control, especially Kikankie et al. 2010's success with Beauveria bassiana.

Understanding of A. arabiensis' movements through the landscape will need to improve to aid control efforts. Debebe et al. 2018 is one of very few contributions to this area.

=== Insecticide resistance ===
Some resistant A. arabiensis populations are known. Ismail et al. 2018 find a high degree of pyrethroid resistance in Sudan and Opondo et al. 2019 find the same in The Gambia. Hargreaves et al. 2003 finds DDT resistance in South Africa severe enough to impact efficacy. Agricultural runoff encourages DDT resistance: A. arabiensis larvae grow in waste water pools nearby and are encouraged toward resistance by the insecticides applied to the crops. Oliver and Brooke 2013 find this to be especially problematic adjacent to maize cultivation.
