= PRSS23 =

Protein-coding gene in humans

Identifiers
- Aliases: PRSS23, SIG13, SPUVE, ZSIG13, protease, serine 23, serine protease 23
- External IDs: OMIM: 618376; MGI: 1923703; GeneCards: PRSS23

Gene location (Human)
Chr.	Chromosome 11 (human)
Band	11q14.2	Start	86,791,059 bp
Band	11q14.2	End	86,952,910 bp

Gene location (Mouse)
Chr.	Chromosome 7 (mouse)
Band	7|7 D3	Start	89,156,991 bp
Band	7|7 D3	End	89,176,395 bp
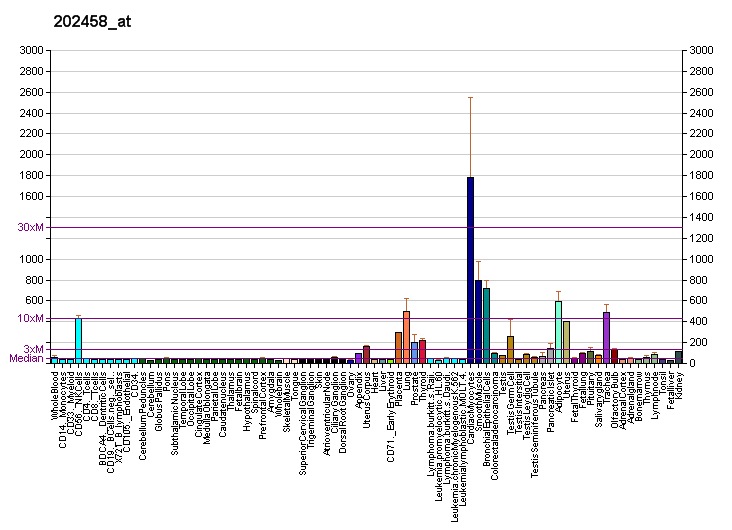
RNA expression pattern
Bgee	Human / Mouse (ortholog); Top expressed in: nasal epithelium; mucosa of paranasal sinus; olfactory zone of nasal mucosa; cartilage tissue; right coronary artery; saphenous vein; decidua; urethra; epithelium of bronchus; bronchial epithelial cell / Top expressed in: endothelial cell of lymphatic vessel; cervix; stroma of bone marrow; conjunctival fornix; seminal vesicula; tunica media of zone of aorta; cornea; vestibular sensory epithelium; calvaria; submandibular gland; More reference expression data
BioGPS	More reference expression data
Gene ontology
Molecular function	peptidase activity; serine-type peptidase activity; serine-type endopeptidase activity; hydrolase activity
Cellular component	extracellular region; extracellular exosome; nucleus; extracellular space; endoplasmic reticulum lumen
Biological process	proteolysis; post-translational protein modification
Sources:Amigo / QuickGO
Orthologs
Databases	NCBI: entry; OMA: entry
Species	Human	Mouse
Entrez	11098	76453
Ensembl	ENSG00000150687	ENSMUSG00000039405
UniProt	O95084	Q9D6X6
RefSeq (mRNA)	NM_001293178; NM_001293179; NM_001293180; NM_007173	NM_029614; NM_001360752; NM_001360753; NM_001360754; NM_001360755 NM_001360756; NM_001384148; NM_001384151
RefSeq (protein)	NP_001280108; NP_001280109; NP_009104	NP_083890; NP_001347681; NP_001347682; NP_001347683; NP_001347684 NP_001347685; NP_001371077; NP_001371080
Location (UCSC)	Chr 11: 86.79 – 86.95 Mb	Chr 7: 89.16 – 89.18 Mb
PubMed search
- Wikidata
View/Edit Human	View/Edit Mouse

Serine protease 23 is an enzyme that in humans is encoded by the PRSS23 gene.

This gene encodes a member of the trypsin family of serine proteases. Mouse studies found a decrease of mRNA levels after ovulation was induced. This gene seems to be highly conserved in vertebrates and may be an important ovarian protease.
