= CYP6G1 =

Protein-coding gene in the species Drosophila melanogaster

Cytochrome P450 6g1

Identifiers
- Organism: Drosophila melanogaster
- Symbol: Cyp6g1
- Alt. symbols: CYP6-like, DDT-R, Rst(2)DDT
- Entrez: 36316
- Orthologs: NCBI: entry; OMA: entry
- RefSeq (mRNA): NM_136899.4
- RefSeq (Prot): NP_610743.2
- UniProt: Q9V674

Other data
- EC number: 1.14.-.-
- Chromosome: 2R: 12.19 - 12.19 Mb
Search for
- Structures: Swiss-model
- Domains: InterPro

Cyp6g1 or DDT-R is an insecticide resistance gene for resistance to DDT in Drosophila melanogaster. It belongs to the cytochrome P450 family and is located in chromosome 2R. Following up their earlier work, Daborn et al. 2002 find the DDT-R gene induces overtranscription of Cyp6g1, of which there are 4 duplicates. They also find several substrates of Cyp6g1, namely DDT, lufenuron, and nitenpyram.
