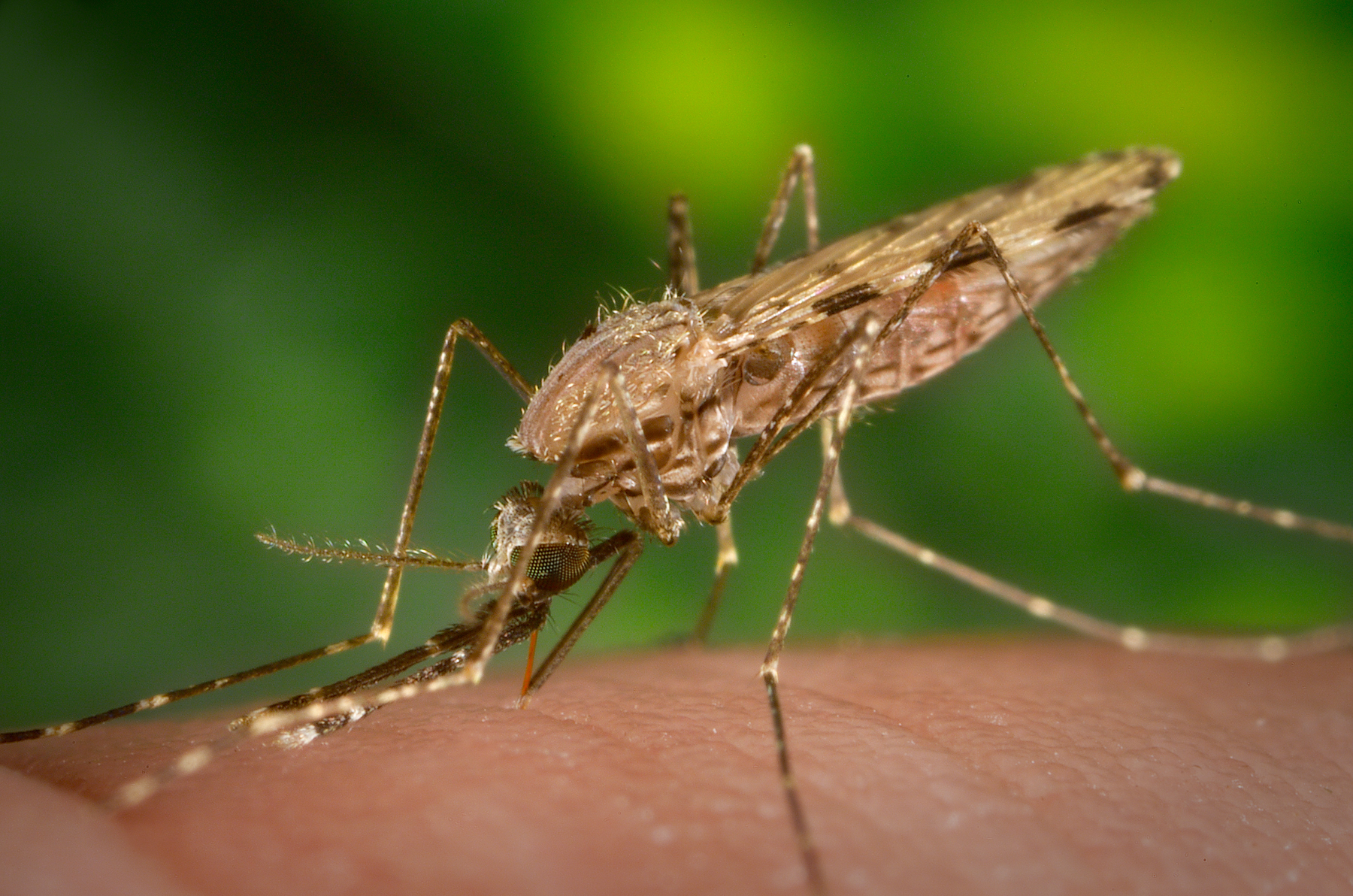

Scientific classification
- Domain: Eukaryota
- Kingdom: Animalia
- Phylum: Arthropoda
- Class: Insecta
- Order: Diptera
- Family: Culicidae
- Genus: Anopheles
- Subgenus: Cellia
- Species: A. quadriannulatus

Binomial name
- Anopheles quadriannulatus Theobald, 1911

= Anopheles quadriannulatus =

Species of mosquito

Anopheles quadriannulatus is a species of mosquito that can be found in Sub-Saharan Africa with the exception of West Africa and Madagascar. The species is a vector of malaria.
