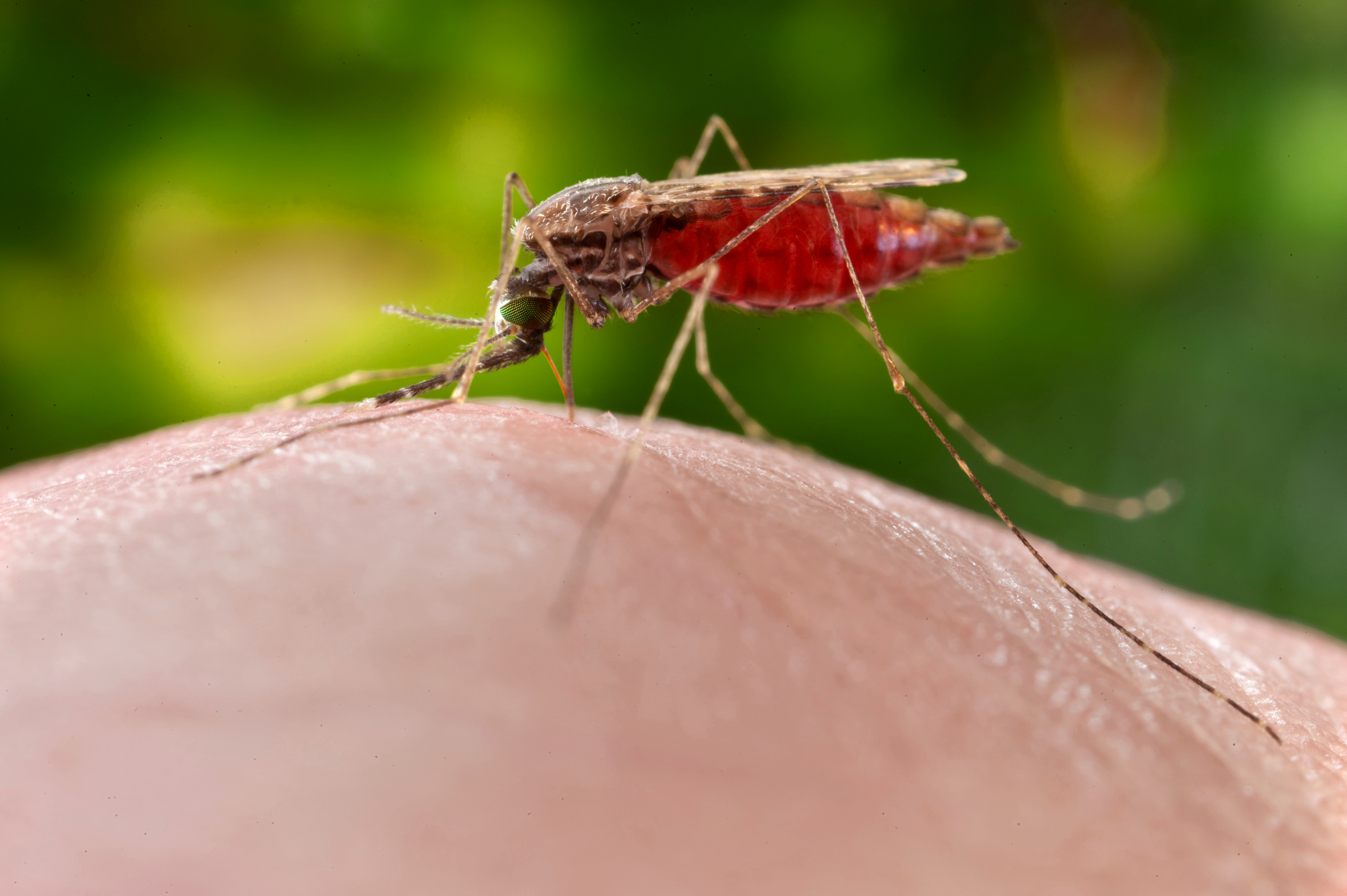

Scientific classification
- Kingdom: Animalia
- Phylum: Arthropoda
- Clade: Pancrustacea
- Class: Insecta
- Order: Diptera
- Family: Culicidae
- Genus: Anopheles
- Subgenus: Cellia
- Species: A. merus

Binomial name
- Anopheles merus Donitz, 1902

= Anopheles merus =

Species of mosquito

Anopheles merus is a species of mosquito that can be found in coastal areas of Eastern and Southern Africa. The species is a main vector of malaria.
