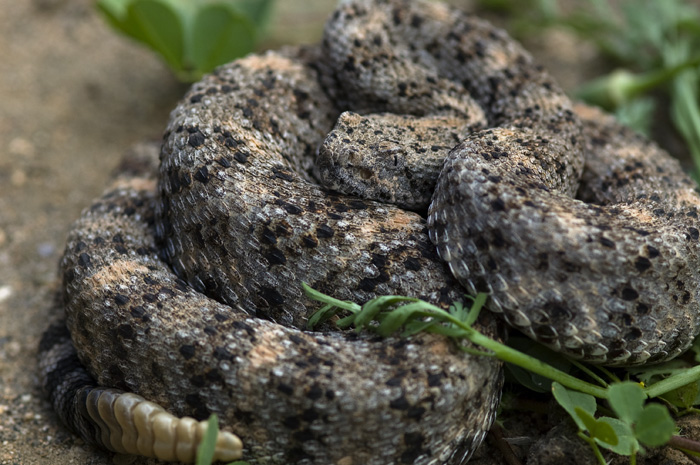

Scientific classification
- Kingdom: Animalia
- Phylum: Chordata
- Class: Reptilia
- Order: Squamata
- Suborder: Serpentes
- Family: Viperidae
- Genus: Crotalus
- Species: C. pyrrhus

Binomial name
- Crotalus pyrrhus (Cope, 1867)

Synonyms
- Caudisona pyrrha Cope, 1867; Crotalus pyrrhus – Yarrow In Wheeler, 1875; Crotalus pyrrhus – Streets, 1877; [Crotalus confluentus] Var. pyrrhus – Garman, 1884; Crotalus Mitchellii pyrrhus – Stejneger, 1895; Crotalus goldmani Schmidt, 1922; Crotalus mitchellii pyrrhus – Klauber, 1936; Crotalus mitchelli [sic] pyrrhus – Klauber, 1952; Crotalus mitchellii pyrrhus – McCrystal & McCoid, 1986

= Crotalus pyrrhus =

Species of snake

Common names: southwestern speckled rattlesnake, Mitchell's rattlesnake, more.

Crotalus pyrrhus is a venomous pitviper species found in the southwestern United States and northwestern Mexico. A medium-sized snake, it is found mostly in rocky country, active at night and feeding on small mammals. The coloration is variable and depends on the color of the rocks and soil of the habitat.

== Description ==
Adults grow to an average length of 3 feet (91 cm), but may sometimes exceed 4 feet (120 cm).

The color pattern is variable, depending on the color of the rocks and soil of the habitat. The snake's ground color may be pink, brown, gray, yellow or nearly white, and speckled with black and white. The pattern (if present) may consist of rhombs, bands or blotches. The tail is ringed.

== Common names ==
Southwestern speckled rattlesnake, bleached rattlesnake, Mitchell's rattlesnake, pale rattler, pallid rattlesnake, red rattlesnake, speckled rattlesnake, white rattlesnake.

The species may also be referred to colloquially by locality phenotypic traits and an abbreviation of "speckled", to "speck" by snake enthusiasts and in the venomous snake commercial trade. Common versions include blue speck, white speck, TA speck (named after the Tinajas Altas mountains in Arizona), lava speck (from the Pisgah Lava Field in California).

== Geographic range ==
Found in the United States in southern California, southern Nevada, southwestern Utah and western Arizona. Also found in Mexico in northwestern Sonora and northern Baja California. No type locality was included in Cope's original 1867 description. Coues In Wheeler (1875) lists it as "Cañon Prieto, a locality near Fort Whipple [Yavapai County], Arizona."

== Habitat ==
Rocky country, including rocky hillsides and canyons, talus slopes and rock ledges. In southern California, these snakes have sometimes been found in chaparral or cactus country, but usually never stray far from the rocks that provide its usual shelter. Not exclusively a rock dweller, they have also been observed emerging from mammal burrows at dusk. The species has been found at elevations of more than 5,000 feet (1,500 m).

== Behavior ==
Primarily nocturnal, these snakes shelter in rock crevices and mammal burrows during the heat of the day. They become more diurnal during the cooler months of the year.

== Feeding ==
The diet consists mostly of small mammals, although birds and lizards are also taken, the latter especially by juveniles. There is one report of a large specimen that contained a nearly grown cottontail rabbit (Sylvilagus auduboni sanctidiegi). Another report describes a specimen that had eaten eight birds, most likely goldfinches, that had been attracted to a small fountain installed as a bird bath at a desert camp.

== Reproduction ==
Ovoviviparous, with females giving birth to as many as 12 live young. Neonates are 12 inches (30 cm) long and prey mostly on lizards.

== Venom ==
Hartnett (1931) describes a case of a man who was bitten on his left thumb. Aside from the sharp stab of the fangs being embedded, there was no pain until after an incision had been made and antivenin had been administered. There was then severe pain that lasted for about an hour after the bite, followed eventually by much discoloration and swelling, his fingers looking like red bananas. His fingers and wrist were covered with blebs and his palm with one large blister.

In another case, a man was bitten on his heel, through his overalls and a sock. At first, the sensation was like being struck by a thorn, with only a drop of blood at fang mark. After 45 minutes and a 1 1/4 miles (2.0 km) walk, a tourniquet was applied and an incision made. Four hours later, his calf was considerably swollen and discolored, which was later followed by pain in the groin. Further symptoms were obscured by the treatment and an uneventful recovery was made.
