= Drosophila sechellia =

Scientific classification
- Kingdom: Animalia
- Phylum: Arthropoda
- Clade: Pancrustacea
- Class: Insecta
- Order: Diptera
- Family: Drosophilidae
- Genus: Drosophila
- Subgenus: Sophophora
- Species group: melanogaster
- Species subgroup: melanogaster
- Species complex: simulans
- Species: D. sechellia

Binomial name
- Drosophila sechellia Tsacas and Baechli, 1981

Species of fly

Drosophila sechellia is a species of fruit fly, used in lab studies of speciation because it can mate with Drosophila simulans.

Drosophila sechellia is endemic to (some of) the Seychelles, and was one of 12 fruit fly genomes sequenced for a large comparative study. Around roughly 250,000-500,000 years ago, the D. Sechellia originated with the youngest of its subgroup, melanogaster, which is also known as the common fruit fly. D. sechellia, is native to the tropical Seychelles archipelago, which is in the Indian Ocean, was discovered in 1980. This organism is a specialized species because it specifically feeds and hosts on Morinda fruit in the Seychelles. However, this limits its reproductive processes, therefore lowering the rate of egg production.

== Morinda fruit ==
Drosophila sechellia are known to preferentially lay eggs on toxic Morinda fruits.

The resistance that the D. sechellia shows to the fruit’s toxins is due to its attraction to the ripe Morinda through its octanoic acid. The presence of this fruit is said to help stimulate egg production, which can be attributed to evolutionary adaptive traits. A plausible evolutionary explanation to this attraction is that, upon its arrival in the Seychelles, the ancestor of Drosophila sechellia used a diversity of resources available such as aged, rotten, and nontoxic Morinda fruits.

Research has shown that a mutation in the gene that inhibits egg production is associated with a reduction in L-DOPA; L-DOPA is a precursor of the fertility-regulating hormone dopamine. Morinda fruits are rich in L-DOPA, owing to their usually insecticidal capacities. Drosophila sechellia fertility is reliant on the L-DOPA found in Morinda fruit, and as a result Drosophila sechellia reproduces solely on these toxic fruits. Recent research found that reduced expression of a newly discovered gene, Esterase 6 (Est6), is an important element of the genetic underpinnings behind the adaptation of D. Sechellia to feed on Morinda fruits.

Compared to other species and close relatives, the D. sechellia is found to have lower female adult reproductive potential, as it is shown to produce fewer ovarioles than the D. simulans, but also produces large eggs. This can lead to the evidence in which the evolution of ovoviviparity in D. sechellia is a result to avoid competition and possible exploitation of an unoccupied niche. An evolutionary hypothesis proposed by Mueller & Bitner (2015) is that during the initial phases of ovoviviparity, the more rapidly developing genotypes could not begin development at the peak of octanoic acid concentration despite requiring degradation. This can be due to its tolerance only slightly increasing relative to the other slower developing genotypes. The rapid developing genotypes thus only had a short time to grow on the Morinda fruit before the arrival of other strong larval competitors.

This adaptation to the fresh Morinda fruit would require toleration to the toxins and would make the D. sechellia larvae develop quickly after the eggs were deposited. Its ovoviviparity would ensure that eggs hatch almost immediately in the chosen environment, like a fresh Morinda fruit, and virtually be competitor free until the fruit becomes rotten. The tolerance is a consequence of the changing biotic community in the Morinda fruit as it decays, and expects that such a mutation would accelerate the process of adaptation.

== See also ==
- Drosophila simulans
- Drosophila melanogaster
- Evolutionary adaptation
