= Drosophila elegans =

Scientific classification
- Kingdom: Animalia
- Phylum: Arthropoda
- Clade: Pancrustacea
- Class: Insecta
- Order: Diptera
- Family: Drosophilidae
- Genus: Drosophila
- Subgenus: Sophophora
- Species group: melanogaster
- Species subgroup: elegans
- Species: D. elegans

Binomial name
- Drosophila elegans Bock and Wheeler, 1972

Synonyms
- Drosophila (Sophophora) elegans

Species of fly

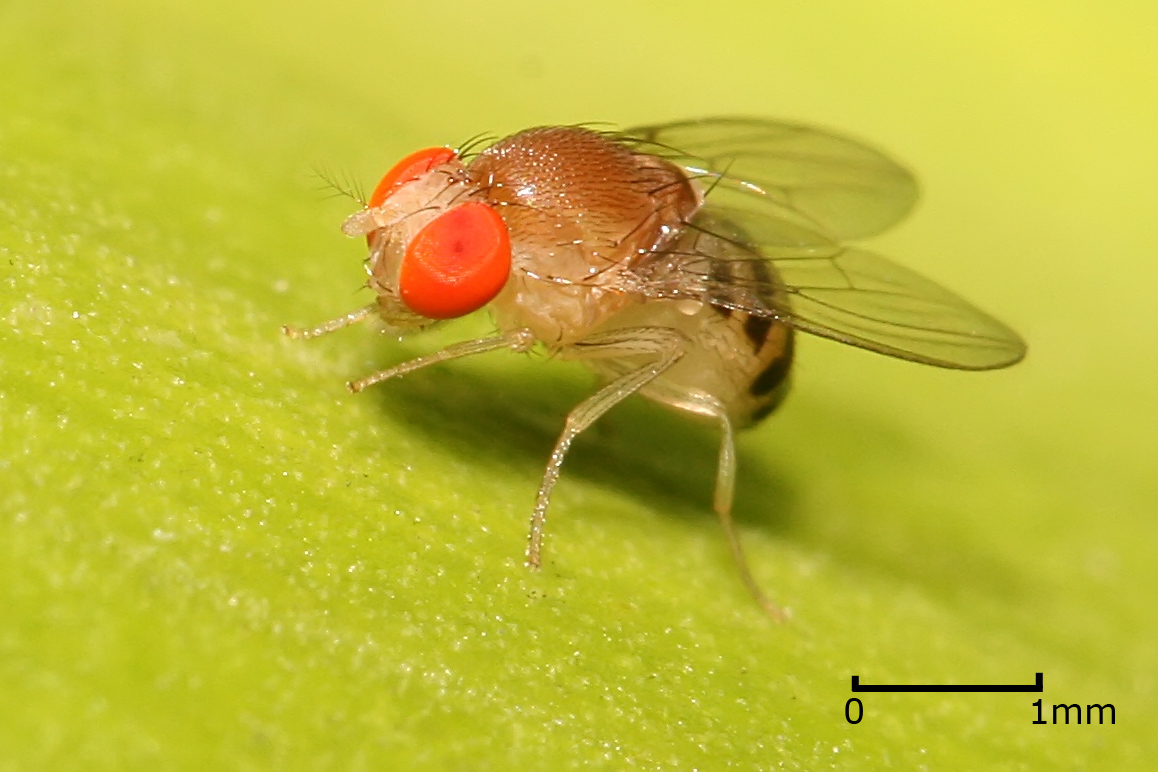
Drosophila

Drosophila elegans is a flower-feeding species of fruit flies, belonging to the family Drosophilidae. It is found in Taiwan and the Philippines in Asia.

It belongs to the Drosophila melanogaster species group where it forms its own subgroup. There are two morphs (brown and black) of the species. The difference is due to the percentages of 7-pentacosene and 9-pentacosene on the cuticle.

As a lab model species, it requires banana-opuntia-protein food. Its genome has been sequenced in 2011.

The name was also used for a fossil (†Drosophila elegans Statz, 1940) from the Upper Oligocene of the Rott Formation in Germany. The International Commission on Zoological Nomenclature ruled for the name to be conserved for the extant species by suppression of its unused senior homonym (replaced by †Drosophila statzi Ashburner and Bachli, 2006).

Genomic information
- NCBI ID: 30023
- Genome size: 171.268 Mb
- Year of completion: 2011

== See also ==
- List of Drosophila species
- List of sequenced animal genomes
