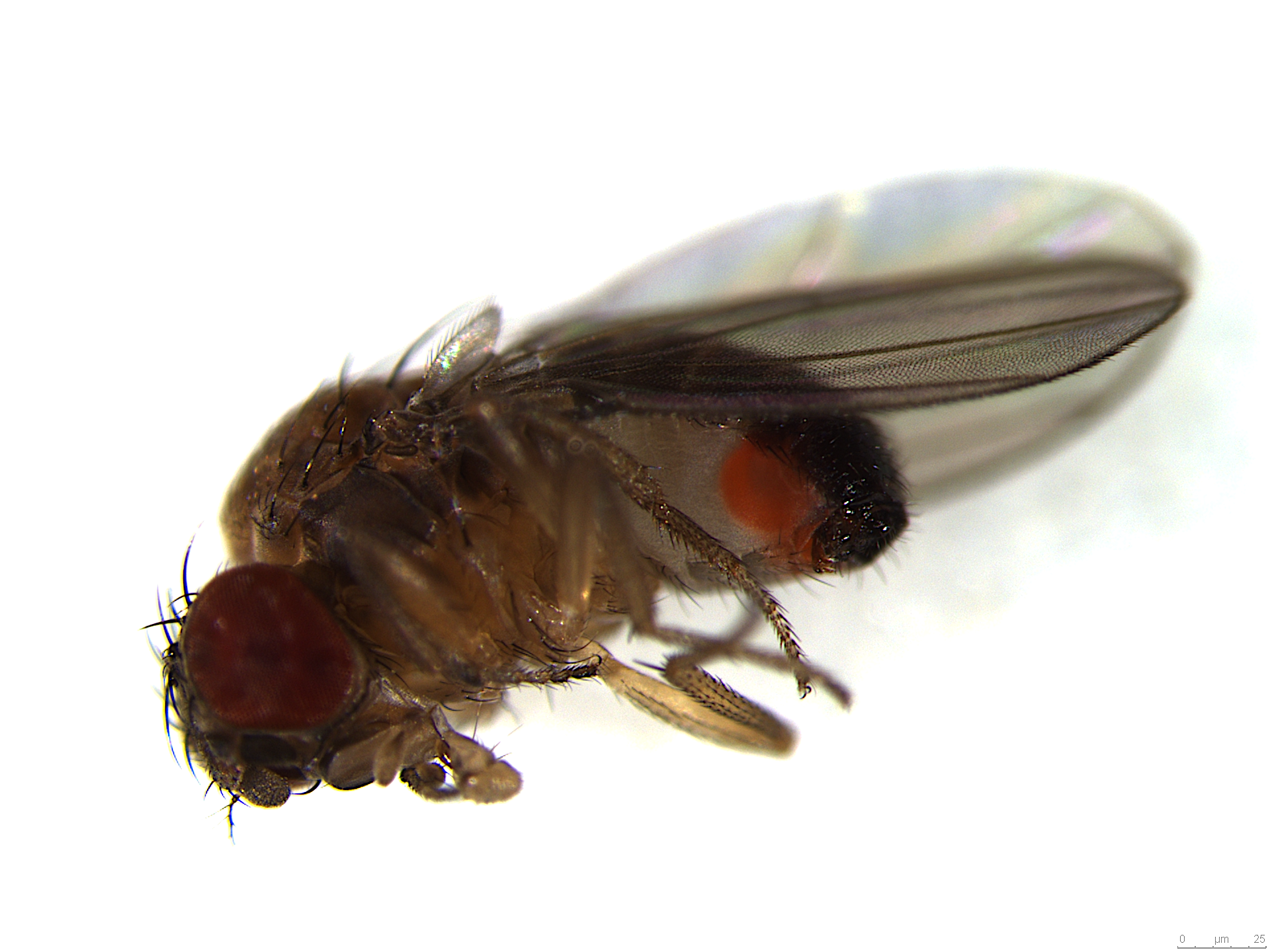
- A Drosophila affinis male showing its red-orange testes

Scientific classification
- Kingdom: Animalia
- Phylum: Arthropoda
- Class: Insecta
- Order: Diptera
- Family: Drosophilidae
- Genus: Drosophila
- Subgenus: Sophophora
- Species group: Drosophila obscura species group
- Species: D. affinis

Binomial name
- Drosophila affinis Sturtevant, 1916

= Drosophila affinis =

Species of fly

Drosophila affinis is a species of vinegar fly in the Drosophila obscura species group. Alongside other Obscura group species (e.g. Drosophila pseudoobscura), Drosophila affinis is used to study chromosome evolution and speciation.

== Gallery ==
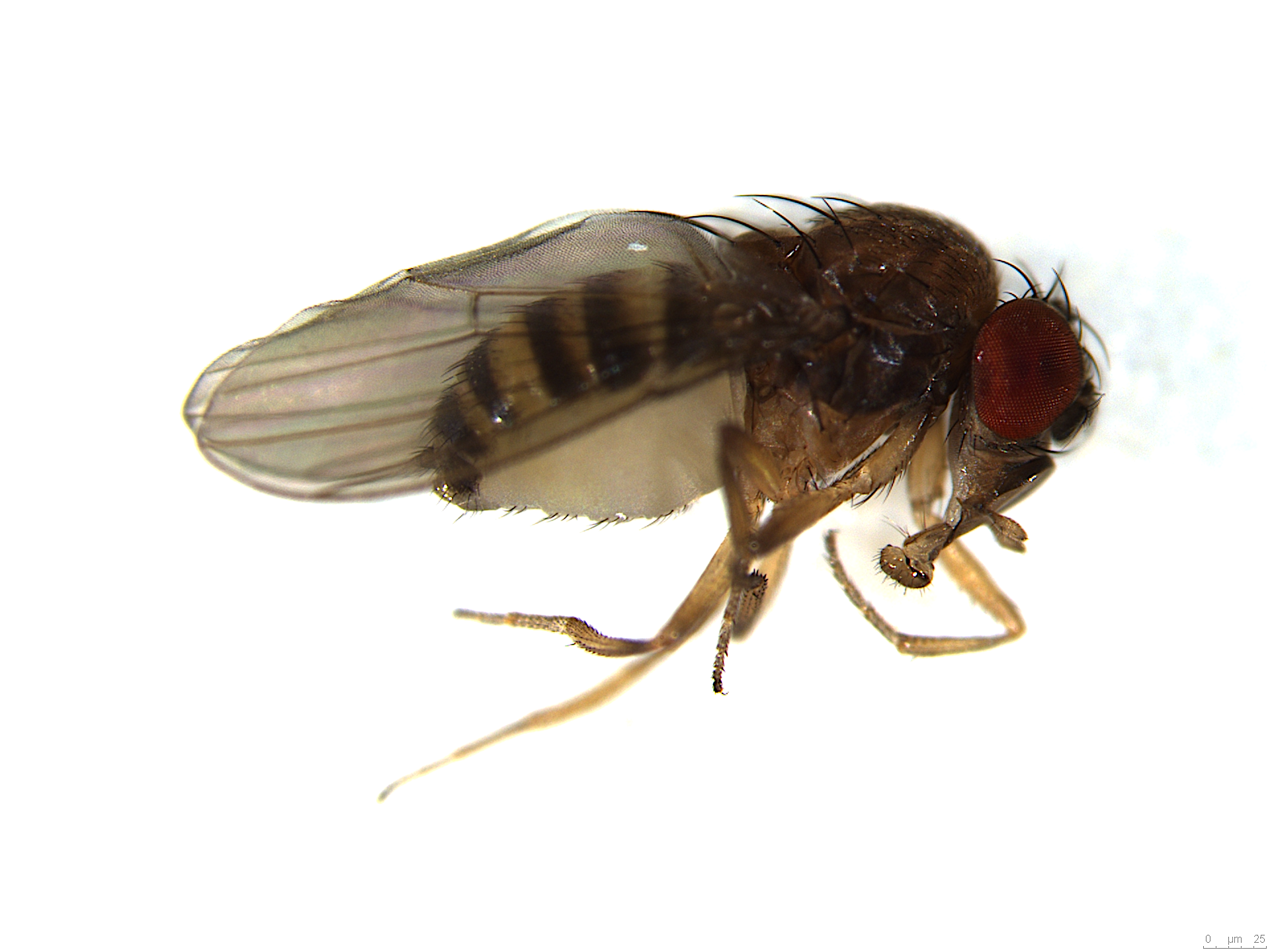
Drosophila affinis female
