= Drosophila persimilis =

Scientific classification
- Kingdom: Animalia
- Phylum: Arthropoda
- Class: Insecta
- Order: Diptera
- Family: Drosophilidae
- Genus: Drosophila
- Subgenus: Sophophora
- Species group: Drosophila obscura species group
- Species: D. persimilis

Binomial name
- Drosophila persimilis Dobzhansky and Epling, 1944

Species of fly

Drosophila persimilis is a species of fruit fly that is a sister species to D. pseudoobscura, and was one of 12 fruitfly genomes sequenced for a large comparative study.
