= Drosophila saltans species group =

Scientific classification
- Kingdom: Animalia
- Phylum: Arthropoda
- Class: Insecta
- Order: Diptera
- Family: Drosophilidae
- Genus: Drosophila
- Subgenus: Sophophora
- Species group: saltans

Group of flies

The Drosophila saltans species group contains 21 described fly species, all of which are found in the neotropical region. It is one of the seven species groups in the subgenus Sophophora, the others being the D. willistoni, D. melanogaster, D. obscura, D. dispar, D. fima, and D. dentissima groups. The D. saltans species group is most closely related to the D. willistoni subgroup. The species are placed into five subgroups: the D. s. cordata, D. s. elliptica, D. s. parasaltans, D. s. saltans, and D. s. sturtevanti subgroups. It is thought that, like the D. willistoni species group, the D. saltans species group originated in tropical North America, colonized South America, and then diversified prior to the formation of the Isthmus of Panama. Some of these may have migrated back to North America within the last 4.5 million years ago (mya), and consequently the relationship between the species is unresolved due to the short amount of time that has elapsed since their divergence points.

== Species ==
- D. s. cordata subgroup
  - Drosophila neocordata
- D. s. elliptica subgroup
  - Drosophila emarginata
  - Drosophila neoelliptica
- D. s. parasaltans subgroup
  - Drosophila subsaltans
- D. s. saltans subgroup
  - Drosophila austrosaltans
  - Drosophila lusaltans
  - Drosophila prosaltans
  - Drosophila saltans
- D. s. sturtevanti subgroup
  - Drosophila milleri
  - Drosophila sturtevanti
