= Drosophila yakuba =

Scientific classification
- Kingdom: Animalia
- Phylum: Arthropoda
- Clade: Pancrustacea
- Class: Insecta
- Order: Diptera
- Family: Drosophilidae
- Genus: Drosophila
- Subgenus: Sophophora
- Species group: melanogaster
- Species subgroup: melanogaster
- Species complex: yakuba
- Species: D. yakuba

Binomial name
- Drosophila yakuba Burla, 1954

Species of fly

Drosophila yakuba is an African species of fruit fly that is predominantly found in open savanna, and was one of 12 fruit fly genomes sequenced for a large comparative study.
