= Drosophila mauritiana =

Scientific classification
- Kingdom: Animalia
- Phylum: Arthropoda
- Clade: Pancrustacea
- Class: Insecta
- Order: Diptera
- Family: Drosophilidae
- Genus: Drosophila
- Subgenus: Sophophora
- Species group: melanogaster
- Species subgroup: melanogaster
- Species complex: simulans
- Species: D. mauritiana

Binomial name
- Drosophila mauritiana Tsacas & David, 1974

Synonyms
- Drosophila (Sophophora) mauritiana

Species of fly

Drosophila mauritiana is a species of fly, belonging to the family Drosophilidae. It belongs to the Drosophila melanogaster species subgroup. It is found in Mauritius.

The Mariner transposon Mos1 (for Mosaic element) was discovered in Drosophila mauritiana.

== See also ==
- List of Drosophila species
