= Drosophila erecta =

Scientific classification
- Kingdom: Animalia
- Phylum: Arthropoda
- Clade: Pancrustacea
- Class: Insecta
- Order: Diptera
- Family: Drosophilidae
- Genus: Drosophila
- Subgenus: Sophophora
- Species group: melanogaster
- Species subgroup: melanogaster
- Species complex: erecta
- Species: D. erecta

Binomial name
- Drosophila erecta Tsacas and Lachaise, 1974

Species of fly

Drosophila erecta is a West African species of fruit fly, and was one of 12 fruit fly genomes sequenced for a large comparative study.
