= Drosophila helvetica =

Scientific classification
- Kingdom: Animalia
- Phylum: Arthropoda
- Clade: Pancrustacea
- Class: Insecta
- Order: Diptera
- Family: Drosophilidae
- Genus: Drosophila
- Subgenus: Sophophora
- Species group: Drosophila obscura species group
- Species: D. helvetica

Binomial name
- Drosophila helvetica Burla, 1948

Species of fly

Drosophila helvetica is a rare European species of fruit fly from the family Drosophilidae. It seems to be associated with humid woodland habitat, and sometimes found near farms.
