= Drosophila melanogaster species subgroup =

Scientific classification
- Kingdom: Animalia
- Phylum: Arthropoda
- Clade: Pancrustacea
- Class: Insecta
- Order: Diptera
- Family: Drosophilidae
- Genus: Drosophila
- Subgenus: Sophophora
- Species group: melanogaster
- Species subgroup: melanogaster

Group of flies

The Drosophila melanogaster species subgroup contains 9 species of flies, including the best known species Drosophila melanogaster and D. simulans. The subgroup belongs to the Drosophila melanogaster species group within the subgenus Sophophora.

Males can discriminate between females of different species, in part, by detecting differences in the hydrocarbon pheromones coating their bodies. Females can discriminate between males of different species, in part, by detecting species-specific differences in the male's courtship behavior. When copulation does occur between different species, the hybrid progeny are often non-viable, sterile or fertile with lower fitness.

== Phylogeny ==
- - - D. (S.) melanogaster
    - - D. (S.) simulans
      - D. (S.) mauritiana
      - D. (S.) sechellia
  - - - - D. (S.) yakuba
        - D. (S.) santomea
      - D. (S.) teissieri
    - - D. (S.) orena
      - D. (S.) erecta

The phylogeny of the melanogaster complex

- D. (S.) melanogaster Meigen, 1830

simulans complex

- D. (S.) simulans Sturtevant, 1919
- D. (S.) mauritiana Tsacas and David, 1974
- D. (S.) sechellia Tsacas and Bächli, 1981

yakuba complex

- D. (S.) yakuba Burla, 1954
- D. (S.) santomea
- D. (S.) teissieri Tsacas, 1971

erecta complex

- D. (S.) erecta Tsacas and Lachaise, 1974
- D. (S.) orena Tsacas and David, 1978

The species of the simulans complex form a hard polytomy. Most likely, the island species D. (S.) mauritiana (Mauritius) and D. (S.) sechellia (Seychelles) branched off from the mainland species D. (S.) simulans in such a narrow time frame that it is impossible to distinguish which species branched off first and which second.
