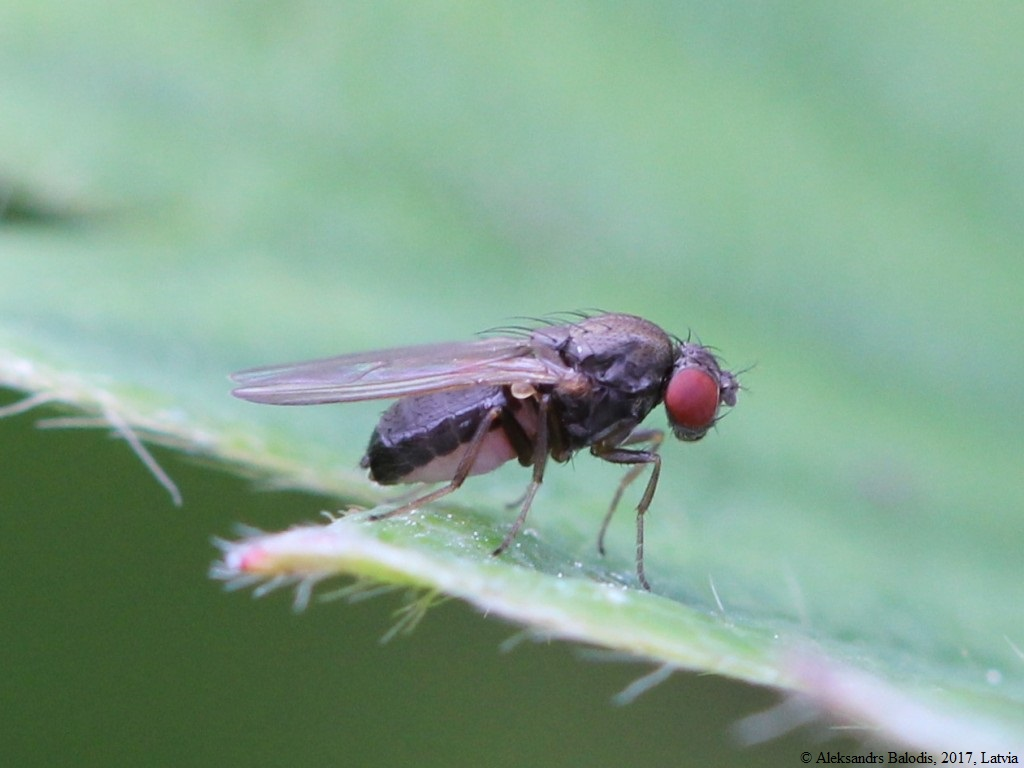

Scientific classification
- Kingdom: Animalia
- Phylum: Arthropoda
- Clade: Pancrustacea
- Class: Insecta
- Order: Diptera
- Family: Drosophilidae
- Genus: Drosophila
- Subgenus: Sophophora
- Species group: Drosophila obscura species group
- Species: D. obscura

Binomial name
- Drosophila obscura Fallén, 1823

Synonyms
- Drosophila obscuroides Pomini, 1940

= Drosophila obscura =

Species of fly

Drosophila obscura is a very abundant European species of fruit fly from the family Drosophilidae. It has been found in most habitat types with exception of coastal areas and open heathland. Larvae can be found in the sap runs of a number of deciduous trees.
