= Drosophila elegans species subgroup =

Scientific classification
- Kingdom: Animalia
- Phylum: Arthropoda
- Class: Insecta
- Order: Diptera
- Family: Drosophilidae
- Genus: Drosophila
- Subgenus: Sophophora
- Species group: melanogaster
- Species subgroup: elegans

Group of flies

The Drosophila elegans species subgroup contains 3 species. The subgroup belongs to the Drosophila melanogaster species group within the subgenus Sophophora.

== Phylogeny ==
- - D. (S.) elegans
  - D. (S.) gunungcola
  - D. (S.) subelegans

melanogaster complex, elegans subgroup:

- D. (S.) elegans
- D. (S.) gunungcola
- D. (S.) subelegans
