= Drosophila subsilvestris =

Scientific classification
- Kingdom: Animalia
- Phylum: Arthropoda
- Clade: Pancrustacea
- Class: Insecta
- Order: Diptera
- Family: Drosophilidae
- Genus: Drosophila
- Subgenus: Sophophora
- Species group: Drosophila obscura species group
- Species: D. subsilvestris

Binomial name
- Drosophila subsilvestris Hardy & Kaneshiro, 1968

Synonyms
- Drosophila silvestris Basden, 1954

Species of fly

Drosophila subsilvestris is a relatively common Northern European species of fruit flies from the family Drosophilidae. It is associated with woodland. It is in flight from April to November, being most abundant in June and July, and in September and October.
