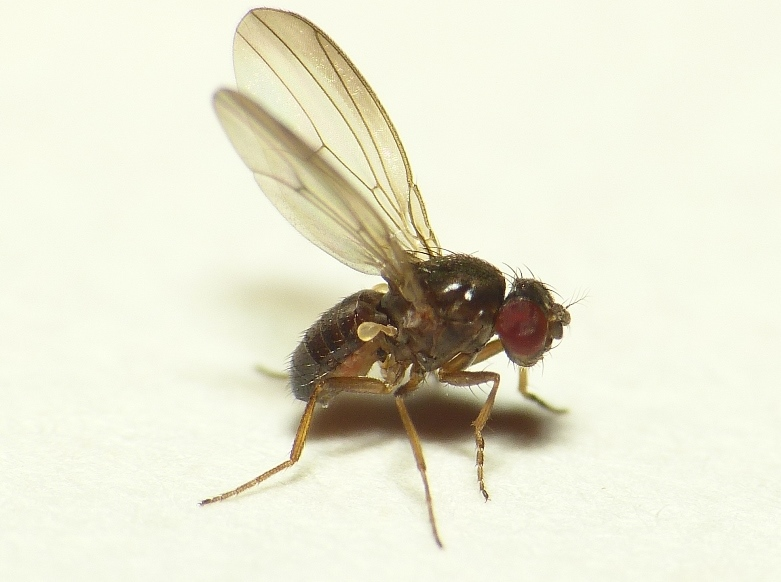
- Drosophila tristis Netherlands

Scientific classification
- Kingdom: Animalia
- Phylum: Arthropoda
- Clade: Pancrustacea
- Class: Insecta
- Order: Diptera
- Family: Drosophilidae
- Genus: Drosophila
- Subgenus: Sophophora
- Species group: Drosophila obscura species group
- Species: D. tristis

Binomial name
- Drosophila tristis Fallén, 1823

= Drosophila tristis =

Species of fly

Drosophila tristis is a relatively uncommon European species of fruit flies from the family Drosophilidae. It is associated with deciduous woodland. Adults have been observed feeding on tree sap runs. Adults are in flight from April to November, being most abundant in June to August.
