= Drosophila ambigua =

Scientific classification
- Kingdom: Animalia
- Phylum: Arthropoda
- Class: Insecta
- Order: Diptera
- Family: Drosophilidae
- Genus: Drosophila
- Subgenus: Sophophora
- Species group: Drosophila obscura species group
- Species: D. ambigua

Binomial name
- Drosophila ambigua Pomini, 1940

Species of fly

Drosophila ambigua is a European species of fruit fly.

It is known from most European countries, but it is not common in any of them. It is found wild in Spain, but in other countries it is only found in association with the activities of man, being found on farms, public houses, orchards, fruit stores and the like. There is speculation that it does not over winter in most of Northern Europe, but is reintroduced anew each year.
