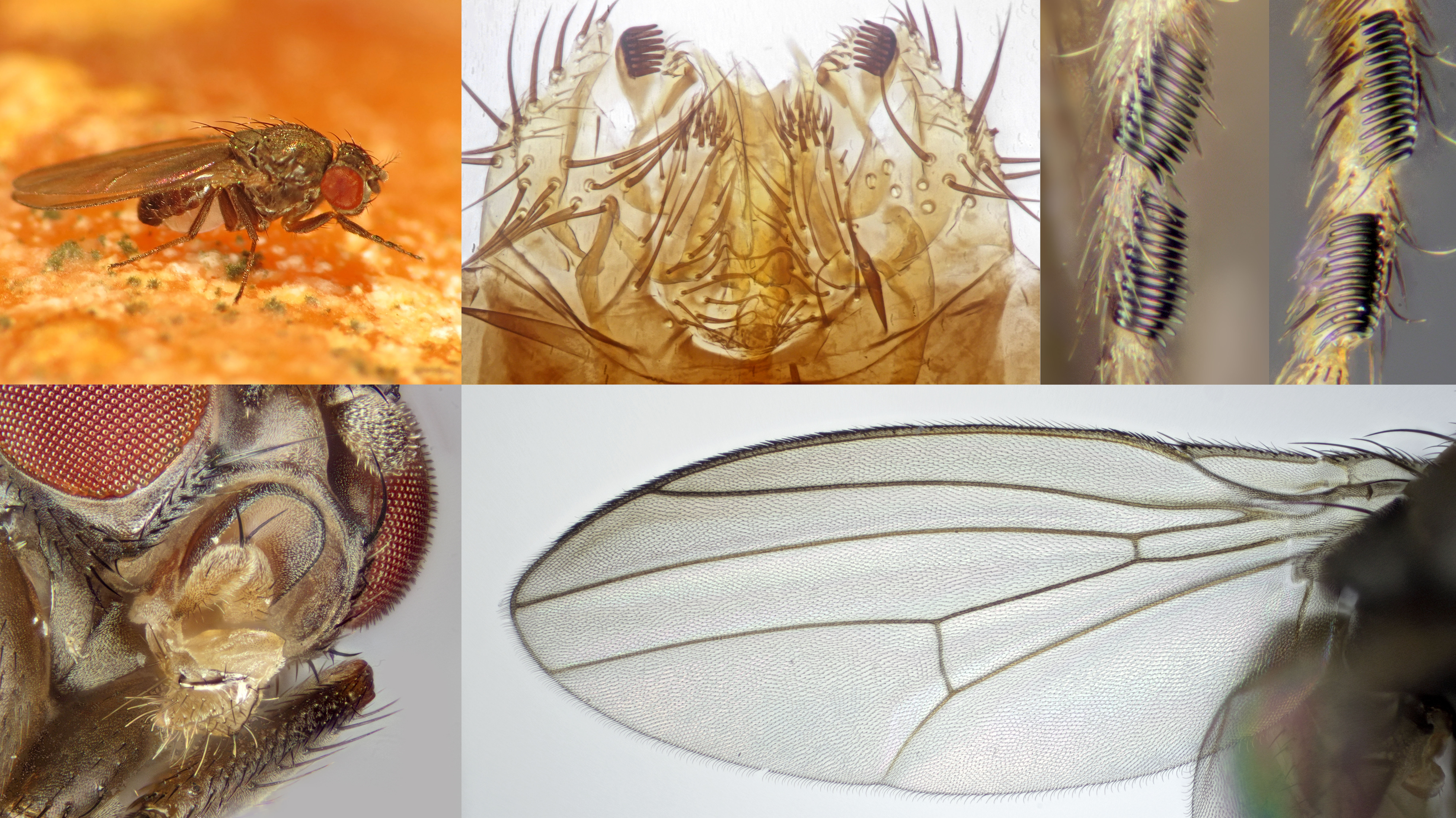
- Five anatomical images of a Drosophila subobscura (male) on a rotting squash, located near Christchurch Park, Ipswich

Scientific classification
- Kingdom: Animalia
- Phylum: Arthropoda
- Clade: Pancrustacea
- Class: Insecta
- Order: Diptera
- Family: Drosophilidae
- Genus: Drosophila
- Subgenus: Sophophora
- Species group: Drosophila obscura species group
- Species: D. subobscura

Binomial name
- Drosophila subobscura Collin, 1936

= Drosophila subobscura =

Species of insect (fruit fly)

Drosophila subobscura is a species of fruit fly in the family Drosophilidae. It is native to Europe, North Africa and the Middle East. It has been introduced into the west coasts of Canada, the United States, and Chile. Its closest relative is Drosophila madeirensis, found in the Madeira Islands, followed by D. guanche, found in the Canary Islands. These three species form the D. subobscura species subgroup. When they mate, males and females perform an elaborate courtship dance, in which the female can either turn away to end the mating ritual, or stick out her proboscis in response to the male's, allowing copulation to proceed. D. subobscura has been regarded as a model organism for its use in evolutionary-biological studies.

== Description ==
Both wild type and laboratory-reared individuals of D. subobscura are brown, with clear wings, yellow halters, yellowish legs, and red eyes. They do not exhibit sexual size dimorphism; the males and females are about 2 mm (0.08 in) long. The males have a brown antenna, grey pollinose, and brown dorsal surface of the thorax. The tergum (dorsal area excluding the head) is dark brown. On the fore legs, the first tarsal segment contains the proximal comb, which has 7-12 teeth. The second segment contains the distal comb, which has 10-13 teeth. The females share the same characteristics as the males, except in respect to tarsal combs. The eggs are smaller than those of the closely related D. obscura, and their two filaments are about half the length of the egg. Its larvae and pupa are of the usual drosophilid type.

=== Head ===
The arista (bristles arising from the antennae) of D. subobscura contain 6-8 branches, with 1-2 of those branches below the terminal fork. The species has a brown antenna with grey pollinosity that is approximately the same color as the rest of the head-capsule. The front (frons) is dark brown and matte, without any pollinosity except on the frontal triangle and fronto-orbital plates, both of which are shiny and slightly pollinose. The carina of the fly is rounded, widening below, and the face is a paler brown color with grey pollinosoty. The genae is brown with heavy, grey pollinosity. The ocelli (small or 'simple' eyes of an insect) are the same color as the eyes.

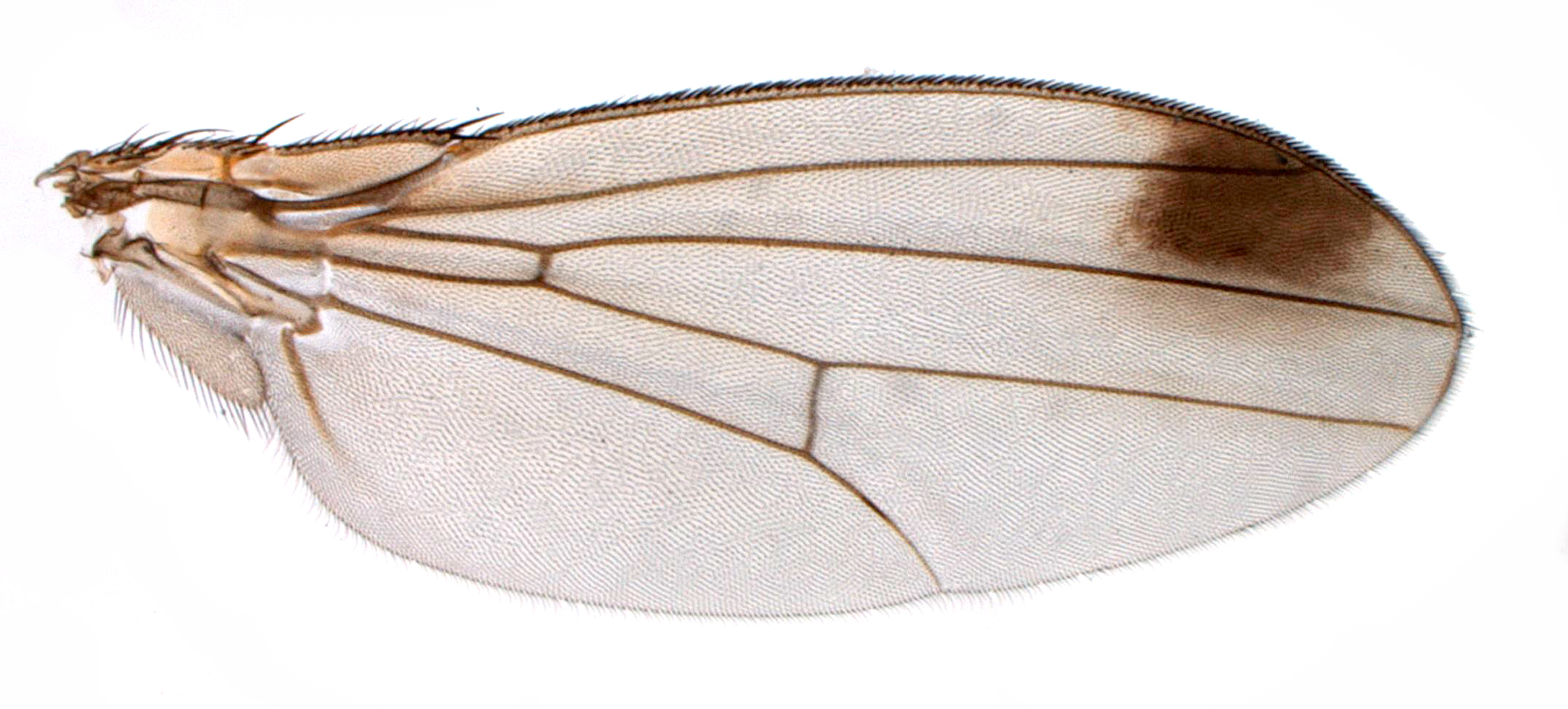
Close-up view of the intricate wing venation seen in a species of Drosophila

=== Body ===
The dorsa of the thorax is brown with grey pollinose. There appear to be no traces of any longitudinal stripes or lines upon it. The wings are colorless.

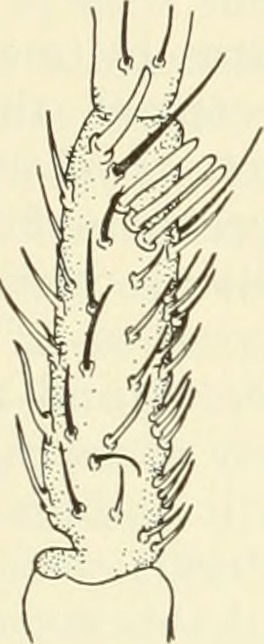
A journal sketch of the bristles seen on the first tarsal joint of a species of Drosophila

The legs of D. subobscura are a yellowish color. The combs of the teeth are each aligned on the longitudinal axis of the first and second tarsal segments of the fore legs. The proximal comb, identified as the comb of the first segment, has 7-12 teeth and is about half as long as the segment itself. The distal comb, on the second segment, is longer than half the length of that segment. The first tarsal segment is slightly longer than both the second and third segments, but shorter than their combined length. The abdomen has tergites that are uniformly dark brown, but shiny in some lights. Other lights reveal a grey pollinosity appearance.

=== Bristles ===
The upper reclinate fronto-orbital bristles are long, the middle reclinate bristles are short, and the lower proclinate bristles are medium in length. Proportionally, the listed bristles lengths can be characterized in a 4:2:3 fashion. The ocellar, post-vertical, and inner and outer vertical bristles are all about the same length as the upper reclinate fronto-orbital bristles. The bristle behind the vibrissa is less than half the length of the upper reclinate fronto-orbital bristles. The species also has two pairs of dorso-central bristles and 8-10 rows of acrostichal hairs. No acrostichal bristles are seen to have developed in the species. The anterior scutella bristles are parallel to each other. The anterior sternopleural bristles are shorter than the posterior ones. The wings have costal bristles. The pre-apical tibial and apical tibial bristles of the legs are not exceptionally long.

=== Distinction from other species of Drosophila ===
D. subobscura are found to be unusual among the Drosophila genus, because they are monandrous (females mate with only one male). Additionally, unlike the rest of the Drosophila genus, D. subobscura do not mate in the absence of light nor do they produce courtship songs by wing vibration. A study published in 2017 revealed that the difference in courtship behavior between D. subobscura and D. melanogaster (in particular, the D. subobscura's nuptial gift transfer behavior) may be related to a fruitless-labelled neural circuit that differs slightly between the two flies; its optogenetic activation in D. subobscura males induces mating acts, including the regurgitation used in the nuptial gift.

== Taxonomy ==
In 1933, A. H. Sturtevant captured a species of Drosophila in England. When Sturtevant submitted the captured specimens to J. E. Collin of Newmarket, Collin identified the species as D. subobscura, a manuscript name. Three years later, the first description of D. subobscura appeared in an addendum to Gordon's paper through a short note written by Collin. In the note, Collin compared both sexes of D. subobscura and differentiated them as a separate species from D. obscura, their nearest related species. Collin's description, considered incomplete but necessary to validate the D. subobscura name, was followed up with a more complete description by Dr. John Smart.

In 1942, A. H. Sturtevant founded the obscura group, which initially consisted of the affinis and obscura species groups. The obscura group falls under the subgenus Sophophora. The obscura species group currently contains 6 subgroups, listed alphabetically: affinis, microlabis, obscura, pseudoobscura, subobscura, and sinobscura. D. subobscura belongs to the subobscura subgroup, along with the closely related Drosophila guanche and Drosophila madeirensis.

In experimental trials, D. subobscura does not breed with any other species of obscura, except D. madeirensis, a species also in the subobscura subgroup. When crossed, sterile males and fertile female hybrids are formed. As of March 2019, the first long-read sequencing of D. subobscura's genome has been presented, showing that evolution of its genome structure is indirectly driven by the effects of suppressing recombination of genetic inversions. This suppressive effect maintains various sets of adaptive alleles together in the midst of gene flow.

When Collin identified Sturtevant's captured species as D. subobscura in 1933, the name was coined as a manuscript name. The species was then bred at the Department of Biometry in University College in London to be genetically experimented on. Here, one paper that resulted from this experimental work in London referred to the tested species as Collin's coined manuscript name, D. subobscura, and was referred to as such moving forward. During this time, involved parties knew that D. subobscura was simply a manuscript name, thus creating anticipation that Collin would publish a description of the species and consequently validate the name. Although Collin did not publish the anticipated description of the species, in 1936, he contributed a note in the addendum of a paper published by Gordon that same year. The note outlines a diagnosis of the sexes and differentiation of the species from D. obscura and attributes the D. subobscura name to Collin. Thus, the name “D. subobscura Collin” dates from 1936, because none of the papers that come before it include a description of the given species that would have satisfied nomenclature rules. Therefore, prior to the addendum in Gordon's paper in 1936, the D. subobscura name used in published works must be regarded as a manuscript name. In 1938, two years after Gordon's paper, Dr. Eugène Séguy had described a new species of Drosophila in Kenya, naming it D. subobscura. Though this D. subobscura was recorded in the 1938 Zoological Record, the “D. subobscura Collin” name had not appeared in the Zoological Record as a new species as of 1945.

== Distribution ==
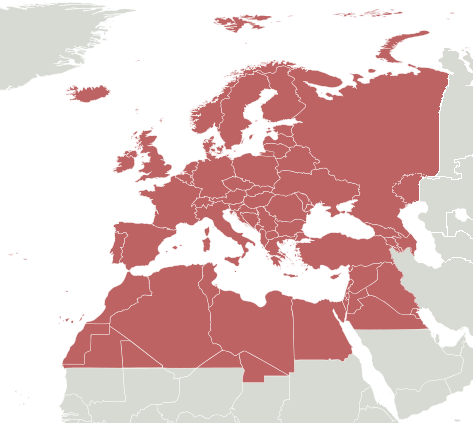
D. subobscura native distribution

D. subobscura is widely distributed in Europe, from southern Scandinavia south to the Mediterranean, and in North Africa and the Middle East as far east as Iran. Its distribution spans over thirty latitudinal degrees, with its most dense populations residing in the western Palaeartic realm. Introduced populations of D. subobscura are found in the west coasts of Canada, the United States, and Chile.

D. subobscura was first discovered in the Americas (southern Chile) in February 1978. D. subobscura was later found in La Serena, Chile, in the summer of 1979; Punta Arenas, Chile, in January 1981; San Carlos de Bariloche, Argentina, in November 1981; and then Mar del Plata, Argentina, in 1984. In 1982, D. subobscura was discovered in North America in the city of Port Townsend, Washington, followed by the surrounding northern and southern areas, from Vancouver B.C. to Oregon. In fall 1983, D. subobscura was found in the Central Valley, Davis, and El Rio Vineyard areas of California.

The colonization of western North America by D. subobscura is probably a fairly recent event. The origin of the North and South America colonizers remains unknown, but evidence reveals that they derive from the same Palearctic population.

== Habitat ==
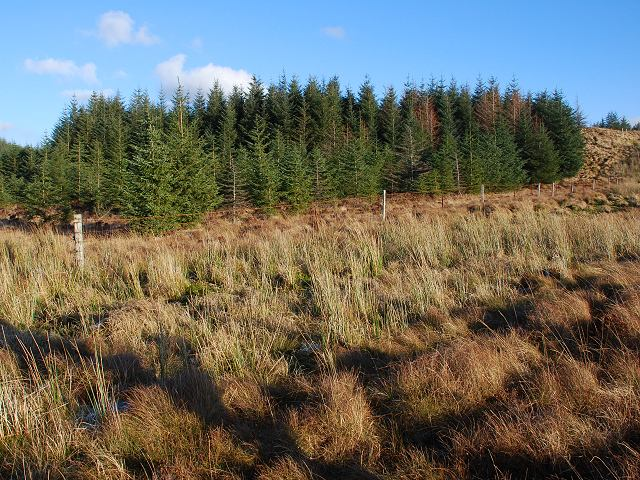
D. subobscura can be found in forest fringes and open fields

D. subobscura is mainly found in open fields or forest fringes. Decreases in light and temperature induce locomotion activity in D. subobscura towards areas outside of the forest. The genome of some Greek populations of D. subobscura has shown evidence of microgeographic variation, prompting a possibility that the species exhibits habitat choice.

However, no evidence has been found to show that D. subobscura exhibits individual habitat choice, aligning with the fact that its well-studied inversion polymorphism is relatively inflexible and slow to respond to the environment. Additionally, individuals do not exhibit much preference for different times of the day; even then, there remains some evidence to suggest that the species displays feeding and breeding site fidelity, as individuals were shown to return to familiar baits.

== Mating ==
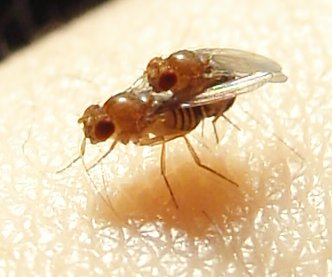
A species of Drosophila mating via male mounting onto the female from behind

D. subobscura is monandrous, a behavior not usually seen among Drosophila. Visual stimuli dictate courtship behavior. D. subobscura do not mate in the dark and do not produce a courtship song via wing vibrations like other species of Dipterans. Instead, the lone male repeatedly “scissors” its wings, an activity augmented in the presence of other flies. This behavior indicates that the male is looking to court a female. When a female appears, the male taps her with his own front legs. The male then stands in front and directly faces the female to stick out his proboscis. The male and female then start to “dance”, as the female rapidly sidesteps, while the male tries to keep himself directly facing the female. During the dance, the male's wings are usually raised and extended. Sometimes, mounting can occur without a dance taking place prior. At this point, the female has two options: she can either end the dance, without mating, by turning away from the male and leaving, or she can stand still, extend her own proboscis, and invite the male to mount her by parting her wings. In the latter behavior, the male stretches its wings sideways and swings behind the female to mount her. The male and female probosces may or may not touch beforehand. Additionally, unique to just D. subobscura among the other species in its species group, males will attempt to mate with wax models, only if the wax is moved rapidly from side to side. If wax models did not carry out the dance, then ultimately the males did not attempt copulation.

Although males always extend their own proboscis, this activity within the female varies greatly. Activities among three consecutive male-female courtships showed three different female behaviors: 1) no protrusion of the proboscis, 2) continued extension of the proboscis for several seconds after mounting had occurred, and 3) repeated protrusion and withdrawal of the proboscis before the male mounted. The tips of the male and female probosces can occasionally be observed to be brought into contact, where they alternate with back and forth motions.

=== Sexual selection ===
D. subobscura practice nuptial feeding, a practice where a nutritional gift is transferred from one partner to another during/directly after courtship and/or copulation. In the case of D. subobscura, the gift is a regurgitated drop of liquid secreted from the male's crop, onto the female's proboscis. Preventing production and exchange of nutritional gifts among D. subobscura has been shown to decrease both male mating success and egg count among females.

It has been shown that males that are in good condition produce more nutritional gifts, thereby increasing their mating success. Additionally, starved females show preference for well-fed males as a way to increase the female's fecundity – this preference is speculated to be the case due to the greater quantity of drops that well-fed males produce. If larger males, carrying bigger nutritional gifts, are prevented from producing their gifts, then small males are more successful in female courtship, due to better tracking of the female during the courtship dance. Larger males are seen to have slower acceleration and deceleration speeds.

=== Inbred male behavior ===
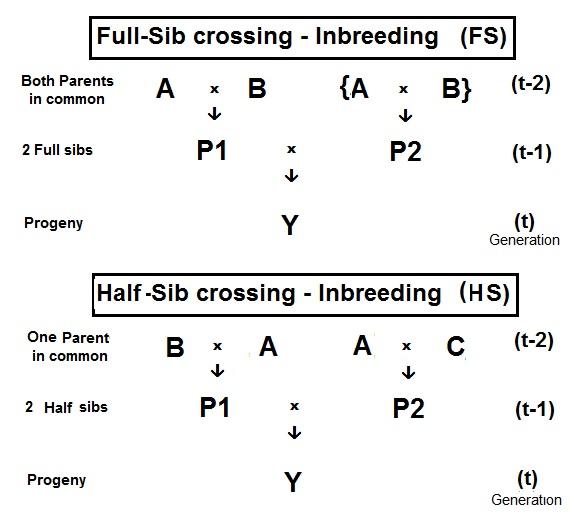
An allelic diagram of inbreeding and its relationship to ancestral genetic similarity

Reported observations of mating behavior in inbred males reveal that in most cases, active courtships were seen, but mating did not normally follow. However, prolonged dances were rare. On two occasions, the male directly approaches the female, in which the female steps sideways several times in front of the stationary male, before ultimately turning away. More usually, the male attempts to follow the sidestep movements of the female but would often lag behind and struggle to consistently face the female. In the incident that the female stands still and extends her proboscis, the male usually would attempt to mount. More often than not, the inbred male would fall on his back, or land too far forward or too far back on the female. In the case of the latter, the female normally stands still with her wings partially extended before eventually kicking off the male. Inbred males who have continuously but unsuccessfully attempted to court a female may approach the female from the side or behind and attempt to directly mount, a behavior described by Maynard Smith as “desperation”. These mating attempts remain unsuccessful. The observed lower mating success in inbred males has been thought to be due to lower athletic ability via physiologically-efficient muscles, sense organs, and neuromuscular coordination, rather than lower intensity of courtship.

=== Influence of gut microbiota on mating behavior ===
A study has displayed that the condition of D. subobscura's gut microbiota can have an effect on its mating behavior. Upon suppressing the gut bacteria of female D. subobscura with antibiotics, researchers observed that these females mated faster with males that had intact microbiota. Females with intact gut bacteria were less willing to mate with males that had intact microbiota. Additionally, fecundity was seen to increase when the gut bacteria of male and female D. subobscura were suppressed through antibiotics, compared to no suppression.

== Genetics ==
Analysis of D. subobscura's salivary gland has shown that its genome mimics the Drosophila karyotype, consisting of a small dot and five large acrocentric rods. Additionally, the genome does not show a chromocenter and contains high levels of chromosomal polymorphisms caused by paracentric inversions on all of the acrocentric rods. Polytene drawings and photomaps helped further the study of these inversions, allowing for the finding of more than 600 different linkages and genetic markers, which encompass a majority of the euchromatic genome. More than 65 inversions have been identified.

D. subobscura is frequently used in evolutionary-biological studies. As D. subobscura, among others within its species group, has been reputed as a model organism for evolutionary-biological studies, its genetics and ecology have been scrutinized for more than forty years. These flies have served as favorable models ever since Theodosius Dobzhansky and his colleagues published their influential works in the 1930s. From the species' discovery in the Palearctic realm to its colonization of North and South America, it has attracted the interests of both European and American scientists as experimental material in evolution, biology, and ecology.

=== Significance in tracking climate change ===
The D. subobscura genome has been used to track global climate change by measuring the magnitude and direction of shifts in chromosome inversion frequencies in comparison to ambient temperatures at selected European, North American. and South American sites. Climates warmed at 22 of the 26 sites studied, and in 21 of those 22 populations of D. subobscura, genotypes seen in warm climates increased in frequency. It was shown that genetic changes in D. subobscura at these sites can be used as a possible tool to track global climate warming.
