= Hirtodrosophila duncani =

Scientific classification
- Kingdom: Animalia
- Phylum: Arthropoda
- Class: Insecta
- Order: Diptera
- Family: Drosophilidae
- Subtribe: Drosophilina
- Infratribe: Drosophiliti
- Genus: Hirtodrosophila
- Species: H. duncani

Binomial name
- Hirtodrosophila duncani (Sturtevant, 1918)

Synonyms
- Drosophila duncani Sturtevant, 1918

Species of fly

Hirtodrosophila duncani is a North American fruit fly, a member of the fungus-breeding genus Hirtodrosophila. Its taxonomic position has been unclear for a long time due to its unique male genitalia, but recent molecular studies indicate that it is closely related to the New World Sophophora.
