= Polytomy =

Multifurcated node of a phylogenetic tree

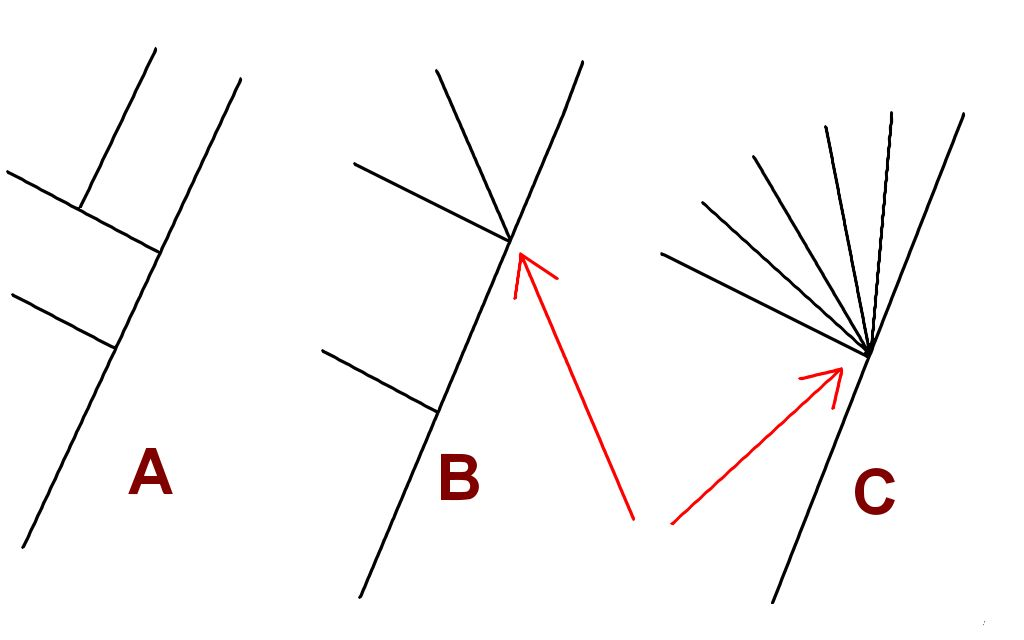
Cladograms B and C contain polytomies, where more than one branch descends from a single node.

An internal node of a phylogenetic tree is described as a polytomy or multifurcation if (i) it is in a rooted tree and is linked to three or more child subtrees or (ii) it is in an unrooted tree and is attached to four or more branches.

== Soft polytomies vs. hard polytomies ==
Two types of polytomies are recognized, soft and hard polytomies.

Soft polytomies are the result of insufficient phylogenetic information: though the lineages diverged at different times – meaning that some of these lineages are closer relatives than others, and the available data does not allow recognition of this. Most polytomies are soft, meaning that they would be resolved into a typical tree of dichotomies if better data were available.

In contrast, a hard polytomy represents a true divergence event of three or more lineages.

== Applications ==
Interpretations for a polytomy depend on the individuals that are represented in the phylogenetic tree.

=== Species polytomies ===
If the lineages in the phylogenetic tree stand for species, a polytomy shows the simultaneous speciation of three or more species. In particular situations, they may be common, for example when a species that has rapidly expanded its range or is highly panmictic undergoes peripatric speciation in different regions.

An example is the Drosophila simulans species complex. Here, the ancestor seems to have colonized two islands at the same time but independently, yielding two equally old but divergently evolved daughter species.

=== Molecular polytomies ===
If a phylogenetic tree is reconstructed from DNA sequence data of a particular gene, a hard polytomy arises when three or more sampled genes trace their ancestry to a single gene in an ancestral organism. In contrast, a soft polytomy stems from branches on gene trees of finite temporal duration but for which no substitutions have occurred.

== See also ==
- Cladistics
- Computational phylogenetics
- Phylogenetic comparative methods
- Phylogenetics
- Systematics
