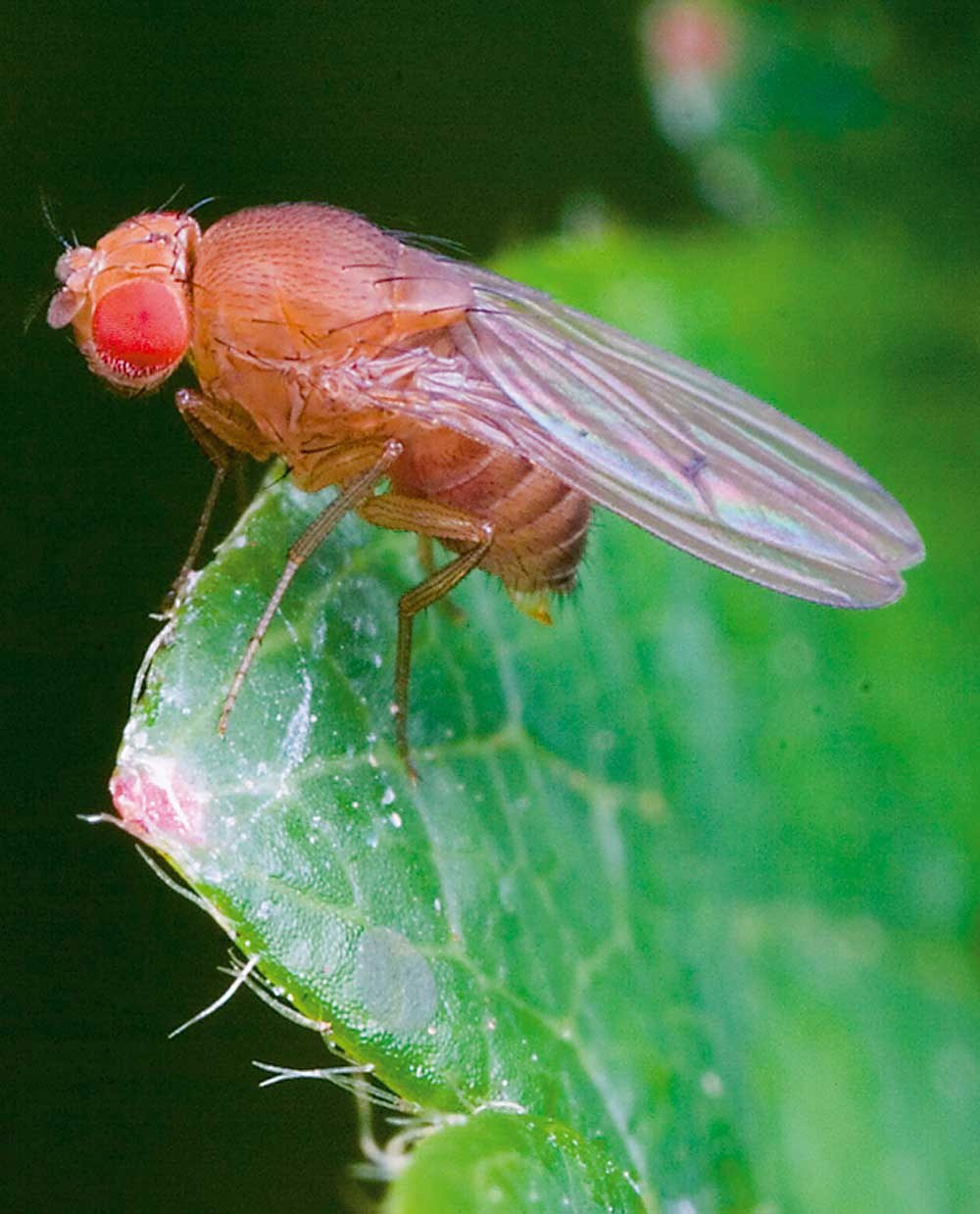
- Drosophila simulans adult female

Scientific classification
- Kingdom: Animalia
- Phylum: Arthropoda
- Clade: Pancrustacea
- Class: Insecta
- Order: Diptera
- Family: Drosophilidae
- Genus: Drosophila
- Subgenus: Sophophora
- Species group: melanogaster
- Species subgroup: melanogaster
- Species complex: simulans
- Species: D. simulans

Binomial name
- Drosophila simulans Sturtevant, 1919

= Drosophila simulans =

Species of fly

Drosophila simulans is a species of fly closely related to D. melanogaster, belonging to the same melanogaster species subgroup. Its closest relatives are D. mauritiana and D. sechellia.

== Taxonomy ==
This species was discovered by the fly geneticist Alfred Sturtevant in 1919, when he noticed that the flies used in Thomas Hunt Morgan's laboratory at the Columbia University were actually two distinct species: D. melanogaster and D. simulans. Males differ in the external genitalia, while trained observers can separate females using colour characteristics. D. melanogaster females crossed to D. simulans males produce sterile F1 females and no F1 males. The reciprocal cross produces sterile F1 males and no female progeny.

Drosophila simulans was found later to be closely related to two island endemics, D. sechellia and D. mauritiana. D. simulans will mate with these sister species to form fertile females and sterile males, a fact that has made D. simulans an important model organism for research into speciation. D. simulans are monomorphic in their pheromone profiles where both males and females largely produce the cuticular hydrocarbon pheromone 7-tricosene (7-T). The ability of males within the D. melanogaster subgroup to discriminate between conspecific and heterospecific females is due in part to the differential valence of the cuticular hydrocarbon 7,11-heptacosadiene (7,11-HD), which is produced by D. melanogaster and D. sechellia females. Perfuming a D. simulans female with 7,11-HD is sufficient to suppress D. simulans male courtship.

Studies have provided evidence that paternal leakage is an integral part of the inheritance of this species.

Wolbachia infections give insight into how certain species of Drosophila are related. Through the analysis of cytoplasmic incompatibility and similar mitochondrial DNA, it has been shown that D. simulans and D. mauritiana are more closely related to each other than to D. sechellia. Cytoplasmic incompatibility causes egg and sperm cells to fail in creating viable offspring, a common feature in Wolbachia-infected D. simulans and D. mauritiana individuals. Drosophila sechellia has significantly distinct mitochondrial DNA, further emphasizing the evolutionary differences between the three species.

== Relationship with Wolbachia ==
Infections of Wolbachia, a commonly infectious strain of bacteria observed in many insects such as Trichogramma and Muscidifurax uniraptor wasps, are transmitted between generations of Drosophila simulans. Wolbachia is inherited through maternal heredity. The infection is maintained through a process involving cytoplasmic incompatibility (CI) in which Wolbachia hinders uninfected individuals from producing offspring.

Wolbachia has formed a symbiotic relationship with D. simulans. Wolbachia infects the cytoplasm of a cell; once infected, a female fly will pass the infection to all resulting offspring through the cytoplasm of her eggs.

Two separate Wolbachia infection events have occurred in the ancestors of D. simulans, suggesting the evolutionary advantage of Wolbachia infections to D. simulans.

=== Effects of Wolbachia infection ===
Wolbachia infections have significantly decreased virus-induced mortality in D. simulans. While the mechanism for the decreased virus-induced mortality is still unknown, Wolbachia provides antiviral properties, potentially perpetuated by outcompeting the virus. Furthermore, different strains of Wolbachia have varying levels of antiviral properties; for example, some strains can protect against DCV (Drosophila C virus) while other strains cannot.

=== Benefits of Wolbachia studies ===
Drosophila simulans has also played an important role in sequencing the genomes for certain Wolbachia strains. D. simulans eggs were infected with the wRi Wolbachia strain in order to better understand how Wolbachia recombines. Further studies can help understand how Wolbachia strains coexist with D. simulans individuals. Studying Wolbachia strains and their mechanisms of infection can provide insight into the complex phylogenetic relationships of arthropods.

== Inbreeding ==
Mating between related individuals tends to produce inbred progeny. Such progeny often have reduced fitness due to increased genetic homozygosity leading to expression of deleterious recessive alleles. This general phenomenon is referred to as inbreeding depression. Among Drosophila simulans inbred males, two fitness characteristics, fertility and attractiveness to females, are especially susceptible to inbreeding depression. Additionally, inbred males have elevated testicular oxidative stress which may underlie their reduced fertility.
