= Drosophila statzi =

Drosophila statzi Temporal range: 28.4–23.03 Ma

Scientific classification
- Kingdom: Animalia
- Phylum: Arthropoda
- Clade: Pancrustacea
- Class: Insecta
- Order: Diptera
- Family: Drosophilidae
- Genus: Drosophila
- Species: †D. statzi

Binomial name
- †Drosophila statzi (Statz, 1940) Ashburner and Bachli, 2004

Synonyms
- †Drosophila elegans Statz, 1940

Extinct species of fly

Drosophila statzi is an extinct species of flies, belonging to the family Drosophilidae. It is from the Upper Oligocene of the Rott Formation in Germany.

The name Drosophila elegans Bock and Wheeler, 1972, though a junior synonym, is used for an extant species found in Taiwan and the Philippines but the International Commission on Zoological Nomenclature ruled for the name to be conserved for the extant species of fruit fly by suppression of its unused senior homonym (replaced by †Drosophila statzi (Statz, 1940) Ashburner and Bachli, 2004).

== See also ==
- List of Drosophila species
