= Hirtodrosophila =

- Hirtodrosophila trivittata on Pleurotus ostreatus

Scientific classification
- Kingdom: Animalia
- Phylum: Arthropoda
- Clade: Pancrustacea
- Class: Insecta
- Order: Diptera
- Family: Drosophilidae
- Tribe: Drosophilini
- Subtribe: Drosophilina
- Infratribe: Drosophiliti
- Genus: Hirtodrosophila; Duda, 1924

Type species
- Drosophila latifrontata Fronta-Pessoa, 1954

Species groups
- 10

Synonyms
- Dasydrosophila Duda, 1925

Genus of flies

Hirtodrosophila is a genus of fruit flies from the family Drosophilidae. Originally Hirtodrosophila was a subgenus of the genus Drosophila. It was raised to the status of genus by Grimaldi in 1990.

It belongs to the monophyletic Zygothrica genus group consisting of the mycophagous genera Hirtodrosophila, Mycodrosophila, Paramycodrosophila, and Zygothrica. It is itself paraphyletic.

== Description ==
The third antennal segment is large, with unusually long setae. Arista with one ventral branch, and anterior reclinate orbital bristle fine. Ventral receptacle in the form of loops, folded flat against the ventral surface of the vagina.

== Distribution ==
Worldwide, though most species are tropical or subtropical in distribution.

== Biology ==
Where known, all species are associated with fungi, which is the preferred larval food.

== Species ==
There are approximately 150 described species divided into ten species groups.

- H. actinia (Okada, 1991)
- H. akabo (Burla, 1954)
- H. alabamensis (Sturtevant, 1918)
- H. albiventer (McEvey and Bock, 1982)
- H. alboralis (Momma and Takada, 1954)
- H. allynensis (Bock, 1976)
- H. alpiniae (Okada and Carson, 1980)
- H. apicohispida (Okada, 1973)
- H. asozana (Okada, 1956)
- H. astioidea Duda, 1923
- H. baechlii (Bock, 1982)
- H. baikalensis Watabe, Toda, and Sidorenko, 1996
- H. batracida Grimaldi, 1994
- H. bicoloripennis (Okada, 1991)
- H. borbonica (Tsacas and David, 1975)
- H. borboros (Bock, 1976)
- H. cameraria (Haliday, 1833)
- H. caputudis (Grimaldi, 1986)
- H. chagrinensis (Stalker and Spencer, 1939)
- H. chandleri (Grimaldi, 1988)
- H. cinerea (Patterson and Wheeler, 1942)
- H. clypeata (Wheeler, 1968)
- H. clypeora (Wheeler, 1968)
- H. clypitata (Grimaldi, 1987)
- H. confusa (Staeger, 1844)
- H. cowani Vilela and Bächli, 2004
- H. danielae (McEvey and Bock, 1982)
- H. dentata Duda, 1924
- H. dolichophallata Kumar and Gupta, 1992
- H. donaldi (Wheeler, 1981)
- H. duncani (Sturtevant, 1918)
- H. durantae (Bock and Parsons, 1979)
- H. elliptosa (Okada, 1974)
- H. fascipennis (Okada, 1967)
- H. flabellopalpis (Okada, 1991)
- H. flavohalterata (Duda, 1925)
- H. furcapenis (Zhang and Liang, 1995)
- H. furcapenisoides (Zhang and Liang, 1995)
- H. fuscohalterata (Duda, 1925)
- H. gavea Vilela and Bächli, 2005
- H. gilva (Burla, 1956)
- H. glabrifrons (Duda, 1925)
- H. grisea (Patterson and Wheeler, 1942)
- H. hannae (Bock and Parsons, 1978)
- H. hexapogon (Okada, 1991)
- H. hexaspina Fartyal and Singh, 2002
- H. hirticornis (Meijere, 1914)
- H. hirtinotata (Okada, 1991)
- H. hirtominuta (Bächli, 1974)
- H. hirtonigra (Bächli, 1974)
- H. hirudo (Bock and Parsons, 1978)
- H. histrioides (Okada and Kurokawa, 1957)
- H. ikedai (Toda, 1989)
- H. innocua (Malloch, 1934)
- H. isatoidea (Bächli, 1974)
- H. jacobsoni (Duda, 1926)
- H. jordanensis (Frota-Pessoa, 1945)
- H. junae (Grossfield in Bock, 1976)
- H. kaindiana (Okada and Carson, 1982)
- H. kangi (Okada and Lee, 1961)
- H. kokodana (Grimaldi, 1990)
- H. kuscheli (Brncic, 1957)
- H. lamingtoni (Bock, 1982)
- H. lappetata (McEvey and Bock, 1982)
- H. latifrontata (Frota-Pessoa, 1945)
- H. latinokogiri (Okada, 1968)
- H. laurelae (Bock, 1982)
- H. levigata (Burla, 1956)
- H. limbicostata (Okada, 1966)
- H. longala (Patterson and Wheeler, 1942)
- H. longecrinita Duda, 1924
- H. longetrinica (Bächli, 1974)
- H. longialata (Takada and Momma, 1975)
- H. longicorpata (Takada and Momma, 1975)
- H. longifurcapenis (Zhang and Liang, 1995)
- H. longiphallus (Gupta and Sundaran, 1990)
- H. longivittata (Hegde, Naseerulla and Jayashankar, 1989)
- H. lundstroemi (Duda, 1935)
- H. macalpinei (Bock, 1976)
- H. macromaculata (Kang and Lee, 1961)
- H. magnarcus (Frota-Pessoa, 1951)
- H. makinoi (Okada, 1956)
- H. manonoensis (Harrison, 1954)
- H. mediohispida (Okada, 1967)
- H. mendeli (Mourao, Gallo and Bicudo, 1965)
- H. menisigra (Bächli, 1974)
- H. mexicoa (Wheeler, 1954)
- H. miniserrata (Okada, 1991)
- H. minuscula Vilela and Bächli, 2005
- H. mixtura (Bock, 1976)
- H. morgani (Mourao, Gallo and Bicudo, 1967)
- H. mycetophaga (Malloch, 1924)
- H. narinosa (Frota-Pessoa, 1945)
- H. naumanni (Bock, 1986)
- H. neomakinoi (Gupta and Singh, 1981)
- H. nigripennis (Kang, Lee and Bahng, 1965)
- H. nigriventer (McEvey and Bock, 1982)
- H. nigrohalterata (Duda, 1925)
- H. nokogiri (Okada, 1956)
- H. novicia (Wheeler and Takada, 1964)
- H. nubalata (Okada, 1991)
- H. nudimanona (Okada, 1991)
- H. nudinokogiri (Okada, 1967)
- H. okadomei (Okada, 1967)
- H. oldenbergi (Duda, 1924)
- H. omogoensis (Okada, 1956)
- H. orbospiracula (Patterson and Wheeler, 1942)
- H. ordinaria (Coquillett, 1904)
- H. paiviae (Toda and Riihimaa in Toda et al., 1987)
- H. paleothoracis (Grimaldi, 1987)
- H. paleovitta (Grimaldi, 1990)
- H. palumae (Bock, 1976)
- H. paradentata (Bächli, 1974)
- H. paralatifrontata (Bächli, 1974)
- H. paralatinokogiri (Okada, 1991)
- H. paramanona (Okada, 1991)
- H. pentavittata (Gupta and Ray-Chaudhuri, 1970)
- H. pichis (Vilela and Bächli, 1990)
- H. pictiventris (Duda, 1925)
- H. pleuralis (Williston, 1896)
- H. pleurostrigata (Burla, 1956)
- H. poecilogastra (Duda, 1926)
- H. polypori (Malloch, 1924)
- H. prognatha (Sturtevant, 1916)
- H. pseudonokogiri (Kang, Lee and Bahng, 1965)
- H. quadrivittata (Okada, 1956)
- H. ramulosa (Burla, 1956)
- H. reilliana (Bock, 1982)
- H. sanyi (Burla, 1954)
- H. scutellata (Duda, 1926)
- H. seminigra (Duda, 1926)
- H. seminokogiri (Okada, 1967)
- H. sexvittata (Okada, 1956)
- H. shaitanensis (Sidorenko in Toda et al., 1996)
- H. shiptonensis (Bock, 1984)
- H. solomonica (Takada, 1983)
- H. spinicauda (Malloch, 1926)
- H. spinipes (Lamb, 1914)
- H. strigocula (Burla, 1956)
- H. subflavohalterata (Burla, 1956)
- H. subgilva (Burla, 1956)
- H. sublineata (Duda, 1926)
- H. taeniopleura (Okada, 1991)
- H. tenuinokogiri (Okada, 1991)
- H. thoracis (Williston, 1896)
- H. toyohiokadai (Sidorenko, 1990)
- H. tozana (Bock, 1989)
- H. trapezina Duda, 1923
- H. tricolora (Bock, 1976)
- H. trifasciata (Meijere, 1916)
- H. trifurca (Bock, 1982)
- H. trilineata (Chung, 1960)
- H. trivittata (Strobl, 1893)
- H. unicolorata (Wheeler, 1959)
- H. ussurica (Duda, 1935)
- H. vina (Burla, 1954)
- H. whianensis (Bock, 1976)
- H. yakushimana (Okada, 1967)
