= Drosophila populi species group =

Scientific classification
- Kingdom: Animalia
- Phylum: Arthropoda
- Class: Insecta
- Order: Diptera
- Family: Drosophilidae
- Genus: Drosophila
- Subgenus: Sophophora
- Species group: populi Lemeunier and Ashburner, 1976

Species
- Drosophila ingrica; Drosophila populi

Group of flies

The Holarctic Drosophila populi species group belongs to the subgenus Sophophora and contains two species, Drosophila ingrica and Drosophila populi. D. ingrica is found in the Palearctic, while D. populi is found in the Nearctic. Both species are found in the northernmost subarctic forest zone, and are strongly associated with cottonwood trees.
