= Hirtodrosophila confusa =

Scientific classification
- Kingdom: Animalia
- Phylum: Arthropoda
- Clade: Pancrustacea
- Class: Insecta
- Order: Diptera
- Family: Drosophilidae
- Subtribe: Drosophilina
- Infratribe: Drosophiliti
- Genus: Hirtodrosophila
- Species: H. confusa

Binomial name
- Hirtodrosophila confusa (Stæger, 1844)

Synonyms
- Drosophila confusa Stæger, 1844; Drosophila vibrissina Duda, 1924; Drosophila grischuna Burla, 1951

Species of insect (drosophilid fly)

Hirtodrosophila confusa is a widespread, but rare European species of fruit fly from the family Drosophilidae.

== Description ==
Relatively large species (for Drosophilidae), wing length about 3.5 mm (0.14 in), generally yellowish body with some variable brown triangular marking on the dorsal surface of the abdomen, wings yellowish.

== Distribution ==
Widespread in most of the Palaearctic though rare in northern parts, absent from Great Britain.

== Biology ==
It is mostly associated with woodland habitat types. Specimens have been reared from fungi, which is suspected to the preferred larval food. Populations peak in about July.
