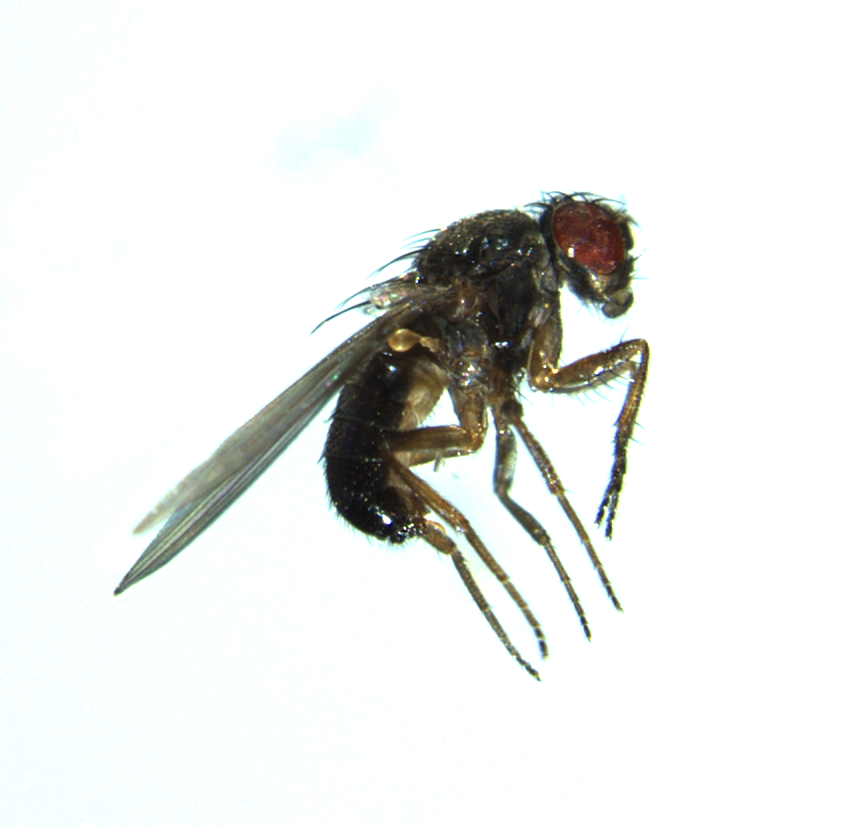
- A D. pseudoobscura male

Scientific classification
- Kingdom: Animalia
- Phylum: Arthropoda
- Class: Insecta
- Order: Diptera
- Family: Drosophilidae
- Genus: Drosophila
- Subgenus: Sophophora
- Species group: Drosophila obscura species group
- Species: D. pseudoobscura

Binomial name
- Drosophila pseudoobscura Frolova, 1929

= Drosophila pseudoobscura =

Species of fly

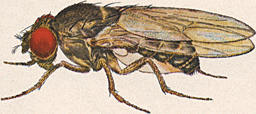
Illustration of a D. pseudoobscura male

Drosophila pseudoobscura is a species of fruit fly, used extensively in lab studies of speciation. It is native to western North America.

In 2005, D. pseudoobscura was the second Drosophila species to have its genome sequenced, after the model organism Drosophila melanogaster.

Allopatric speciation has been induced by reproductive isolation in D. pseudoobscura after only eight generations using different food types, starch and maltose.

== Polyandry ==
Female Drosophila pseudoobscura are polyandrous, meaning they mate with more than one male. By mating with multiple males, polyandrous females have more genetically diverse offspring.

=== Fitness benefits ===
==== Prevention of extinction ====
In the D. pseudoobscura population, some males have a harmful chromosome called sex ratio (SR), where an inactive Y-chromosome is transmitted. If an SR male mates with a female, the female will produce only daughters. Monandry allows the spread of SR and increases the extinction risk in species having SR genes because the SR driver can spread quickly, enriching populations for females. Polyandry decreases the SR gene frequency because the non-SR male sperm outcompete the SR male sperm. Therefore, polyandry results in a decreased risk of extinction in the population.

==== Increased net offspring survival ====
Monandrous female D. pseudoobscura do not obtain sufficient sperm or a plenty of suitable sperm for the fertilization. Even though monandrous female experiencing multiple copulations can produce more eggs than polyandrous female experiencing multiple copulations, monandrous females produce less offspring that survive into adulthood than polyandrous females do. This means that polyandrous females have higher egg-to-adult survival ratio than monandrous females, making the polyandrous females more fit.

==== Mate selection as a fitness benefit ====
Polyandrous relationships benefit females D. pseudoobscura. In males D. pseudoobscura, the variation in number of sperms shows the difference in benefits between polyandrous and monandrous females. Males D. pseudoobscura ejaculate more sperm than any other Drosophila species, and it provides important nourishing factors to females and their offspring. The offspring viability benefits are increased by multiple and variable sperms through ejaculates. There are no additional costs to polyandrous females, because there are not big differences in life expectancy between monandrous female experiencing multiple copulations and polyandrous female experiencing multiple copulations.

=== Evolutionary consequences ===
Polyandry, in general, may have a few fitness consequences. Densely populated areas may have lower rates of polyandry due to environmental restraints such as geographic location and limited resources. This can greatly limit the survival and reproduction of offspring. Therefore, in population dense areas, polyandrous behavior may actually be a fitness consequence since the environment significantly controls the number of offspring that survive.

Polyandry could also pose genetic fitness consequences. Polyandry does not always result in the spread of the most adaptive genes. For example, some individuals may appear to be attractive due to genes that code for increased pheromone production. As a result, attractive individuals are more likely to reproduce more often. However, since these individuals do not always contain adaptive genes, multiple mating events do not always result in the propagation of adaptive genes.

== Pheromones ==
Ehrman et al. made extensive studies of D. pseudoobscura males' mating pheromones – both as isolate and as whole body extracts – in the 1970s. They found CH (see § Chiricahua below) extract to be soluble in hexane and insoluble in acetone, and AR the inverse. In Leonard et al. 1974 (a) they find the female response to male extract to be so linear as to be usable to assay for male pheromone content of an arbitrary extract.

== Strains ==
Strains in common laboratory use include:

- Chiricahua or CH. Differs from AR only by a third chromosome inversion.
- Arrowhead or AR. Differs from CH only by an inversion on the third chromosome.
