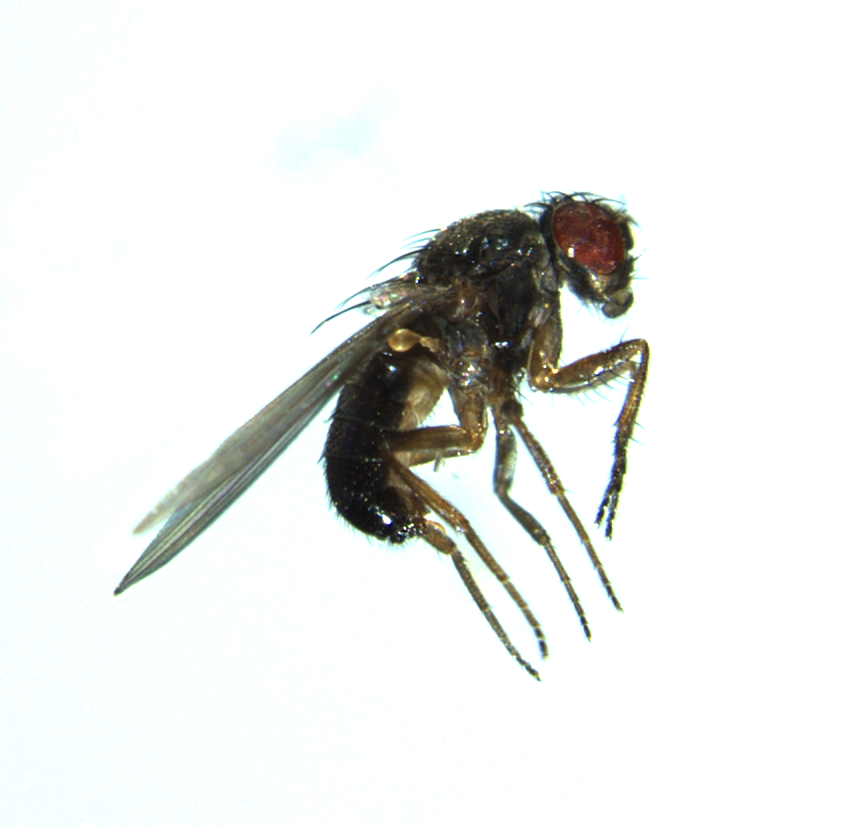
- Drosophila pseudoobscura

Scientific classification
- Kingdom: Animalia
- Phylum: Arthropoda
- Class: Insecta
- Order: Diptera
- Family: Drosophilidae
- Genus: Drosophila
- Subgenus: Sophophora
- Species group: Drosophila obscura species group Sturtevant, 1942

Species subgroups
- affinis; microlabis; obscura; pseudoobscura; sinobscura; subobscura

= Drosophila obscura species group =

Group of flies

The Drosophila obscura species group belongs to the subgenus Sophophora and contains 6 subgroups: affinis, microlabis, obscura, pseudoobscura, subobscura, and sinobscura.

== Species ==
affinis species subgroup

- Drosophila affinis Sturtevant, 1916
- Drosophila algonquin Sturtevant and Dobzhansky, 1936
- Drosophila athabasca Sturtevant and Dobzhansky, 1936
- Drosophila azteca Sturtevant and Dobzhansky, 1936
- Drosophila dobzhanskii Patterson, 1943
- Drosophila inexspectata Tsacas, 1988
- Drosophila narragansett Sturtevant and Dobzhansky, 1936
- Drosophila novitskii Sulerud and Miller, 1966
- Drosophila seminole Sturtevant and Dobzhansky, 1936
- Drosophila tolteca Patterson and Mainland, 1944

microlabis species subgroup

- Drosophila kitumensis Tsacas in Tsacas et al., 1985
- Drosophila microlabis Seguy, 1938

obscura species subgroup

- Drosophila ambigua Pomini, 1940
- Drosophila bifasciata Pomini, 1940
- Drosophila cariouae Tsacas in Tsacas et al., 1985
- Drosophila dianensis Gao and Watabe, 2003
- Drosophila eniwae Takada, Beppu and Toda, 1979
- Drosophila epiobscura Parshad and Duggal, 1966
- Drosophila eskoi Lakovaara and Lankinen, 1974
- Drosophila frolovae Wheeler, 1949
- Drosophila imaii Moriwaki and Okada in Moriwaki et al., 1967
- Drosophila krimbasi Tsacas in Tsacas et al., 1985
- Drosophila limingi Gao and Watabe, 2003
- Drosophila obscura Fallen, 1823
- Drosophila solstitialis Chen, 1994
- Drosophila subsilvestris Hardy & Kaneshiro, 1968
- Drosophila tristis Fallen, 1823
- Drosophila tsukubaensis Takamori and Okada, 1983

pseudoobscura species subgroup

- Drosophila cuauhtemoci Felix and Dobzhansky in Felix et al., 1976
- Drosophila lowei Heed, Crumpacker and Ehrman, 1968
- Drosophila maya Heed and O'Grady, 2000
- Drosophila miranda Dobzhansky, 1935
- Drosophila persimilis Dobzhansky and Epling, 1944
- Drosophila pseudoobscura Frolova in Frolova and Astaurov, 1929

sinobscura species subgroup

- Drosophila hubeiensis Sperlich and Watabe in Watabe and Sperlich, 1997
- Drosophila luguensis Gao and Toda, 2003
- Drosophila sinobscura Watabe in Watabe et al., 1996

subobscura species subgroup

- Drosophila guanche Monclus, 1976
- Drosophila madeirensis Monclus, 1984
- Drosophila subobscura Collin in Gordon, 1936

Unplaced

- Drosophila alpina Burla, 1948
- Drosophila helvetica Burla, 1948
- Drosophila hypercephala Gao and Toda, 2009
- Drosophila hideakii Gao and Toda, 2009
- Drosophila quadrangula Gao and Toda, 2009
