= Hirtodrosophila mycetophaga =

Scientific classification
- Kingdom: Animalia
- Phylum: Arthropoda
- Clade: Pancrustacea
- Class: Insecta
- Order: Diptera
- Family: Drosophilidae
- Subtribe: Drosophilina
- Infratribe: Drosophiliti
- Genus: Hirtodrosophila
- Species: H. mycetophaga

Binomial name
- Hirtodrosophila mycetophaga (Malloch, 1924)

Synonyms
- Drosophila mycetophaga Malloch, 1924

Species of insect (drosophilid fly)

Hirtodrosophila mycetophaga is a fairly large drosophilid fly, with a mean length of 4.0–4.5 mm. It has thus far only been found in Australia. It mates on bracket fungi, preferentially those with a lighter-colored surface in order to enhance mating displays. In addition to these physical displays, flies emit specific sounds in order to attract and ultimately copulate with females.

In a laboratory, the fly's life cycle spans 17 days. It is one of three Australian species reported to court and mate using a lekking system. However, there is some controversy on whether or not the fly is a true lekking species.

== Description ==
H. mycetophaga has a mean length from its head to the tip of its wing of 4.0 mm for males, and 4.5 mm for females. The fly's lifespan has yet to be recorded in the wild, but averaged 17 days in the laboratory. The fly is primarily located in Australian rainforests, from eastern Victoria to south-central Queensland. It was first discovered by the Ourimbah Creek in New South Wales, in 1924.

== Habitat ==
Hirtodrosophila mycetophaga typically prefers habitats that are naturally wet and humid, as the fly is very susceptible to desiccation. This is especially true for flies that are newly emerged; if the fly does not receive fresh food within a day of emergence, it will dehydrate rapidly.

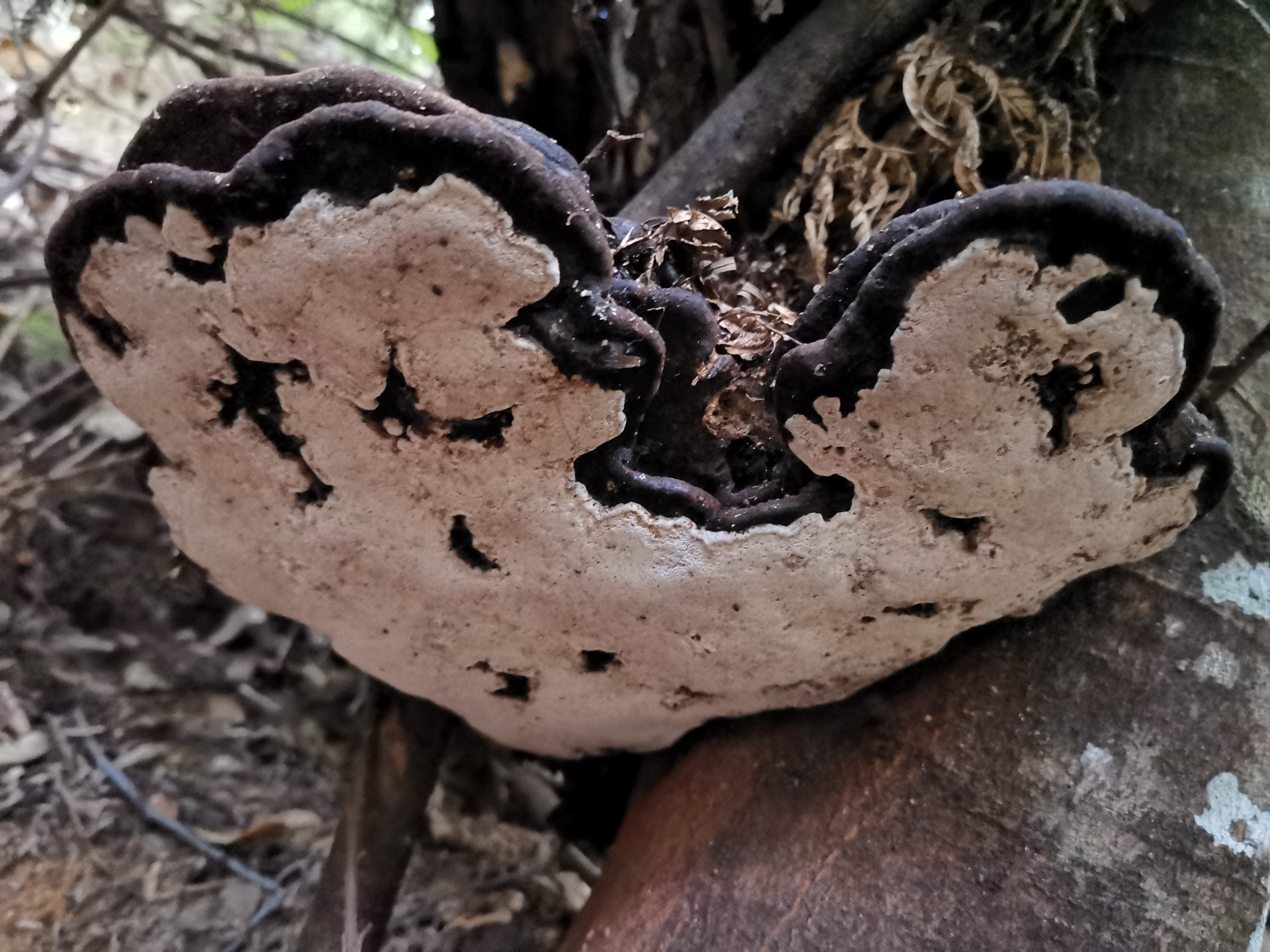
Bracket fungus found in Columba Falls, Pyengana Tasmania

The fly's courtship and mating territory is the horizontal underside of the bracket fungus, Ganoderma applanatum. These fungi are often found growing out of the side of fallen trees and are plentiful in the wet forest. This means that the fly typically has many opportunities to disperse throughout the forest. On an individual bracket fungus flies are spread relatively evenly. Some of these brackets will ripen and become covered in a white layer, interrupted by pores. The underside of the fungus varies in color depending on the developmental stage of the fungus itself. However, H. mycetophaga will only be found on the fungus if the fungus is white- or grey- colored. This enhances the contrast between the fly and its surroundings and makes mating displays easier to see. Flies tend to choose brackets that are ripe and actively discharging spores. They also require some access to light and may be found in regions under which light is able to travel through the dense forest canopy.

Researchers have suggested that adult flies prefer to live on fresh mushrooms, while larvae prefer to occupy decaying fungi. In addition, flies use the bracket fungus to camouflage themselves. When a lek is observed from the side, it is more difficult to detect and is therefore less visible to predators, particularly terrestrial predators like spiders and lizards.

== Home range and territoriality ==
Once a male H. mycetophaga comes to a lek, he typically remains in the same location throughout the day. Male patrolling displays include bobbing and holding wings apart. Males tend to occupy a particular region of a bracket fungus, but territories shift over time as males defend mobile zones, termed moving territories. Researchers found that nine out of ten flies reappeared from one day to the next, either to the same fungus or to a nearby one.

In courtship, females are more passive in that they move less on the fungus throughout the process. Males meanwhile move frequently, typically sideways. However, females do extend their wings to other flies in order to respond to courtship exchanges. Females will either accept the male's advances by voluntarily assuming a copulatory position or reject the advances by raising her abdomen.

=== Access to female mates in leks ===
When females visit the lek, they typically appear on the edges and stay for shorter periods of time than males do. Females are also outnumbered by males. Differential access to mates has been observed in males; certain males tend to dominate the edges where females first arrive, while others are relegated to inferior positions toward the center of the lek. The male closest to a newly arrived female approaches her and displays wing-scissoring behavior. In the event that other males attempt to copulate with the female, the original male will interrupt courtship to chase the other male away. These chases are usually brief and successful, with the original male being able to retain control of the female.

In leks, females tend to associate with larger male aggregations. The general likelihood that a fungus will be occupied increases with its surface area; larger bracket fungi have more flies. However, researchers have confirmed via a multiple Poisson regression analysis that fungus area does not directly affect female distribution; male distribution is the independent variable manipulated. Females do not occupy larger bracket fungi in response to the area itself, but the fact that more males are present on them.

=== Male defense of resources ===
In addition, researchers believe that the presence of optimal breeding sites or specific resources for females does not dictate where aggregations were formed. Aggregations were observed in areas without resources, and fungi with ample resources were not used more often than those without resources. Males were even more evenly distributed than would be expected through a random distribution. This provides evidence that males intentionally stay away from each other, and this dispersion pattern (as well as the female dispersion) provides evidence for the lek mating system. It is unknown if other environmental factors may influence which specific sites H. mycetophaga utilizes.

== Food resources ==
Many, but not all, H. mycetophaga feed on fungi. Woody tissue and other woody material has been found in the digestive tracts of these flies, particularly from fungal mycelia. Larvae have been reared in a medium of bran-agar infected with molds, and these larvae fed well in this experiment. Most of the fungal material consumed by these flies develops on wood.

== Mating ==
Immediately before copulation begins, the male fly moves underneath the female's abdomen in order to initiate copulation thrusts. The male then mounts the female, forcing her wings apart. Copulation lasts between 17–22 minutes and terminates when the female removes the male from her body. H. mycetophaga eggs are easily noticeable and are held up by four long filaments that emerge from the substrate. Courtships were rarely observed in younger virgin flies (1–3 days old); 6–9 days of age seemed to be the primary age at which females became sexually receptive to male advances.

=== Courtship behaviors ===
==== Overlapping behaviors between sexes ====
Courtship behaviors observed in both female and male H. mycetophaga are similar to those found in other flies of the same genus. Prominent wing displays are the primary similarity between the two. Both sexes move their abdomen up and down during courtship rituals, and have been observed to touch tarsi with each other. They will also sometimes attempt to use their middle and fore legs to trample the fly that they are oriented towards. Additionally, both males and females extend one wing 90 degrees in displays. The presence of female wing display in this species is noteworthy; previously, this had only been noted in the "lesbian" mutant phenotype of D. melanogaster. Males and females both also showed waxing behavior, which entails the rapid raising and lowering of wings alternately.

==== Differing behaviors between sexes ====
Males may demonstrate additional courtship behavior in the form of wing vibration and scissoring. Vibration is when the male holds his wings apart 45 degrees from one another. This behavior was found during the male's approach of the female, as well as during the chasing stage. Scissoring is when the male holds his wings 90 degrees apart to form a seamless line across the body. This typically lasts longer than vibration. Scissoring was more often present during circling of the female as opposed to approaching. Several long bouts of scissoring are displayed to initiate copulation.

=== Mating sounds ===
Sounds accompanied the vibration and scissoring, but not wing extension. Vibration in H. mycetophaga appears as a pulse song with an inter-pulse ratio (the amount of time elapsed between pulses) of 46 ms. Scissoring appears as a sine song. A male tunes his aristae—the large bristle attached to the front part of the antennae—more closely with the intra-pulse frequencies of the pulse song, as opposed to the sine song. The typical frequency of this call is 180 Hz, but this slows to 82 Hz as the male's wings close in preparation for copulation. The sine song has been shown to increase a female's sexual activity as well as receptivity, and decreases the likelihood that she will attempt to resist the mating. Moreover, the sine song was used with females that moved around less frequently, while the pulse song was employed while following or approaching females that were more active.

==== Differences in mating sounds among species ====
There are other fly species that have evolved to display similar songs during different combinations of these behaviors. There are also certain similarities. D. nitidithorax has a vibration pulse song. In D. enigma and D. lativittata, the wing extend is also silent. Meanwhile, in D. novamaculosa, there is a bobbing pulse song and all wing movements are silent. There are differences across species in the number of pulses present within one given round of a song, and the length of the inter-pulse interval also varies. A key distinction between H. mycetophaga and some other fly species is that singing in H. mycetophaga occurs with both wings. Use of only one wing, or even abdominal vibrations, is more commonly found.

=== Lek behavior ===
Mating success for males increases with the size of the lek along with the probability of female encounter. This relationship is linear; as size of lek increases, mating success increases proportionally. However, mating success plateaus after more than 20 males gather in one lek. The causal relationship between increased female encounter rate and increased mating success has not yet been established. The ideal free distribution has been tested with leks, and rejected as each male does not have an equal opportunity to mate. Females prefer males in aggregations, as opposed to solitary males, and also do not choose equally within an aggregation. Females are more likely to mate if the lek contains over five individuals; therefore, the optimal size for a lek is in between five and 20 males.

Leks may have evolved away from the source of food because sexual displays would not be easily visible in the poorly-lit forest. The fact that flies tend to aggregate only on fungi with lighter backgrounds, increasing the visibility of displays, is further evidence for this theory; visibility also accounts for the wing display behavior observed. Visual stimulation seems to dominate leks, though olfactory stimulation through pheromones may be involved as well.

H. mycetophaga is one of few species of Hirtodrosophila that exhibits lek mating. There is a Hawaiian lekking species that is closely related, belonging to the subgenus Drosophila. The presence of lekking in these related species may have resulted from convergent evolution. In the Hawaiian Drosophila however, leks occur on the smooth surface of a fern leaf instead of the underside of a bracket fungus.

==== Female-initiated vs. male-initiated models ====
Female-initiated models of lekking suggest that male aggregations are primarily shaped by female mate choice. On the other hand, male-initiated models suggest that female choice does not actively influence male dispersion or settlement patterns. If the female-dominant model is supported, number of females (along with average male mating success) should increase with the size of the male aggregation. Meanwhile, if the male-initiated model is supported, then the distribution of males should be proportional to the number of females present. However, male-initiated leks fall in line with the ideal free distribution model and the theory has therefore been rejected. Consequently, leks are more likely female-initiated.

==== Hotspot model ====
The hotspot model is one of many that have been proposed to explain lek mating. This male-initiated model suggests that male aggregations are concentrated based on areas of high female presence. However, this model may not fully account for the behavior seen in H. mycetophaga. Previous observations have shown that the presence of exudates (fluid emerging from the inside of an organism through some sort of opening), which would attract females, does not influence where displays occur. Therefore, this model cannot fully account for lek mating in the species. It is possible that the distribution of certain resources may influence initial clumping.

==== Costs of displaying in groups ====
Though large aggregations of males are generally more successful, there may be costs of joining that would prevent males from joining. As group size increases, there may be increasingly antagonistic interactions between males. Those males that are not dominant within the group may suffer more from these conflicts, outweighing the benefits of joining the lek. These males may be forced off of display sites. Even though these males are not necessarily significantly smaller than the others, there may be other factors that make them subordinate compared to other males and unable to defend their territory such as age or previous conflict history. The interference model may more accurately explain behavior in this species, as evidence of aggressive encounters within the lek has been found. Poor males are forced onto smaller leks. The most competitive males are found at the best sites on the lek. These males are attractive to females because they provide genetic benefits which will be passed on to the offspring.

== Controversy in mating hypotheses ==
Leks have previously been used to explain how species avoid predation risks associated with displaying at these aggregation sites. However, the idea that lek mating is present in H. mycetophaga has been contested. One study suggests instead that the flies simply use the bracket fungi as a breeding and food source.

The authors of this paper confirm that collections of flies are present in male aggregations on the white areas of bracket fungi. However, females tend to aggregate around exudates (resulting from the tineid moth larvae's damage). In fact, females were rarely found on fungi without exudate. Immature H. mycetophaga in particular have been identified in these exudates, as the exudate is used by females as a breeding and feeding source. Males may then display on and defend these resources because of their proximity to those used by females. Therefore, male competition plays a larger part in male distribution than female choice does. According to this hypothesis, larger fungi would be preferred as they provide larger display areas and more exudate for feeding and breeding.

The authors suggest that this challenges the idea of a lek by definition. Males are aggregating around resources, which goes against the definition of lekking, in which males gather in an area with little to no resources to breed and no feeding or egg-laying goes on there. The authors contest that leks should not be used for feeding or breeding, and provide females with no resources apart from the male. Males should not compete for resources that females seek, and arriving females should choose among males based on courtship alone.

== Social behavior ==
H. mycetophaga are considered non-social insects, excepting the grouping inherent in their lekking behavior. Despite this, groups of two or more adults have been observed to form at different sites. However, other adults of the same species have been observed to avoid joining such groups. Flies intentionally space themselves as well as their progeny out from other flies. Only about 6% of males were seen outside leks, demonstrating a clear benefit to grouping; grouped males have a greater per capita probability of encountering receptive females than do isolated males. As many as 70 males of H. mycetophaga have been observed on a single bracket fungus at one time.

== Conservation ==
Though not necessarily specific to H. mycetophaga, the species has been included in general reports that Drosophila can be used as a biological indicator of the health of an ecosystem or environment, particularly in recent times of climate change. Studies indicate that extinctions and re-appearances of rare rain forest species, like H. mycetophaga, follow increases under periods of environmental stress. Overall, this can be used to assess the impact on biodiversity. Drosophila in rain forests are especially significant as they tend to have close interactions with the flora of rain forests. H. mycetophaga collections in Palmerston National Park, north Queensland, were assessed in particular. These collections were found 500 meters inside the forest.
