= Drosophila melanogaster species group =

Scientific classification
- Kingdom: Animalia
- Phylum: Arthropoda
- Class: Insecta
- Order: Diptera
- Family: Drosophilidae
- Genus: Drosophila
- Subgenus: Sophophora
- Species group: melanogaster

Species subgroups
- denticulata; elegans; eugracilis; ficusphila; flavohirta; longissima; melanogaster; rhopaloa; suzukii; takahashii

Species group of flies

The Drosophila melanogaster species group belongs to the subgenus Sophophora and contains 10 subgroups. The phylogeny in this species group is poorly known despite many studies covering many of the species subgroups. The most likely explanation is that the various subgroups diverged from each other in a relatively short evolutionary time frame. Three subgroups have not yet been investigated in molecular studies, and their position in the phylogeny is unclear. The suzukii subgroup is paraphyletic as D. lucipennis is systematically placed within the elegans subgroup.

- - - - - melanogaster species subgroup
        - flavohirta species subgroup
      - - takahashii and suzukii species subgroup
        - eugracilis species subgroup
    - ficusphila species subgroup
  - - elegans species subgroup
    - rhopaloa species subgroup

Species subgroups:

- D. denticulata species subgroup
- D. elegans species subgroup
- D. eugracilis species subgroup
- D. ficusphila species subgroup
- D. flavohirta species subgroup
- D. longissima species subgroup
- D. melanogaster species subgroup
- D. rhopaloa species subgroup
- D. suzukii species subgroup
- D. takahashii species subgroup
