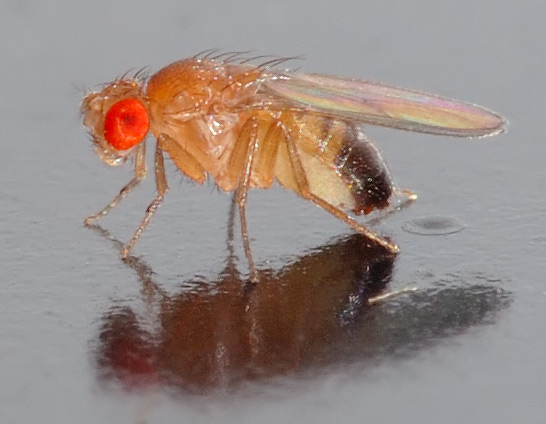
- A male Drosophila melanogaster fly

Scientific classification
- Domain: Eukaryota
- Kingdom: Animalia
- Phylum: Arthropoda
- Class: Insecta
- Order: Diptera
- Family: Drosophilidae
- Subfamily: Drosophilinae
- Genus: Drosophila
- Subgenus: Sophophora; Sturtevant, 1939

Type species
- Drosophila melanogaster Meigen, 1830

Species groups
- ananassae; dentissima; dispar; fima; melanogaster; montium; obscura; populi; saltans; setifemus; willistoni

= Sophophora =

Subgenus of flies

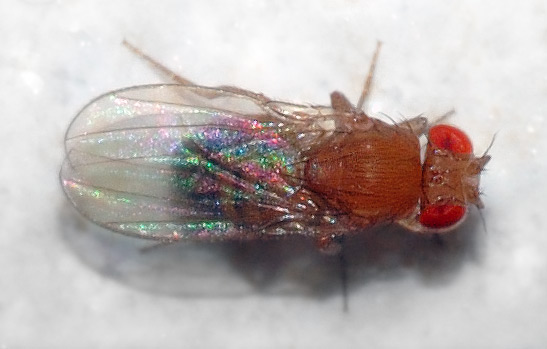
small Drosophila melanogaster fly.

The paraphyletic subgenus Sophophora of the genus Drosophila was first described by Alfred Sturtevant in 1939. It contains the best-known drosophilid species, Drosophila melanogaster. Sophophora translates as carrier (phora) of wisdom (sophos). The subgenus is paraphyletic because the genus Lordiphosa and the species Hirtodrosophila duncani are also placed within this subgenus.

== Phylogeny ==
- Sophophora
  - Old World
    - - - melanogaster species group
        - montium species group
      - - ananassae species group
        - fima species group
    - obscura species group
  - New World
    - - willistoni species group
      - saltans species group
    - Lordiphosa
    - Hirtodrosophila duncani

Currently, 10 species groups are recognized, in two main groups, the New World and the Old World

Old World:

- melanogaster species group (65 species, including D. melanogaster and D. simulans)
- montium species group (88)
- ananassae species group (24)
- obscura species group (44)
- dentissima species group (17)
- fima species group (23)
- dispar species group (2)
- settifemur species group (2)

New World:

- saltans species group (21)
- willistoni species group (23)

Unknown:

- populi species group (2)
