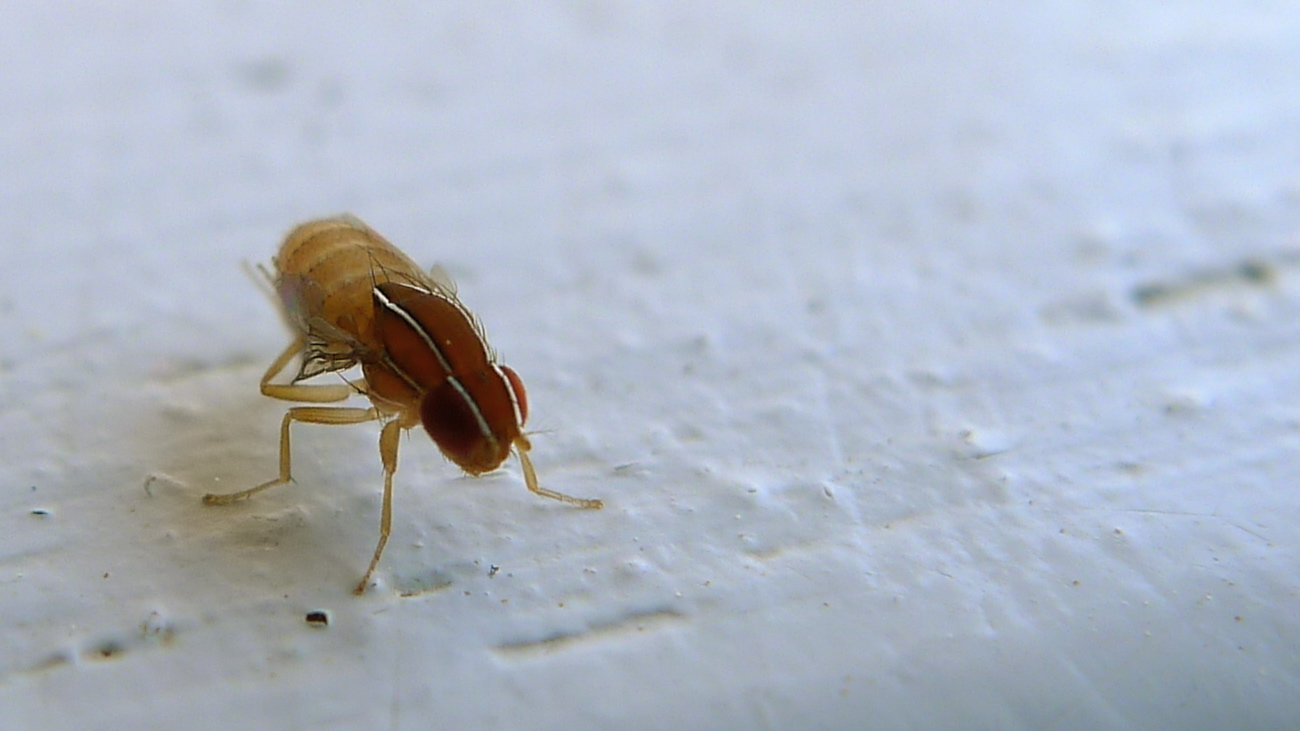

Scientific classification
- Kingdom: Animalia
- Phylum: Arthropoda
- Class: Insecta
- Order: Diptera
- Family: Drosophilidae
- Genus: Zaprionus
- Subgenus: Zaprionus
- Species: Z. tuberculatus

Binomial name
- Zaprionus tuberculatus Malloch, 1932

= Zaprionus tuberculatus =

Species of fly

Zaprionus tuberculatus (commonly known as the vinegar fly or the pomace fly) is a member of the subgenus and genus Zaprionus, family Drosophilidae, and order Diptera. It is an invasive fruit fly that originated in Africa, but can also be found in Europe and Asia. The fly earned its common name, the "vinegar fly", because researchers frequently captured the species using vinegar traps. Z. tuberculatus was previously considered a strictly tropical fly, but evidence of invasion to nontropical regions such as Turkey has been shown.

This fly typically resides on rotting fruit, and the larvae have been found to develop on 49 species of fruits. The life cycle of the fly depends on the temperature of the environment as males are sterile at or above 30 degrees Celsius. It is reddish-brick colored and contains four longitudinal stripes down its head and body. The courtship behavior includes song singing and complex dance rituals. In regard to other organisms, Z. tuberculatus is considered a secondary pest to fruit and a potential threat to ecosystems it invades. A close relative, Z. indianus is an invasive fly species that infests fig orchards.

== Taxonomy ==
Phylogeny of the genus Drosophila and included genera

- - - - immigrans-tripunctata radiation
      - - - D. quadrilineata species group
          - Samoaia
        - - Zaprionus
          - - D. tumiditarsus species group
            - Liodrosophila
    - Dichaetophora, Hirtodrosophila, Mycodrosophila and Paramycodrosophila
    - - - virilis-repleta radiation and subgenus Siphlodora
      - Hawaiian Drosophilidae
      - D. polychaeta species group
  - Dorsilopha
- Sophophora and included groups

Simplified phylogenetic tree of the genus Drosophila and included genera with a focus on the phylogenetic position of the genus Zaprionus.

Zaprionus tuberculatus was first discriminated from its close relative Z. sepsoides in the 1970s. Z. tuberculatus has recently classified as a member of the Tuberculatus species subgroup and is a member of the inermis species group. Previously, Z. tuberculatus was classified as a member of the armatus group. The genus Zaprionus if primarily found throughout Africa and contains 59 species, the most common of which being Z. indianus and Z. tuberculatus. The 59 species of the genus Zaprionus are divided into two subgroups: Afrotropical Zaprionus sensu stricto (s.s.), to which Z. tuberculatus belongs, and Anaprionus near Asia and Australia. Within the Zaprionus sensu stricto (s.s.) subgenus are several further subgroups, including the armatus subgroup to which Z. tuberculatus belonged until 2010.

== Description ==
Zaprionus tuberculatus contains four white horizontal stripes across its head and thorax, similar to other members of the Zaprionus subgroup. The males bear hairs on its forelegs. Both male and female flies have a protruding bristle from the forefemur. The frons have a medium-white stripe and the aedeagus is robust and curved and they have a dark-brown colored thorax. Two white, aligned, horizontal lines characterize the mesonotum and metanotum. Z. tuberculatus shares several common features with other members of the genus Zaprionus, including a completely smooth larval cephalopharyngeal.

=== Reproductive system ===
Between individual flies, siblings are distinguished by testicular size (TST), for which the mean is 3.2mm. The average seminal recepaical (SR) of a female fly is 3.6mm.

== Distribution ==
Zaprionus tuberculatus, originally from islands near the Indian Ocean and Afrotropical Region, then became invasive and expanded geographically to southern Europe. Within the Afrotropical region, the species has been reported in Mauritius, Réunion, Madagascar, Saint-Helena, Cape Verde, and Seychelles . The species had first been reported in Europe in Italy September, 2013. Z. tuberculatus has also been reported in North Africa, Malta, Cyprus, and the Canary Islands. Z. tuberculatus was trapped in Eastern Europe in Southern Romania between September and October 2014. Z. tuberculatus has been reported in a few other areas of Europe, including Spain, Greece, and Northern Italy. Z. tuberculatus has also been reported in Asian regions, including Israel and southern Turkey.

=== Habitat ===
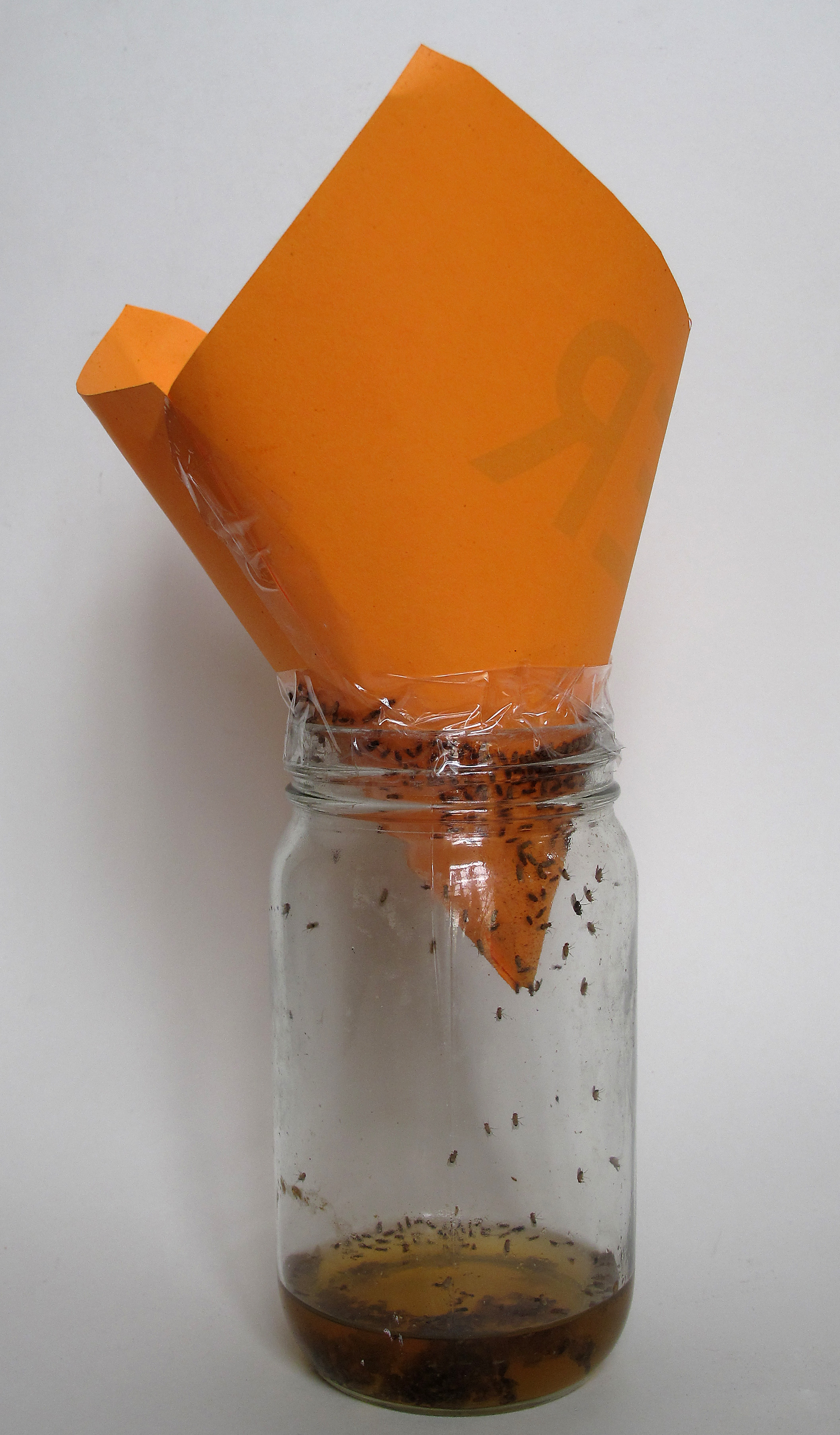
Vinegar trap similar to the tool used to capture Z. tuberculatus in the wild

Zaprionus tuberculatus typically reside on rotting fruit and has been captured via the use of vinegar traps, which earned the species its nickname "vinegar fly." The fly does not thrive in strictly tropical environments.

=== Ecology ===
Zaprionus tuberculatus is an invasive species, meaning its spread from one geographical region to other may harm to existing ecosystems.

== Life cycle ==
Zaprionus tuberculatus life cycle varies depending on the temperature of the environment. Zaprionus tuberculatus males are sterile at or above 30 degrees Celsius. The mean Z. tuberculatus female life span varies from about 40 days to 60 days, whereas the mean male lifespan varies from about 50 to 200 days when temperature is varied.

=== Egg ===
The eggs of Z. tuberculatus have four filaments, with the posterior filaments being elongated more than the anterior filaments and are spatulated. The lengths of these filaments vary within species.

=== Larvae ===
The larvae of Z. tuberculatus generally grows on over-ripe fruits and has been found to develop on 49 species of fruits. Similar to other drosophilids, the larvae of Z. tuberculatus have a respiratory system containing thoracic and anterior spiracles on either side of the body, which is a systems organization referred to as amphipneustic.

=== Puparium ===
The pupae of Z. tuberculatus have a brick red color. The anterior branches belonging to Z. tuberculatus are clubbed type and vary in number from 11 to 14. The puparial shape (Puparial length:PI) of Z. tuberculatus is 2.59. Puparial shape is an important measurement because it distinguishes Z. tuberculatus from several closely related fly species, including Z. inermis (puparial shape =2.62), Z. cercus (puparial shape =2.40), and Z. burlai (puparial shape = 2.29). Similarly, another taxonomic measurement, the horn index (H) discriminates Z. tuberculatus (H= 7.0) from closely related fly species such as Z. verruca (H=10.6) and Z. burlai (H = 7.2). Unlike other species of Drosophila such as D. melanogaster, for Z. tuberculatus pupae synapsis is uncommon and tend to pupariate upwards relate to the ground instead of downwards. However, Z. tuberculatus pupae strongly aggregate similar to other Drosophila species.

== Behavior ==
=== Laboratory behavior ===
Zaprionus tuberculatus pupae are difficult to study experimentally because, when space in culture bottles become limited, pupae climb upwards to escape from the bottle and later die. This is true for all species of the genus Zaprionus, except Zaprionus lachaisei.

=== Pupation site selection ===
Though kin selection theory predicts Z. tuberculatus pupae should be more likely to aggregate in an intraspecific manner than interspecifically, Z. tuberculatus does not kin discriminate in site selection.

=== Species recognition ===
"Type 2" songs are sung between two male Z. tuberculatus flies and its function is species recognition.

== Mating ==
=== Male courtship behavior ===
The male Z. tuberculatus generally makes the first contact with the female Z. tuberculatus by grappling at the female, performing mating displays, then auditory display (song singing). The male performs stationary displays from the female Z. tuberculatus rear end at degrees of 90, 180, or 135 along the long axis of the female body. Still while singing, the male Z. tuberculatus then moves radially around the female in a quarter circle. From a further distance from the female compared to the circling display, the male Z. tuberculatus also performs a dancing which interrupts periods of singing or occurs after singing, but never before. Immediately preceding copulation, then for a second time at the beginning of copulation the male Z. tuberculatus also rubs his legs against the abdomen of the female Z. tuberculatus. The average length of Z. tuberculatus copulation is about 2.25 minutes.

==== Male songs ====
Male Z. tuberculatus produces two types of songs by vibrating its wings to generate audio. The two song types are designated either "type 1," which is involved in male courtship, or "type 2," which is used for species recognition both in male and female Z. tuberculatus flies. When one male mounts another, both males sing, possibly to recognize sex or intimidation tactic to deter other males from attempting to mate with the female Z. tuberculatus flies.

=== Female courtship behavior ===
At the conclusion of copulation, female Z. tuberculatus protrudes the abdomen and secreted a colorless liquid, which appears to repulse the male Z. tuberculatus. The chemical composition of the colorless liquid has not been studied.

== Genetics ==
The Z. tuberculatus genome has five rod-shaped chromosomes and one dot-shaped chromosome. The number of type of chromosomes, or the karyotype, for Z. tuberculatus has not changed much throughout evolution, which supports Muller's linkage conservation hypothesis and explains the scarcity of pericentric inversions and translocations.

The transposable element mariner occurs in several species, including the Melanogaster species and in the genus Zaprionus. The presence of mariner in the Z. tuberculatus occurs through horizontal transfer. Mariner is also present in several members of the melanogaster species subgroup. The rate of divergence of the mariner element between the two species subgroups suggests a slower evolution rate of the mariner transposable element. A slowing mariner mutation rate helps to explain low divergence in the melanogaster species subgroup, but fails to account for reduced divergence in Z. tuberculatus. The specific mechanism by which horizontal transfer of mariner occurs for Z.tuberculatus is currently unknown and is being investigated. Similarly, study of the retrosposon copia also revealed evidence supporting horizontal transfer between Z. tuberculatus and the melanogaster species subgroup.

== Interactions with humans ==
Zaprionus tuberculatus is a pest in regions to which it has invaded and infects fruit. Z. tuberculatus is thus capable of negatively impacting fruit which humans eat, but it is unknown which fruit species are most negatively influenced. A close relative of Z. tuberculatus, Z. indianus, is an invasive fly species and a pest to fig orchards. However, the adverse ecological influences of Z. tuberculatus has only recently been investigated directly.
