= Laboratory experiments of speciation =

Biological experiments

A simplification of an allopatric speciation experiment where two lines of fruit flies are raised on maltose and starch media

Laboratory experiments of speciation have been conducted for all four modes of speciation: allopatric, peripatric, parapatric, and sympatric; and various other processes involving speciation: hybridization, reinforcement, founder effects, among others. Most of the experiments have been done on flies, in particular Drosophila fruit flies. However, more recent studies have tested yeasts, fungi, and even viruses.

It has been suggested that laboratory experiments are not conducive to vicariant speciation events (allopatric and peripatric) due to their small population sizes and limited generations. Most estimates from studies of nature indicate that speciation takes hundreds of thousands to millions of years. On the other hand, many species are thought to have speciated faster and more recently, such as the European flounders (Platichthys flesus) that spawn in pelagic and demersal zones—having allopatrically speciated in under 3000 generations.

== Table of experiments ==
Six publications have attempted to compile, review, and analyze the experimental research on speciation:

1. John Ringo, David Wood, Robert Rockwell, and Harold Dowse in 1985;
2. William R. Rice and Ellen E. Hostert in 1993;
3. Ann-Britt Florin and Anders Ödeen in 2002;
4. Mark Kirkpatrick and Virginie Ravigné in 2002;
5. Jerry A. Coyne and H. Allen Orr in 2004; and
6. James D. Fry in 2009.

The table summarizes the studies and data reviewed in these publications. It also references several contemporary experiments and is non-exhaustive. In the table, multiple numbers separated by semi-colons in the generations column indicate that multiple experiments were conducted. The replications (in parentheses) indicates the number of populations used in the experiments—i.e. how many times the experiment was replicated. Various types of selection have been imposed on experimental populations and are indicated by the selection type column. Negative or positive results of each experiment are provided by the reproductive isolation column. Pre-zygotic reproductive isolation means that the reproducing individuals in the populations were unable to produce offspring (effectively a positive result). Post-zygotic isolation means that the reproducing individuals were able to produce offspring but they were either sterile or inviable (a positive result as well). Negative results are indicated by "none"—that is, the experiments did not result in reproductive isolation.

Laboratory experiments of speciation
Species	Trait	Generations (replications) [duration]	Tested	Selection type	Studied genetic drift	Reproductive isolation	Reference	Year
Drosophila melanogaster	Escape response	18	Vicariant, reinforcement, parapatric/ sympatric	Indirect; divergent	Yes	Pre-zygotic	Grant & Mettler	1969
D. melanogaster	Locomotion	112	Vicariant	Indirect; divergent	No	Pre-zygotic	Burnet & Connolly	1974
D. melanogaster	Temperature, humidity	70–130	Vicariant	Indirect; divergent	Yes	Pre-zygotic	Kilias et al.	1980
D. melanogaster	DDT adaptation	600 [25 years, +15 years]	Vicariant	Direct	No	Pre-zygotic	Boake et al.	2003
D. melanogaster		17, 9, 9, 1, 1, 7, 7, 7, 7	Vicariant; parapatric/ sympatric	Direct, divergent		Pre-zygotic in vicariance; none with gene flow	Barker & Karlsson	1974
D. melanogaster		40; 50	Reinforcement	Direct; divergent		Pre-zygotic	Crossley	1974
D. melanogaster	Locomotion	45	Vicariant	Direct; divergent	No	None	van Dijken & Scharloo	1979
D. melanogaster			Reinforcement	Direct; divergent		Pre-zygotic	Wallace	1953
D. melanogaster		36; 31	Reinforcement	Direct; divergent		Pre-zygotic	Knight	1956
D. melanogaster	EDTA adaptation	25, 25, 25, 14	Semi-allopatric, reinforcement	Indirect; divergent	No	Post-zygotic	Robertson	1966
D. melanogaster		25 (8)	Vicariant; reinforcement; parapatric; sympatric	Direct		None	Hostert	1997
D. melanogaster	Abdominal chaeta number	21–31	Vicariant	Direct	Yes	None	Santibanez & Waddington	1958
D. melanogaster	Sternopleural chaeta number	32	Vicariant, reinforcement, parapatric/ sympatric	Direct	No	None	Barker & Cummins	1969
D. melanogaster	Phototaxis, geotaxis	20	Vicariant		No	None	Markow	1975; 1981
D. melanogaster			Peripatric		Yes		Rundle et al.	1998
D. melanogaster			Vicariant; peripatric		Yes		Mooers et al.	1999
D. melanogaster		12	Reinforcement	Divergent		Pre-zygotic	Thoday & Gibson	1962
D. melanogaster						None	Thoday & Gibson	1970; 1971
D. melanogaster		16	Reinforcement	Indirect		None	Spiess & Wilke	1954
D. melanogaster			Reinforcement	Direct; divergent		Pre-zygotic	Ehrman	1971; 1973; 1979; 1983
D. melanogaster	Sternopleural chaeta number	5; 27; 27; 1; 1; 1; 1; 1	Parapatric/ sympatric			None	Chabora	1968
D. melanogaster						None	Scharloo	1967
D. melanogaster		1, 1					Coyne & Grant	1972
D. melanogaster		25					Rice	1985
D. melanogaster		25		Disruptive		Pre-zygotic	Rice & Salt	1988
D. melanogaster		35; 35	Sympatric			Pre-zygotic	Rice & Salt	1990
D. melanogaster	NaCl and CuSO_{4} levels in food	[3 years in allopatry, 1 in sympatry]	Allopatric; reinforcement; sympatric			Pre-zygotic in allopatry, none in sympatry	Wallace	1982
D. melanogaster			Reinforcement				Ehrman et al.	1991
D. melanogaster			Reinforcement				Fukatami & Moriwaki	1970
Drosophila simulans	Scutellar bristles, development speed, wing width; desiccation resistance, fecundity, ethanol resistance; courtship display, re-mating speed, lek behavior; pupation height, clumped egg laying, general activity	[3 years]	Vicariant; peripatric		Yes	Post-zygotic	Ringo et al.	1985
Drosophila paulistorum		131; 131	Reinforcement	Direct		Pre-zygotic	Dobzhansky et al.	1976
D. paulistorum		[5 years]	Vicariant				Dobzhansky and Pavlovsky	1966
Drosophila willistoni	pH adaptation	34–122	Vicariant	Indirect; divergent	No	Pre-zygotic	Kalisz & Cordeiro	1980
Drosophila pseudoobscura	Carbohydrate source	12	Vicariant	Indirect	Yes	Pre-zygotic	Dodd	1989
D. pseudoobscura	Temperature adaptation	25–60	Vicariant	Direct			Ehrman	1964; 1969
D. pseudoobscura	Phototaxis, geotaxis	5–11	Vicariant	Indirect	No	Pre-zygotic	del Solar	1966
D. pseudoobscura			Vicariant; peripatric			Pre-zygotic	Powell	1978; 1985
D. pseudoobscura			Peripatric; vicariant		Yes		Galiana et al.	1993
D. pseudoobscura	Temperature photoperiod; food	37 (78) [33–34 months]	Vicariant	Divergent	Yes	None	Rundle	2003
D. pseudoobscura & Drosophila persimilis		22; 16; 9	Reinforcement	Direct; divergent		Pre-zygotic	Koopman	1950
D. pseudoobscura & D. persimilis		18 (4)		Direct		Pre-zygotic	Kessler	1966
Drosophila mojavensis		12		Direct		Pre-zygotic	Koepfer	1987
D. mojavensis	Development time	13		Divergent	Yes	None	Etges	1998
Drosophila adiastola			Peripatric		Yes	Pre-zygotic	Arita & Kaneshiro	1974
Drosophila silvestris			Peripatric		Yes		Ahearn	1980
Musca domestica	Geotaxis	38	Vicariant	Indirect	No	Pre-zygotic	Soans et al.	1974
M. domestica	Geotaxis	16	Vicariant	Direct; divergent	No	Pre-zygotic	Hurd & Eisenburg	1975
M. domestica			Peripatric		Yes		Meffert & Bryant	1991
M. domestica							Regan et al.	2003
Bactrocera cucurbitae	Development time	40–51		Divergent	Yes	Pre-zygotic	Miyatake & Shimizu	1999
Zea mays		6; 6	Reinforcement	Direct; divergent		Pre-zygotic	Paterniani	1969
Drosophila grimshawi			Peripatric				Jones, Widemo, & Arrendal	N/A
Saccharomyces cerevisiae							Leu & Murry	2006
D. melanogaster			Reinforcement				Harper & Lambert	1983
Tribolium castaneum	Pupal weight	15 (6)		Disruptive			Halliburton & Gall	1983
D. melanogaster	Geotaxis			Divergent			Lofdahl et al.	1992
D. pseudoobscura		[10 years]					Moya et al.	1995
Neurospora				Divergent			Dettman et al.	2008
S. cerevisiae		500		Divergent			Dettman et al.	2007
Sepsis cynipsea		35					Martin & Hosken	2003
D. melanogaster							Wigby & Chapman	2006
D. pseudoobscura	Sexual conflict	48–52 (4; 4; 4)					Bacigalupe et al.	2007
D. serrata							Rundle et al.	2005
Drosophila serrata & D. birchii	Mate recognition	9 (3; 3)	Reinforcement	Natural		Pre-zygotic	Higgie et al.	2000
Enterobacteria phage λ	Escherichia coli receptor exploitation	35 cycles (6)	Vicariant, sympatric			Pre-zygotic	Meyer et al.	2016
Tetranychus urticae	Resistance to host plant toxin						Overmeer	1966
T. urticae	Resistance to host plant toxin						Fry	1999
Helianthus annus × H. petiolaris and H. anomalus			Hybrid				Rieseburg et al.	1996
S. cerevisiae							Greig et al.	2002
D. melanogaster	Life history						Ghosh & Joshi	2012
Drosophila subobscura	Mate behavior						Bárbaro et al.	2015
Digital organisms		~42,000; ~850 (20)	Ecological			Post-zygotic	Anderson & Harmon	2014
Schizosaccharomyces pombe						Complete reproductive isolation	Seike et al.	2015
D. pseudoobscura	Courtship song	130					Debelle et al.	2014
Callosobruchus maculatus		40 (16)					Debelle et al.	2010

== See also ==
- Directed evolution
