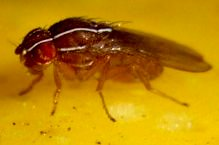
- Zaprionus indianus

Scientific classification
- Kingdom: Animalia
- Phylum: Arthropoda
- Class: Insecta
- Order: Diptera
- Family: Drosophilidae
- Subfamily: Drosophilinae
- Tribe: Drosophilini
- Subtribe: Drosophilina
- Infratribe: Drosophiliti
- Genus: Zaprionus; Coquillett 1902

Type species
- Zaprionus vittiger Coquillett 1902

Subgenera
- Zaprionus; Anaprionus

= Zaprionus =

Genus of flies

The genus Zaprionus belongs to the Drosophilidae family of fruit flies and is positioned within the paraphyletic genus Drosophila. All species are easily recognized by the white longitudinal stripes across the head and thorax. The genus is subdivided in two subgenera, based on the presence of an even (subgenus Zaprionus) or odd (subgenus Anaprionus) number of white stripes. The species of the genus can be found in Africa and Southern Asia. One species, Zaprionus indianus, has invaded the New World.

== Description ==
All species in the genus Zaprionus are easily identified by the longitudinal white stripes bordered by black stripes running across the top of the head and thorax. Species of the subgenus Zaprionus have 4 or 6 white stripes while the species of the subgenus Anaprionus have 5 or 7 white stripes. The general body color varies across species from yellowish to dark brown. Several species of the subgenus Zaprionus have one or more stout and sometimes composite spines on the forelegs.

Eggs of nearly all of subgenus Zaprionus have four respiratory filaments, unlike eggs of most other drosophilids. Those of Z. davidi and subgenus Anaprionus have the normal number of two filaments.

=== Coloration ===
The characteristic black and white 'zebra' stripes of this genus have two different origins. In the simplest form, the white stripes are caused by an absence of the pigment in the cuticle. This mechanism is found in species of the subgenus Anaprionus. The absence of pigmentation also occurs in the species of the subgenus Zaprionus, probably complemented by a separate mechanism. In these species, the white stripes contain many long and bent trichomes (fine outgrowths) that have a groove and contain two cavities, polarizing the light. The black stripes are caused by pigmentation.

== Distribution ==
Members of this genus can be found in the tropics of most continents. The species of the subgenus Zaprionus are found primarily in Africa, while the species of the subgenus Anaprionus are found in Southeast Asia. Two species, Zaprionus ghesquierei and Zaprionus indianus have expanded their range in recent times. Zaprionus ghesquierei has invaded Hawaiʻi, while Zaprionus indianus has expanded its range through the Middle East towards India and more recently crossed the Atlantic Ocean and colonized both South and North America.

== Ecology ==
Zaprionus species are found in a wide array of habitats from semi-deserts to the tropical rain forest. Most species breed on fruits, flowers or decaying tree trunks.

== Taxonomy ==
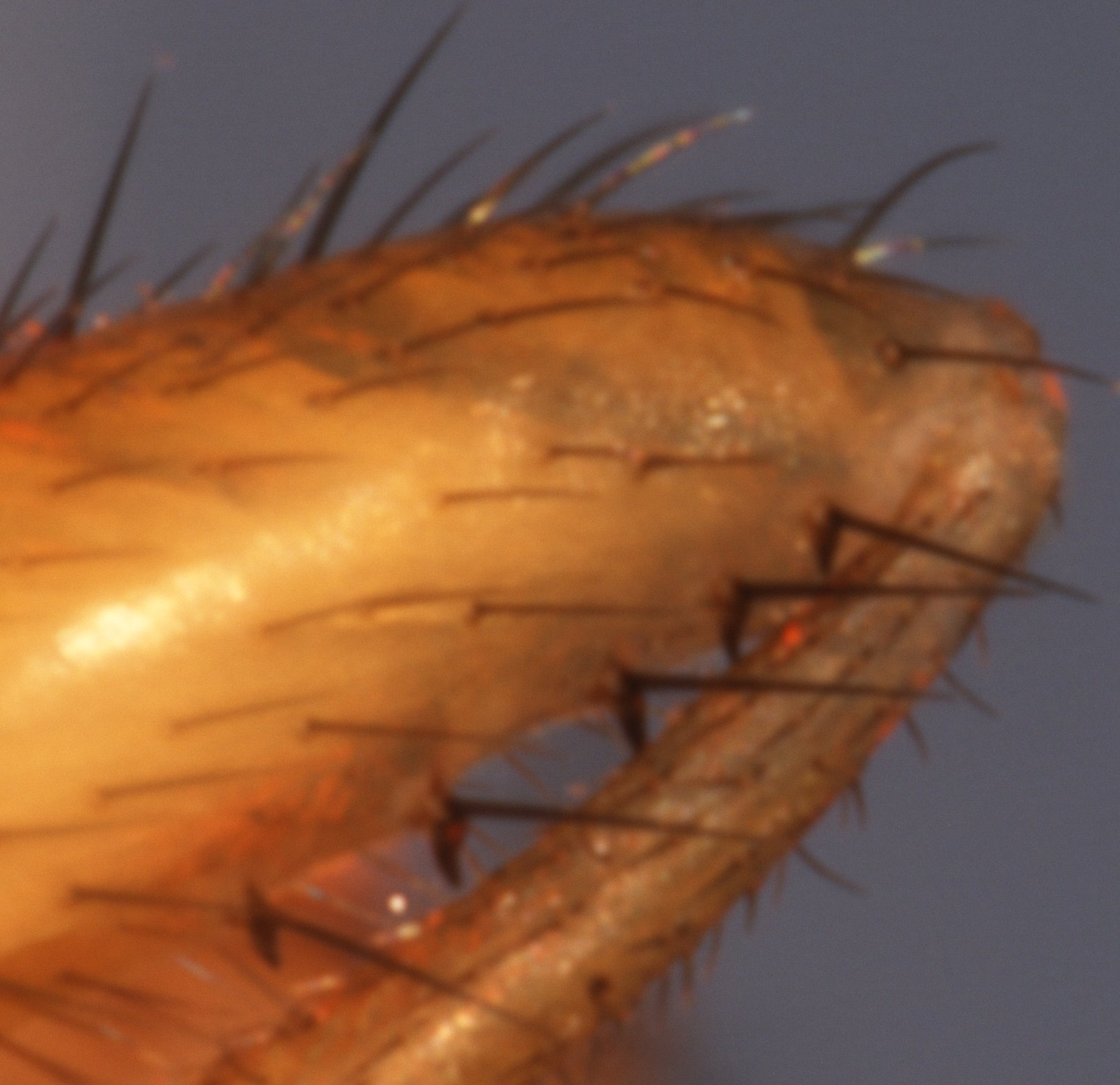
Zaprionus indianus foreleg with composite spines charactertistic for the Zaprionus vittiger species group

The genus Zaprionus was described in 1902 by Daniel William Coquillett. He considered the genus closely related to the genus Drosophila. Molecular studies have confirmed this relationship, and the genus Zaprionus is positioned within the paraphyletic genus Drosophila.

Within the genus, species with an odd number of stripes are assigned to the subgenus Anaprionus, while the species with an even number of stripes are assigned to the subgenus Zaprionus. Species within the subgenus Zaprionus were traditionally subdivided in two species groups, armatus and inermis, based on the presence or absence of special spines on the forelegs. The armatus species group was further subdivided into three species subgroups based on the type of spines. The species of the armatus species subgroup have several normal spines. The single spine on forelegs of the species of the tuberculatus species subgroup consists of a large spine positioned on a tubercle with a smaller spine near the base of the spine. Finally, the species of the vittiger species subgroup had a row of composite spines generally positioned on small tubercles.

Recent molecular studies have shown that this subdivision of the Zaprionus subgenus is incorrect. The ornamentation has evolved multiple times and is not a reliable characteristic for classification. The tuberculatus species group is now part of the group lacking ornamentation (inermis), and the closet relatives of species with a large composite spines are closely related to species without such a spine. The vittiger species subgroup is now a species group and a new species group, neglectus, has been erected for one species placed at the root of the Zaprionus subgenus.

== Species ==
Phylogeny of the genus Drosophila and included genera

- - - - immigrans-tripunctata radiation
      - - - D. quadrilineata species group
          - Samoaia
        - - Zaprionus
          - - D. tumiditarsus species group
            - Liodrosophila
    - Dichaetophora, Hirtodrosophila, Mycodrosophila and Paramycodrosophila
    - - - virilis-repleta radiation and subgenus Siphlodora
      - Hawaiian Drosophilidae
      - D. polychaeta species group
  - Dorsilopha
- Sophophora and included groups

Simplified phylogenetic tree of the genus Drosophila and included genera with a focus on the phylogenetic position of the genus Zaprionus.

The genus Zaprionus consists of the following species:

Subgenus Anaprionus: odd number of whites stripes

- Z. aungsani Wynn and Toda, 1988
- Z. bogoriensis Mainx, 1958)
- Z. cercociliaris Gupta and Gupta, 1991
- Z. flavofasciatus (Takada, Beppu and Toda, 1979)
- Z. lineosus (Walker, 1860)
- Z. multistriatus (Duda, 1923)
- Z. obscuricornis (de Meijere, 1916)
- Z. orissaensis (Gupta, 1972)
- Z. pyinoolwinensis Wynn and Toda, 1988
- Z. silvistriatus (Bock and Baimai, 1967)
- Z. spinilineosus Okada and Carson, 1983
- Z. grandis (Kikkawa and Peng, 1938)

Subgenus Zaprionus: even number of white stripes

- Species group armatus: all species have a simple row of spines.
  - Species subgroup armatus: row of undifferentiated spines
    - Species complex armatus: strong undifferentially oriented spines
      - Z. armatus Collart, 1937
      - Z. enoplomerus Chassagnard, 1988
      - Z. seguyi Tsacas and Chassagnard, 1990
      - Z. spinipes Tsacas and Chassagnard, 1990
      - Z. spinoarmatus Tsacas and Chassagnard, 1990
    - Species complex hoplophorus: strong differentially oriented spines
      - Z. hoplophorus Tsacas and Chassagnard, 1990
      - Z. tuberarmatus Tsacas and Chassagnard, 1990
    - Species complex vrydaghi: fine undifferentially oriented spines, wings with black
      - Z. fumipennis Seguy, 1938
      - Z. vrydaghi Collart, 1937
  - Species subgroup montanus: two opposite oriented spines
    - Z. montanus Collart, 1937
    - Z. campestris Chassagnard, 1988
  - Species subgroup spinosus: row of differentiated spines
    - Z. serratus Chassagnard, 1988
    - Z. spineus Tsacas and Chassagnard, 1990
    - Z. spinosus Collart, 1937
- Species group inermis: zero or one modified spines on foreleg
  - Z. arduus Collart, 1937
  - Z. badyi Burla, 1954
  - Z. ghesquierei Collart, 1937
  - Z. momorticus Graber, 1957
  - Z. niabu Burla, 1954
  - Species subgroup inermis
    - Z. cercus Chassagnard and McEvey, 1992
    - Z. inermis Collart, 1937
  - Species subgroup tuberculatus
    - Z. kolodkinae Chassagnard and Tsacas, 1987
    - Z. mascariensis Tsacas and David, 1975
    - Species complex sepsoides
      - Z. sepsoides Duda, 1939
      - Z. tsacasi Yassin, 2008
    - Species complex tuberculatus
      - Z. burlai Yassin, 2008
      - Z. tuberculatus Malloch, 1932
      - Z. verruca Chassagnard and McEvey, 1992
- Species group neglectus
  - Z. neglectus Collart, 1937
- Species group vittiger: most species have complex spines on the foreleg or two extra stripes over the thorax
  - Species complex davidi
  - Z. davidi Chassagnard and Tsacas, 1993
  - Z. taronus Chassagnard and Tsacas, 1993
  - Species complex indianus
    - Z. africanus Yassin and David, 2010
    - Z. gabonicus Yassin and David, 2010
    - Z. indianus Gupta, 1970
  - Species complex ornatus
    - Z. litos Chassagnard and McEvey, 1992
    - Z. ornatus Seguy, 1933
  - Species complex proximus
    - Z. capensis Chassagnard and Tsacas, 1993
    - Z. proximus Collart, 1937
  - Species complex sexvittatus: two extra stripes over first half of the thorax
    - Z. multivittiger Chassagnard, 1996
    - Z. sexstriatus Chassagnard, 1996
    - Z. sexvittatus Collart, 1937
  - Species complex vittiger
    - Z. camerounensis Chassagnard and Tsacas, 1993
    - Z. koroleu Burla, 1954
    - Z. lachaisei Yassin, 2010
    - Z. santomensis Yassin, 2008
    - Z. vittiger Coquillett, 1901
