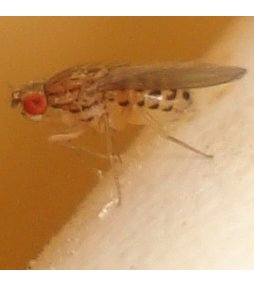

Scientific classification
- Kingdom: Animalia
- Phylum: Arthropoda
- Class: Insecta
- Order: Diptera
- Family: Drosophilidae
- Subfamily: Drosophilinae
- Genus: Drosophila
- Subgenus: Dorsilopha
- Species: D. busckii

Binomial name
- Drosophila busckii Coquillett, 1901

Synonyms
- Drosophila buskii Coquillett, 1901; Drosophila plurilineata Villeneuve, 1911; Drosophila rubrostriata Becker, 1908

= Drosophila busckii =

Species of fly

Drosophila busckii is a species of fruit fly that is native to North America, though it now also occurs in Asia, Europe, Oceania and South America. It can be identified by the presence of dark stripes on the thorax (including a trident shape on the mesonotum) and the wings being transparent with no markings. Mostly it is associated with rotten potatoes. In the laboratory they are normally reared on Wheeler-Clayton food.
