= Drosophila appendiculata =

Scientific classification
- Kingdom: Animalia
- Phylum: Arthropoda
- Class: Insecta
- Order: Diptera
- Family: Drosophilidae
- Subfamily: Drosophilinae
- Genus: Drosophila
- Subgenus: Chusqueophila; Brncic, 1957
- Species: D. appendiculata

Binomial name
- Drosophila appendiculata Malloch, 1934

Species of fly

Drosophila appendiculata is a large yellowish fruitfly found in Southern Chile and neighboring Argentina. The species is placed in its own unique subgenus, Chusqueophila, based on the presence of three partial cross-veins in the wing.

== Etymology ==
The name Chusqueophila is based on the fact that this species is often found in vegetation dominated by the bamboos of the genus Chusquea.

== Taxonomy ==
This species is placed in its own subgenus (Chusqueophila) in the genus Drosophila based on the unique wing characteristics but further affinities are poorly understood.

== Description ==
Artist rendering of a typical wing of Drosophila appendiculata. Red asterisk (*) indicates partial cross veins.

Drosophila appendiculata was described by Malloch in 1934 and is distinguished from all other Drosophila species by the three characteristic partial cross-veins on the fourth long vein that intrude into the space between the fourth and fifth long vein. One of these partial cross veins is between the posterior cross vein and the tip of the wing while the other two partial cross veins originate from the fourth long vein between the posterior and anterior cross veins. The wing is transparent, with brownish clouding around the cross veins, including the partial cross veins, and the tip/front of the wing. The flies are generally yellowish-brown with a slightly darker thorax and small black triangle on the tergites of the abdomen. With a size of 5 to 5.5 mm, this species is relative large for the genus Drosophila. The egg have four filaments.

== Distribution ==
The species is found between La Serena and Aisén, Chile, and neighboring Argentina. This is further south than any other native Chilean species.

== Ecology ==
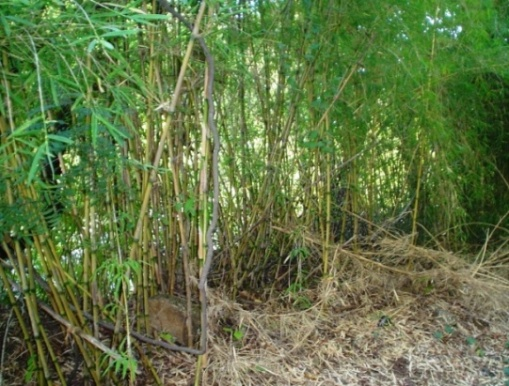
Chusquea culeou, one the bamboo species dominating the habitat of this species

The species is found in vegetation along rivers and lakes, especially when the vegetation is rich in bamboo species of the genus Chusquea. Wild-caught females will lay eggs on standard laboratory food, but rearing the species in the laboratory has been unsuccessful.
