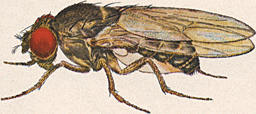
- Drosophila pseudoobscura

Scientific classification
- Kingdom: Animalia
- Phylum: Arthropoda
- Clade: Pancrustacea
- Class: Insecta
- Order: Diptera
- Family: Drosophilidae
- Subfamily: Drosophilinae
- Genus: Drosophila; Fallén, 1823

Type species
- Musca funebris Fabricius, 1787

Subgenera
- Chusqueophila; Dorsilopha; Drosophila; Dudaica; Phloridosa; Psilodorha; Siphlodora; Sophophora

Synonyms
- Oinopota Kirby & Spence, 1815

= Drosophila =

Genus of flies

Drosophila (/drəˈsɒfɪlə, drɒ-, droʊ-/; from Ancient Greek δρόσος, drósos, 'dew' and φίλος, phílos, 'loving') is a genus of fly, belonging to the family Drosophilidae, whose members are often called "small fruit flies" or pomace flies, vinegar flies, or wine flies, a reference to the characteristic of many species to linger around overripe or rotting fruit. They should not be confused with the Tephritidae, a related family, which are also called fruit flies (sometimes referred to as "true fruit flies").

One species of Drosophila in particular, Drosophila melanogaster, has been heavily used in research in genetics and is a common model organism in developmental biology. The terms "fruit fly" and "Drosophila" are often used synonymously with D. melanogaster in modern biological literature. The entire genus, however, contains more than 1,500 species and is very diverse in appearance, behavior, and breeding habitat.

== Etymology ==
The term "Drosophila", meaning "dew-loving", is a modern scientific Latin adaptation from Greek words δρόσος, drósos, "dew", and φίλος, phílos, "loving".

== Morphology ==
Drosophila species are small flies, typically pale yellow to reddish brown to black, with red eyes. When the eyes (essentially a film of lenses) are removed, the brain is revealed. Drosophila brain structure and function develop and age significantly from larval to adult stage. Developing brain structures make these flies a prime candidate for neuro-genetic research. According to a study published in Nature in October 2024, by the scientists examining the brain of an adult female Drosophila, the shape and location of each of its 130,000 neurons and 50 million synapses were identified. In this study, the most detailed analysis ever conducted on the brain of an adult animal is represented. Many species, including the noted Hawaiian picture-wings, have distinct black patterns on the wings. The plumose (feathery) arista, bristling of the head and thorax, and wing venation are characters used to diagnose the family. Most are small, about 2–4 millimetres (0.079–0.157 in) long, but some, especially many of the Hawaiian species, are larger than a house fly.

== Evolution ==
=== Detoxification mechanisms ===
Environmental challenge by natural toxins helped to prepare Drosophilae to detox DDT, by shaping the glutathione S-transferase mechanism that metabolizes both.

=== Selection ===
The Drosophila genome is subject to a high degree of selection, especially unusually widespread negative selection compared to other taxa. A majority of the genome is under selection of some sort, and a supermajority of this is occurring in non-coding DNA.

Effective population size has been credibly suggested to positively correlate with the effect size of both negative and positive selection. Recombination is likely to be a significant source of diversity. There is evidence that crossover is positively correlated with polymorphism in Drosophila populations.

== Biology ==
=== Habitat ===
Drosophila species are found all around the world, with more species in the tropical regions. Drosophila made their way to the Hawaiian Islands and radiated into over 800 species. They can be found in deserts, tropical rainforest, cities, swamps, and alpine zones. Some northern species hibernate. The northern species D. montana is the best cold-adapted, and is primarily found at high latitudes or high altitudes. Most species breed in various kinds of decaying plant and fungal material, including fruit, bark, slime fluxes, flowers, and mushrooms. Drosophila species that are fruit-breeding are attracted to various products of fermentation, especially ethanol and methanol. Fruits exploited by Drosophila species include those with a high pectin concentration, which is an indicator of how much alcohol will be produced during fermentation. Citrus, morinda, apples, pears, plums, and apricots belong into this category.

Fruit fly feeding on a rotting orange

The larvae of at least one species, D. suzukii, can also feed in fresh fruit and can sometimes be a pest. A few species have switched to being parasites or predators. Many species can be attracted to baits of fermented bananas or mushrooms, but others are not attracted to any kind of baits. Males may congregate at patches of suitable breeding substrate to compete for the females, or form leks, conducting courtship in an area separate from breeding sites.

Several Drosophila species, including D. melanogaster, D. immigrans, and D. simulans, are closely associated with humans, and are often referred to as domestic species. These and other species (D. subobscura, and from a related genus Zaprionus indianus) have been accidentally introduced around the world by human activities such as fruit transports.

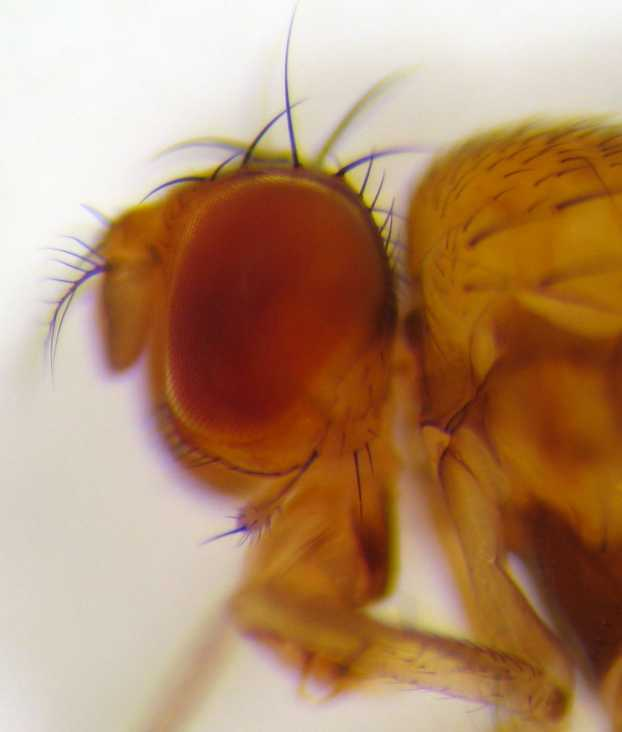
Side view of head showing characteristic bristles above the eye

=== Reproduction ===
Males of this genus are known to have the longest sperm cells of any studied organism on Earth, including one species, D. bifurca, that has sperm cells that are 58 mm (2.3 in) long. The cells mostly consist of a long, thread-like tail, and are delivered to the females in tangled coils. The other members of the genus Drosophila also make relatively few giant sperm cells, with that of D. bifurca being the longest. D. melanogaster sperm cells are a more modest 1.8 mm long, although this is still about 35 times longer than a human sperm. Several species in the D. melanogaster species group are known to mate by traumatic insemination.

Drosophila species vary widely in their reproductive capacity. Those such as D. melanogaster that breed in large, relatively rare resources have ovaries that mature 10–20 eggs at a time, so that they can be laid together on one site. Others that breed in more-abundant but less nutritious substrates, such as leaves, may only lay one egg per day. The eggs have one or more respiratory filaments near the anterior end; the tips of these extend above the surface and allow oxygen to reach the embryo. Larvae feed not on the vegetable matter itself, but on the yeasts and microorganisms present on the decaying breeding substrate. Development time varies widely between species (between 7 and more than 60 days) and depends on the environmental factors such as temperature, breeding substrate, and crowding.

During metamorphosis, Drosophila pupa develops an internal lipid barrier that protects against dehydration. Unlike adult fruit flies which have a hydrocarbon coating on their outer body surface, the pupal barrier is located beneath the cuticle and consists of long hydrocarbons. These hydrocarbons are produced by specialized cells during the larval stage and stored in the larva's fat reserves until needed during pupation. Research published in 2026 identified an elongase enzyme involved in producing these hydrocarbons. Under high-temperature and low-humidity conditions, removing this enzyme nearly doubled dehydration in pupae, reaching levels incompatible with survival.

Fruit flies lay eggs in response to environmental cycles. Eggs laid at a time (such as night) during which likelihood of survival is greater than in eggs laid at other times (such as day) yield more larvae than eggs that were laid at those times. Ceteris paribus, the habit of laying eggs at this 'advantageous' time would yield more surviving offspring, and more grandchildren, than the habit of laying eggs during other times. This differential reproductive success would cause D. melanogaster to adapt to environmental cycles, because this behavior has a major reproductive advantage.

Their median lifespan is 35–45 days.

Lifecycle of Drosophila

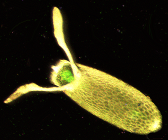
Egg

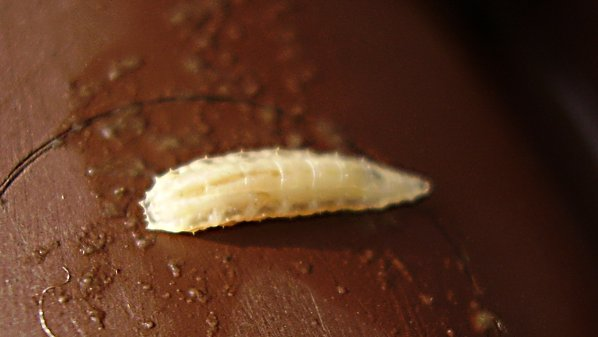
Larva

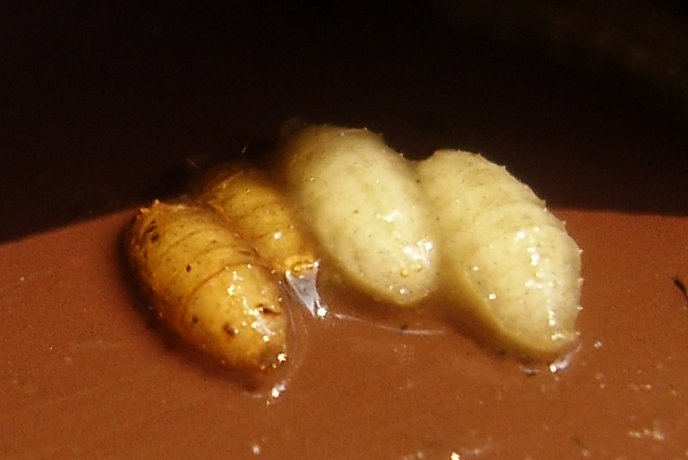
Pupae (brown specimens are older than the white ones)

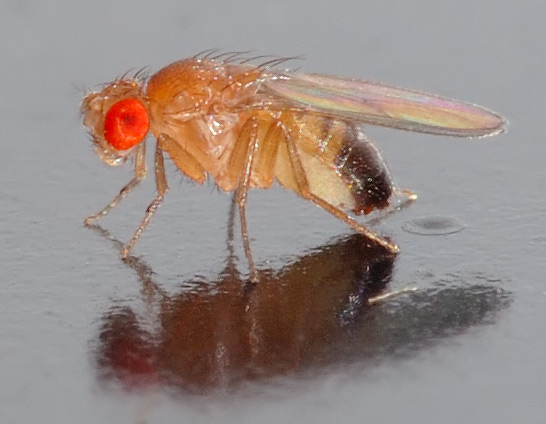
Adult D. melanogaster

=== Aging ===
DNA damage accumulates in Drosophila intestinal stem cells with age. Deficiencies in the Drosophila DNA damage response, including deficiencies in expression of genes involved in DNA damage repair, accelerates intestinal stem cell (enterocyte) aging. Sharpless and Depinho reviewed evidence that stem cells undergo intrinsic aging and speculated that stem cells grow old, in part, as a result of DNA damage.

=== Mating systems ===
==== Courtship behavior ====
The following is based on D. simulans and D. melanogaster.

Courtship behavior of male Drosophila is an attractive behaviour. Females respond via their perception of the behavior portrayed by the male. Male and female Drosophila use a variety of sensory cues to initiate and assess courtship readiness of a potential mate. The cues include the following behaviours: positioning, pheromone secretion, following females, making tapping sounds with legs, singing, wing spreading, creating wing vibrations, genitalia licking, bending the stomach, attempt to copulate, and the copulatory act itself. The songs of D. melanogaster and D. simulans have been studied extensively. These luring songs are sinusoidal in nature and vary within and between species.

The courtship behavior of D. melanogaster has also been assessed for sex-related genes, which have been implicated in courtship behavior in both the male and female. Recent experiments explore the role of fruitless (fru) and doublesex (dsx), a group of sex-behaviour linked genes.

The fruitless (fru) gene in Drosophila helps regulate the network for male courtship behavior; when a mutation to this gene occurs altered same sex sexual behavior in males is observed. Male Drosophila with the fru mutation direct their courtship towards other males as opposed to typical courtship, which would be directed towards females. Loss of the fru mutation leads back to the typical courtship behavior.

==== Pheromones ====
A novel class of pheromones was found to be conserved across the subgenus Drosophila in 11 desert dwelling species. These pheromones are triacylglycerides that are secreted exclusively by males from their ejaculatory bulb and transferred to females during mating. The function of the pheromones is to make the females unattractive to subsequent suitors and thus inhibit courtship by other males.

==== Polyandry ====
The following section is based on the following Drosophila species: D. serrata, D. pseudoobscura, D. melanogaster, and D. neotestacea. Polyandry is a prominent mating system among Drosophila. Females mating with multiple sex partners has been a beneficial mating strategy for Drosophila. The benefits include both pre and post copulatory mating. Pre-copulatory strategies are the behaviours associated with mate choice and the genetic contributions, such as production of gametes, that are exhibited by both male and female Drosophila regarding mate choice. Post copulatory strategies include sperm competition, mating frequency, and sex-ratio meiotic drive.

These lists are not inclusive. Polyandry among the D. pseudoobscura in North America vary in their number of mating partners. There is a connection between the number of time females choose to mate and chromosomal variants of the third chromosome. It is believed that the presence of the inverted polymorphism is why re-mating by females occurs. The stability of these polymorphisms may be related to the sex-ratio meiotic drive.

However, for D. subobscura, the main mating system is monandry, not normally seen in Drosophila.

==== Sperm competition ====
The following section is based on the following Drosophila species: D. melanogaster, D. simulans, and D. mauritiana. Sperm competition is a process that polyandrous Drosophila females use to increase the fitness of their offspring. The female Drosophila has two sperm storage organs, the spermathecae and seminal receptacle, that allows her to choose the sperm that will be used to inseminate her eggs. However, some species of Drosophila have evolved to only use one or the other. Females have little control when it comes to cryptic female choice. Female Drosophila through cryptic choice, one of several post-copulatory mechanisms, which allows for the detection and expelling of sperm that reduces inbreeding possibilities. Manier et al. (2013) has categorized the post copulatory sexual selection of D. melanogaster, D. simulans, and D. mauritiana into the following three stages: insemination, sperm storage, and fertilizable sperm. Among the preceding species there are variations at each stage that play a role in the natural selection process. This sperm competition has been found to be a driving force in the establishment of reproductive isolation during speciation.

==== Parthenogenesis and gynogenesis ====
Parthenogenesis does not occur in D. melanogaster, but in the gyn-f9 mutant, gynogenesis occurs at low frequency. The natural populations of D. mangebeirai are entirely female, making it the only obligate parthenogenetic species of Drosophila. Parthenogenesis is facultative in parthenogenetica and mercatorum.

=== Laboratory-cultured animals ===
D. melanogaster is a popular experimental animal because it is easily cultured en masse out of the wild, has a short generation time, and mutant animals are readily obtainable. In 1906, Thomas Hunt Morgan began his work on D. melanogaster and reported his first finding of a white eyed mutant in 1910 to the academic community. He was in search of a model organism to study genetic heredity and required a species that could randomly acquire genetic mutation that would visibly manifest as morphological changes in the adult animal. His work on Drosophila earned him the 1933 Nobel Prize in Medicine for identifying chromosomes as the vector of inheritance for genes. This and other Drosophila species are widely used in studies of genetics, embryogenesis, chronobiology, speciation, neurobiology, and other areas.

However, some species of Drosophila are difficult to culture in the laboratory, often because they breed on a single specific host in the wild. For some, it can be done with particular recipes for rearing media, or by introducing chemicals such as sterols that are found in the natural host; for others, it is (so far) impossible. In some cases, the larvae can develop on normal Drosophila lab medium, but the female will not lay eggs; for these it is often simply a matter of putting in a small piece of the natural host to receive the eggs.

The Drosophila Species Stock Center located at Cornell University in Ithaca, New York, maintains cultures of hundreds of species for researchers.

==== Use in genetic research ====
Drosophila is considered one of the most valuable genetic model organisms; both adults and embryos are used in experiments. Compared to vertebrate model animals, they reproduce faster and are easier to keep. Drosophilia is also easy to study genetically due to its low number of chromosomes and the large number of mutations that can produce easily-visible variations in appearance. Genetic traits can be studied through different Drosophila lineages, and the findings can be applied to deduce genetic trends in humans. Using Drosophilia, Thomas Hunt Morgan discovered that genes are found on chromosomes and greatly refined Mendel's theory of inheritance. These rules apply to many organisms, including humans.

The fly has approximately 15,500 genes on its four chromosomes, whereas humans have about 22,000 genes among their 23 chromosomes. As much as 75% of human disease-producing genes have counterparts (orthologs) in Drosophilia, making it useful for studying many diseases.

Drosophila is a useful in vivo tool to analyze Alzheimer's disease. Rhomboid proteases were first detected in Drosophila but then found to be highly conserved across eukaryotes, mitochondria, and bacteria. Melanin's ability to protect DNA against ionizing radiation has been most extensively demonstrated in Drosophila, including in the formative study by Hopwood et al. in 1985.

=== Microbiome ===
Like other animals, Drosophila is associated with various bacteria in its gut. The fly gut microbiota or microbiome seems to have a central influence on Drosophila fitness and life history characteristics. The microbiota in the gut of Drosophila represents an active current research field.

Drosophila species also harbour vertically transmitted endosymbionts, such as Wolbachia and Spiroplasma. These endosymbionts can act as reproductive manipulators, such as cytoplasmic incompatibility induced by Wolbachia or male-killing induced by the D. melanogaster Spiroplasma poulsonii (named MSRO). The male-killing factor of the D. melanogaster MSRO strain was discovered in 2018, solving a decades-old mystery of the cause of male-killing. This represents the first bacterial factor that affects eukaryotic cells in a sex-specific fashion, and is the first mechanism identified for male-killing phenotypes. Alternatively, they may protect theirs hosts from infection. Drosophila Wolbachia can reduce viral loads upon infection, and is explored as a mechanism of controlling viral diseases (for example, dengue fever) by transferring these Wolbachia to disease-vector mosquitoes. The S. poulsonii strain of Drosophila neotestacea protects its host from parasitic wasps and nematodes using toxins that preferentially attack the parasites instead of the host.

Since the Drosophila species is one of the most used model organisms, it was vastly used in genetics. However, the effect abiotic factors, such as temperature, has on the microbiome on Drosophila species has recently been of great interest. Certain variations in temperature have an impact on the microbiome. It was observed that higher temperatures (31 °C (88 °F)) lead to an increase of Acetobacter populations in the gut microbiome of D. melanogaster as compared to lower temperatures (13 °C (55 °F)). In low temperatures, the flies were more cold resistant and also had the highest concentration of Wolbachia.

The microbiome in the gut can also be transplanted among organisms. It was found that D. melanogaster became more cold-tolerant when the gut microbiota from D. melanogaster that were reared at low temperatures. This depicted that the gut microbiome is correlated to physiological processes.

Moreover, the microbiome plays a role in aggression, immunity, egg-laying preferences, locomotion and metabolism. As for aggression, it plays a role to a certain degree during courtship. It was observed that germ-free flies were not as competitive compared to the wild-type males. Microbiome of the Drosophila species is also known to promote aggression by octopamine OA signalling. The microbiome has been shown to impact these fruit flies' social interactions, specifically aggressive behaviour that is seen during courtship and mating.

=== Predators ===
Drosophila species are prey for many generalist predators, such as robber flies. In Hawaii, the introduction of yellowjackets from mainland United States has led to the decline of many of the larger species. The larvae are preyed on by other fly larvae, staphylinid beetles, and ants.

=== Neurochemistry ===
Fruit flies use several fast-acting neurotransmitters, similar to those found in humans, which allow neurons to communicate and coordinate behavior. Acetylcholine, glutamate, gamma-aminobutyric acid (GABA), dopamine, serotonin, and histamine are all neurotransmitters that can be found in humans, but Drosophila also have another neurotransmitter, octopamine, the analog of norepinephrine. Acetylcholine is the primary excitatory neurotransmitter and GABA is the primary inhibitory neurotransmitter utilized in the drosophila central nervous system. In Drosophila, the effects of many neurotransmitters can vary depending on the receptors and signaling pathways involved, allowing them to act as excitatory or inhibitory signals under different contexts. This versatility enables complex neural processing and behavioral flexibility.

Glutamate can serve as an excitatory neurotransmitter, specifically at the neuromuscular junction in fruit flies. This differs from vertebrates, where acetylcholine is used at these junctions.

In Drosophila, histamine primarily functions as a neurotransmitter in the visual system. It is released by photoreceptor cells to transmit visual information from the eye to the brain, making it essential for vision.

As with many eukaryotes, Drosophila express SNAREs, and as with several others the components of the SNARE complex are known to be somewhat substitutable: Although the loss of SNAP-25 - a component of neuronal SNAREs - is lethal, SNAP-24 can fully replace it. For another example, an R-SNARE not normally found in synapses can substitute for synaptobrevin.

=== Immunity ===
The Spätzle protein is a ligand of Toll. In addition to melanin's more commonly known roles in the endoskeleton and in neurochemistry, melanization is one step in the immune responses to some pathogens. Dudzic et al. (2019) additionally find a large number of shared serine protease messengers between Spätzle/Toll and melanization and a large amount of crosstalk between these pathways.

== Systematics ==
Phylogeny

- - - - immigrans-tripunctata radiation
      - - - D. quadrilineata species group
          - Samoaia
        - - Zaprionus
          - - D. tumiditarsus species group
            - Liodrosophila
    - - Dichaetophora
      - Hirtodrosophila
      - - Mycodrosophila
        - Paramycodrosophila
    - - - virilis-repleta radiation (in part)
        - - subgenus Siphlodora
          - virilis-repleta radiation (in part)
      - - Hawaiian Drosophila
        - Scaptomyza
      - D. polychaeta species group
  - Dorsilopha
- - Old World Sophophora
  - - New World Sophophora
    - Lordiphosa
    - Hirtodrosophila duncani

Based on an amalgamation of O'Grady & Deselle (2008) and Remsen & O'Grady (2002). Some groupings are not reproduced using phylogenomic (1000-locus) data.

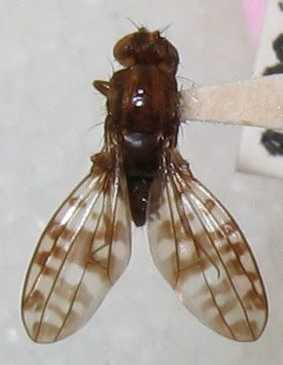
D. setosimentum, a species of Hawaiian picture-wing fly

The genus Drosophila as currently defined is paraphyletic (see below) and contains 1,450 described species, while the total number of species is estimated at thousands. The majority of the species are members of two subgenera: Drosophila (about 1,100 species) and Sophophora (including D. (S.) melanogaster; around 330 species).

The Hawaiian species of Drosophila (estimated to be more than 500, with roughly 380 species described) are sometimes recognized as a separate genus or subgenus, Idiomyia, but this is not widely accepted. About 250 species are part of the genus Scaptomyza, which arose from the Hawaiian Drosophila and later recolonized continental areas.

Evidence from phylogenetic studies suggests these genera arose from within the genus Drosophila:

- Liodrosophila Duda, 1922
- Mycodrosophila Oldenburg, 1914
- Samoaia Malloch, 1934
- Scaptomyza Hardy, 1849
- Zaprionus Coquillett, 1901
- Zygothrica Wiedemann, 1830
- Hirtodrosophila Duda, 1923

Several of the subgeneric and generic names are based on anagrams of Drosophila, including Dorsilopha, Lordiphosa, Siphlodora, Phloridosa, and Psilodorha.

== Genetics ==
Drosophila species are extensively used as model organisms in genetics (including population genetics), cell biology, biochemistry, and especially developmental biology. Therefore, extensive efforts are made to sequence drosophilid genomes. The genomes of these species were (nearly) fully sequenced by 2010:

- Drosophila (Sophophora) melanogaster
- Drosophila (Sophophora) simulans
- Drosophila (Sophophora) sechellia
- Drosophila (Sophophora) yakuba
- Drosophila (Sophophora) erecta
- Drosophila (Sophophora) ananassae
- Drosophila (Sophophora) pseudoobscura
- Drosophila (Sophophora) persimilis
- Drosophila (Sophophora) willistoni
- Drosophila (Drosophila) mojavensis
- Drosophila (Drosophila) virilis
- Drosophila (Drosophila) grimshawi

The data have been used for many purposes, including evolutionary genome comparisons. D. simulans and D. sechellia are sister species, and provide viable offspring when crossed, while D. melanogaster and D. simulans produce infertile hybrid offspring. The Drosophila genome is often compared with the genomes of more distantly related species such as the honeybee Apis mellifera or the mosquito Anopheles gambiae.

The Drosophila modEncode project conducted extensive work to annotate Drosophila genomes, profile transcripts, histone modifications, transcription factors, regulatory networks, and other aspects of Drosophila genetics, and make predictions about gene expression among others.

FlyBase serves as a centralized database of curated genomic data on Drosophila.

The Drosophila 12 Genomes Consortium has presented in 2007 ten new genomes and combines those with previously released genomes for D. melanogaster and D. pseudoobscura to analyse the evolutionary history and common genomic structure of the genus. This includes the discovery of transposable elements (TEs) and illumination of their evolutionary history. Bartolomé et al. (2009) find at least 1/3 of the TEs in D. melanogaster, D. simulans and D. yakuba have been acquired by horizontal transfer. They find an average rate of 0.035 horizontal transfer events per TE family per million years. Bartolomé also finds horizontal transfer of TEs follows other relatedness metrics, with transfer events between D. melanogaster and D. simulans being twice as common as either of them with D. yakuba.

The list of Drosophilia species with (nearly) fully sequenced genomes has continued to grow. As of March 2026, the NCBI Genomes page lists 626 genome assemblies under the genus, 254 of which are considered reference and 91 of which are annotated. A considerable amount of the growth can be attributed to the improvement of sequencing technologies: a 2024 work presenting 183 de novo single-fly genomes of 173 species reported a cost of $150 per sample and was completed by a single laboratory, compared to the massive international effort required for the 2007 Consortium effort involving 100 labs across 16 countries.

The genomes for already-sequenced species are under continuous improvement. For example, release 6 of the D. melanogaster (strain ISO-1) reference genome from 2015 "effectively exhausts clone-based technologies for mapping and sequencing", producing numerous corrections compared to the previous release. Repetitive sequences remain a gap to be closed by future long-read sequencing techniques. In 2024, a near-complete "telomere-to-telomere" genome assembly was produced for D. melanogaster strain Canton S, closing 93.28% of gaps in the release 6 genome.

== See also ==
- Drosophila hybrid sterility
- Laboratory experiments of speciation
- List of Drosophila species
- Caenorhabditis 'Drosophilae' species supergroup, a group of species generally found on rotten fruits and transported by Drosophila flies
- The Making of a Fly, a 1992 non-fiction book that is an early example of algorithmic tacit collusion resulting in an extremely inflated price
