= Psilodorha =

Scientific classification
- Domain: Eukaryota
- Kingdom: Animalia
- Phylum: Arthropoda
- Class: Insecta
- Order: Diptera
- Family: Drosophilidae
- Subfamily: Drosophilinae
- Genus: Drosophila
- Subgenus: Psilodorha; Okada, 1968

Species
- Drosophila ancora; Drosophila toyohii

Subgenus of Drosophila flies

Psilodorha is a subgenus of the genus Drosophila.
