= Phloridosa =

Scientific classification
- Domain: Eukaryota
- Kingdom: Animalia
- Phylum: Arthropoda
- Class: Insecta
- Order: Diptera
- Family: Drosophilidae
- Subfamily: Drosophilinae
- Genus: Drosophila
- Subgenus: Phloridosa; Sturtevant, 1942

Species
- Drosophila alei; Drosophila alfari; Drosophila cuzcoica; Drosophila denieri; Drosophila lutzii; Drosophila merzi; Drosophila tristani

Subgenus of Drosophila flies

Phloridosa is a subgenus of the genus Drosophila.
