= Drosophila bifurca =

Scientific classification
- Domain: Eukaryota
- Kingdom: Animalia
- Phylum: Arthropoda
- Class: Insecta
- Order: Diptera
- Family: Drosophilidae
- Genus: Drosophila
- Species: D. bifurca

Binomial name
- Drosophila bifurca Patterson and Wheeler, 1942

Species of fly

Drosophila bifurca is a species of fruit fly. Males of this species are known to have the longest sperm cells of any organism on Earth—5.8 cm long when uncoiled, over twenty times the entire body length of the male.

The cells are mostly tail, and are delivered to the females in tangled coils. A male can only make a few hundred such cells during his lifetime. The other members of the genus Drosophila also make very few, giant sperm cells, with D. bifurca's being the longest. The sperm cells are produced in testes 6.7 cm long, which comprise 11% of the male's body mass. Males of the species become sexually mature 17 days after emergence, instead of 7 days for females, which suggests testes development is costly in time and energy.

Such sperm gigantism is thought to have evolved via a Fisherian runaway process, with a genetic link between sperm length and the length of the female seminal receptacle (sperm-storage organ) length, combined with an increasing competitive advantage of longer sperm as the seminal receptacle evolves to be longer.
