= Microdrosophila quadrata =

Scientific classification
- Domain: Eukaryota
- Kingdom: Animalia
- Phylum: Arthropoda
- Class: Insecta
- Order: Diptera
- Family: Drosophilidae
- Genus: Microdrosophila
- Species: M. quadrata

Binomial name
- Microdrosophila quadrata (Sturtevant, 1916)

Synonyms
- Drosophila quadrata Sturtevant, 1916

Species of fly

Microdrosophila quadrata is a species of vinegar flies, insects in the family Drosophilidae.
