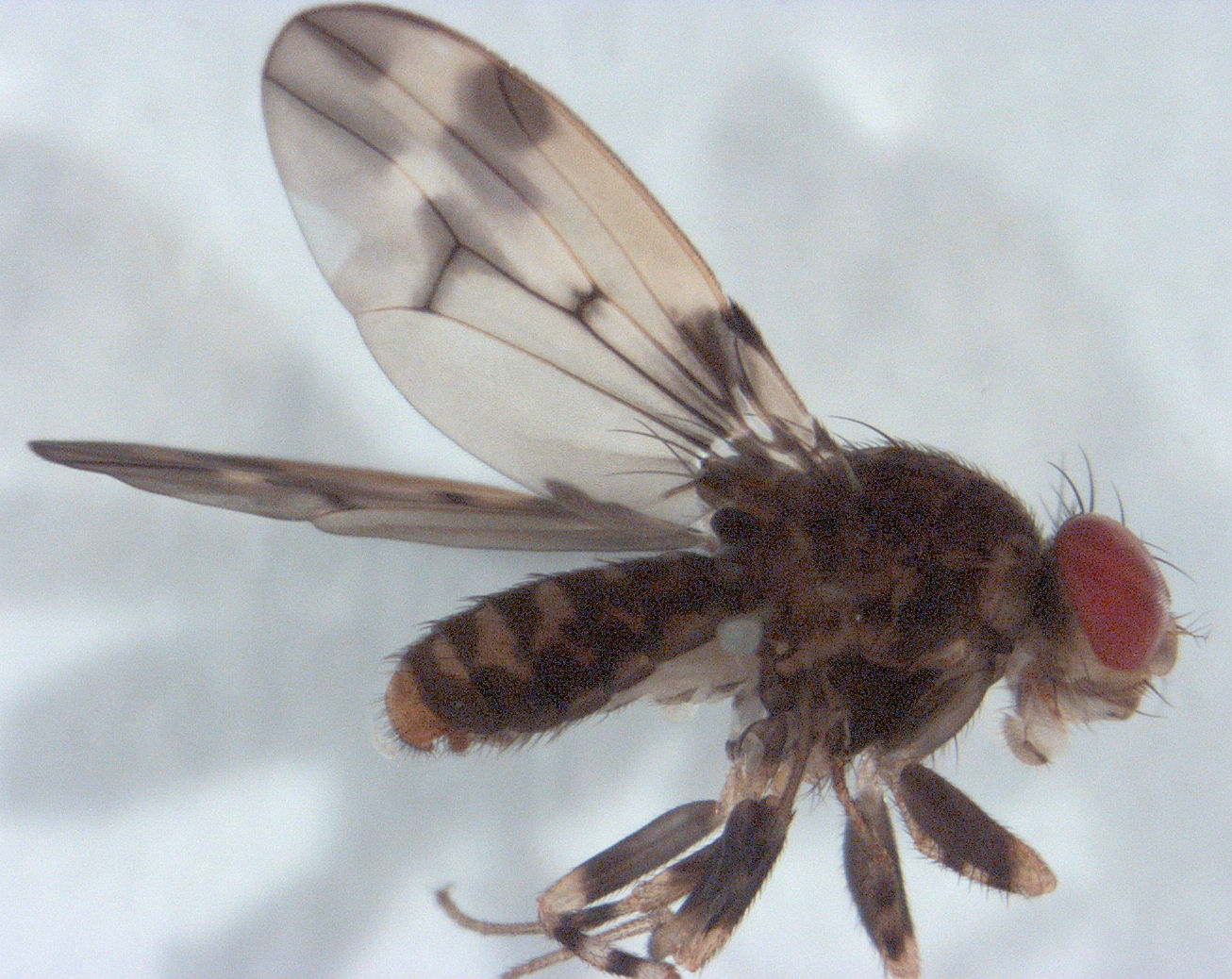
- Adult male Scaptodrosophila n.sp. nr fumida

Scientific classification
- Kingdom: Animalia
- Phylum: Arthropoda
- Class: Insecta
- Order: Diptera
- Family: Drosophilidae
- Subfamily: Drosophilinae
- Genus: Scaptodrosophila

= Scaptodrosophila =

Genus of flies

Scaptodrosophila is a genus of flies of the family Drosophilidae.

== Species ==
- Scaptodrosophila abdita
- Scaptodrosophila aclinata
- Scaptodrosophila acuta
- Scaptodrosophila adelphe
- Scaptodrosophila adyukru
- Scaptodrosophila agamse
- Scaptodrosophila akaju
- Scaptodrosophila albifrontata
- Scaptodrosophila albolimbata
- Scaptodrosophila altera
- Scaptodrosophila alternata
- Scaptodrosophila ambiguifascia
- Scaptodrosophila amydriae
- Scaptodrosophila anderssoni
- Scaptodrosophila angelicae
- Scaptodrosophila angusta
- Scaptodrosophila anthemon
- Scaptodrosophila anthia
- Scaptodrosophila anuda
- Scaptodrosophila anyi
- Scaptodrosophila aproclinata
- Scaptodrosophila aterrima
- Scaptodrosophila atricha
- Scaptodrosophila aurochaeta
- Scaptodrosophila bambuphila
- Scaptodrosophila bangi
- Scaptodrosophila bansadharae
- Scaptodrosophila barkeri
- Scaptodrosophila baseogrisea
- Scaptodrosophila bella
- Scaptodrosophila bicolor
- Scaptodrosophila bodmeri
- Scaptodrosophila brincki
- Scaptodrosophila brooksae
- Scaptodrosophila brunnea
- Scaptodrosophila brunneipennis
- Scaptodrosophila brunnotata
- Scaptodrosophila bryani
- Scaptodrosophila bushi
- Scaptodrosophila caledobrunnea
- Scaptodrosophila caledonica
- Scaptodrosophila caliginosa
- Scaptodrosophila cancellata
- Scaptodrosophila cederholmi
- Scaptodrosophila chandraprabhiana
- Scaptodrosophila chocolata
- Scaptodrosophila claropleura
- Scaptodrosophila claytoni
- Scaptodrosophila clunicrus
- Scaptodrosophila collessi
- Scaptodrosophila cominsiae
- Scaptodrosophila compressiceps
- Scaptodrosophila concolor
- Scaptodrosophila coniura
- Scaptodrosophila convexa
- Scaptodrosophila coracina
- Scaptodrosophila cristata
- Scaptodrosophila crocata
- Scaptodrosophila crockeri
- Scaptodrosophila cultello
- Scaptodrosophila decipiens
- Scaptodrosophila deflexa
- Scaptodrosophila diana
- Scaptodrosophila dibi
- Scaptodrosophila dichromos
- Scaptodrosophila divergens
- Scaptodrosophila dorsata
- Scaptodrosophila dorsocentralis
- Scaptodrosophila ebenea
- Scaptodrosophila ebonata
- Scaptodrosophila ehrmanae
- Scaptodrosophila elenthiensis
- Scaptodrosophila ellenae
- Scaptodrosophila eluta
- Scaptodrosophila elutoides
- Scaptodrosophila enigma
- Scaptodrosophila eoundo
- Scaptodrosophila evanescens
- Scaptodrosophila evenhuisi
- Scaptodrosophila excavata
- Scaptodrosophila excepta
- Scaptodrosophila exemplar
- Scaptodrosophila fimbriata
- Scaptodrosophila finitima
- Scaptodrosophila finnigana
- Scaptodrosophila flavipes
- Scaptodrosophila flavissima
- Scaptodrosophila framire
- Scaptodrosophila fringefera
- Scaptodrosophila fumida
- Scaptodrosophila fungi
- Scaptodrosophila fuscithorax
- Scaptodrosophila fuscopalpis
- Scaptodrosophila fuscovittata
- Scaptodrosophila garnetensis
- Scaptodrosophila garumga
- Scaptodrosophila glauca
- Scaptodrosophila gressitti
- Scaptodrosophila grossfieldi
- Scaptodrosophila hamptoni
- Scaptodrosophila heliconiae
- Scaptodrosophila hibisci
- Scaptodrosophila hirsuata
- Scaptodrosophila horaeogaster
- Scaptodrosophila horrifica
- Scaptodrosophila howensis
- Scaptodrosophila hypopygialis
- Scaptodrosophila incisurifrons
- Scaptodrosophila inconspicua
- Scaptodrosophila infuscata
- Scaptodrosophila inornata
- Scaptodrosophila insolita
- Scaptodrosophila jackeyi
- Scaptodrosophila jucunda
- Scaptodrosophila kennedyi
- Scaptodrosophila kirki
- Scaptodrosophila kohimaensis
- Scaptodrosophila koraputae
- Scaptodrosophila krishnamurthyi
- Scaptodrosophila kyushuensis
- Scaptodrosophila lagomorpha
- Scaptodrosophila lambi
- Scaptodrosophila lampra
- Scaptodrosophila lateralis
- Scaptodrosophila laterolinea
- Scaptodrosophila latifascia
- Scaptodrosophila latifasciaeformis
- Scaptodrosophila latifasciola
- Scaptodrosophila latifshahi
- Scaptodrosophila lativittata
- Scaptodrosophila lebanonensis
- Scaptodrosophila lobata
- Scaptodrosophila louisae
- Scaptodrosophila loxostyla
- Scaptodrosophila lugens
- Scaptodrosophila lurida
- Scaptodrosophila magna
- Scaptodrosophila mania
- Scaptodrosophila marginata
- Scaptodrosophila marjoryae
- Scaptodrosophila mbettie
- Scaptodrosophila medleri
- Scaptodrosophila megagenys
- Scaptodrosophila meijerei
- Scaptodrosophila melaena
- Scaptodrosophila melanopleura
- Scaptodrosophila merdae
- Scaptodrosophila metanthia
- Scaptodrosophila metatarsalis
- Scaptodrosophila metaxa
- Scaptodrosophila minima
- Scaptodrosophila minimeta
- Scaptodrosophila minnamurrae
- Scaptodrosophila mirei
- Scaptodrosophila moana
- Scaptodrosophila moenae
- Scaptodrosophila mokonfim
- Scaptodrosophila momortica
- Scaptodrosophila moronu
- Scaptodrosophila mossmana
- Scaptodrosophila mulgravei
- Scaptodrosophila multipunctata
- Scaptodrosophila mundagensis
- Scaptodrosophila nannosoma
- Scaptodrosophila nausea
- Scaptodrosophila neomedleri
- Scaptodrosophila neozelandica
- Scaptodrosophila nicholsoni
- Scaptodrosophila nicolae
- Scaptodrosophila nigrescens
- Scaptodrosophila nigriceps
- Scaptodrosophila nigrifrons
- Scaptodrosophila nigrofemorata
- Scaptodrosophila nigrops
- Scaptodrosophila nimia
- Scaptodrosophila nitidithorax
- Scaptodrosophila norfolkensis
- Scaptodrosophila notha
- Scaptodrosophila novamaculosa
- Scaptodrosophila novoguineensis
- Scaptodrosophila nublada
- Scaptodrosophila nuda
- Scaptodrosophila obsoleta
- Scaptodrosophila oenops
- Scaptodrosophila oncera
- Scaptodrosophila oralis
- Scaptodrosophila oreibatis
- Scaptodrosophila oresibios
- Scaptodrosophila oweni
- Scaptodrosophila ovidenticulata
- Scaptodrosophila oviminiatus
- Scaptodrosophila palauana
- Scaptodrosophila pallidipes
- Scaptodrosophila parabrunnea
- Scaptodrosophila paracentralis
- Scaptodrosophila paraclubata
- Scaptodrosophila paracultello
- Scaptodrosophila paraguma
- Scaptodrosophila paranthia
- Scaptodrosophila paraphryniae
- Scaptodrosophila parapsychotriae
- Scaptodrosophila parapunctipennis
- Scaptodrosophila paratriangulata
- Scaptodrosophila paratriangulifer
- Scaptodrosophila parsonsi
- Scaptodrosophila parviramosa
- Scaptodrosophila peniquadrata
- Scaptodrosophila phryniae
- Scaptodrosophila pictipennis
- Scaptodrosophila pilicrus
- Scaptodrosophila pilopalpus
- Scaptodrosophila plaua
- Scaptodrosophila pleurolineata
- Scaptodrosophila pleurovittata
- Scaptodrosophila plumata
- Scaptodrosophila precaria
- Scaptodrosophila pressobrunnea
- Scaptodrosophila pseudoebenea
- Scaptodrosophila psychotriae
- Scaptodrosophila pugionata
- Scaptodrosophila pumilio
- Scaptodrosophila puncteluta
- Scaptodrosophila puncticeps
- Scaptodrosophila puriensis
- Scaptodrosophila pusio
- Scaptodrosophila pygmaea
- Scaptodrosophila quadriradiata
- Scaptodrosophila quadristriata
- Scaptodrosophila rhabdote
- Scaptodrosophila rhinos
- Scaptodrosophila rhypara
- Scaptodrosophila riverata
- Scaptodrosophila rufifrons
- Scaptodrosophila rufuloventer
- Scaptodrosophila saba
- Scaptodrosophila samoaensis
- Scaptodrosophila scaptomyzoidea
- Scaptodrosophila scutellaris
- Scaptodrosophila scutellimargo
- Scaptodrosophila scutellopilosa
- Scaptodrosophila senufo
- Scaptodrosophila setaria
- Scaptodrosophila setifera
- Scaptodrosophila silvalineata
- Scaptodrosophila simplex
- Scaptodrosophila sinape
- Scaptodrosophila singularis
- Scaptodrosophila smicra
- Scaptodrosophila spathicola
- Scaptodrosophila specensis
- Scaptodrosophila specensoides
- Scaptodrosophila spinifrons
- Scaptodrosophila spinomelana
- Scaptodrosophila stramineipes
- Scaptodrosophila strigifrons
- Scaptodrosophila subacuticornis
- Scaptodrosophila subeluta
- Scaptodrosophila subminima
- Scaptodrosophila subnitida
- Scaptodrosophila subtilis
- Scaptodrosophila sumatrensis
- Scaptodrosophila sydneyensis
- Scaptodrosophila thodayi
- Scaptodrosophila throckmortoni
- Scaptodrosophila triangulifer
- Scaptodrosophila tricingulata
- Scaptodrosophila triseta
- Scaptodrosophila uebe
- Scaptodrosophila valeana
- Scaptodrosophila variata
- Scaptodrosophila varipes
- Scaptodrosophila vazrae
- Scaptodrosophila victoria
- Scaptodrosophila vindicta
- Scaptodrosophila xanthops
- Scaptodrosophila xanthorrhoeae
- Scaptodrosophila xiphiochaeta
- Scaptodrosophila zebrina
- Scaptodrosophila zingiphila
- Scaptodrosophila zophera
