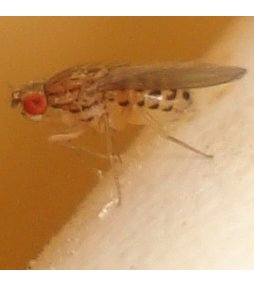
- Drosophila busckii

Scientific classification
- Kingdom: Animalia
- Phylum: Arthropoda
- Clade: Pancrustacea
- Class: Insecta
- Order: Diptera
- Family: Drosophilidae
- Subfamily: Drosophilinae
- Genus: Drosophila
- Subgenus: Dorsilopha; Sturtevant, 1942

Type species
- Drosophila busckii Coquillett, 1901

Species
- Drosophila busckii; Drosophila confertidentata; Drosophila linearidentata; Drosophila neobusckii

= Dorsilopha =

Subgenus of insects

The subgenus Dorsilopha belongs to genus Drosophila and consists of four species. The phylogenetic position of this group has been unclear for a long time, but recent studies have shown that the subgenus is positioned ancestral to the subgenus Drosophila.

== Species ==
- Drosophila busckii Coquillett, 1901
- Drosophila confertidentata Zhang, Li and Feng, 2006
- Drosophila linearidentata Toda, 1986
- Drosophila neobusckii Toda, 1986
