= Drosophila serrata =

Scientific classification
- Kingdom: Animalia
- Phylum: Arthropoda
- Clade: Pancrustacea
- Class: Insecta
- Order: Diptera
- Family: Drosophilidae
- Genus: Drosophila
- Species: D. serrata

Binomial name
- Drosophila serrata Malloch, 1927

Synonyms
- Drosophila sattalensis

Species of fly

Drosophila serrata is a species of fruit fly in the genus Drosophila, described by Malloch in 1927.

It is endemic to Australia.
