= Drosophila ananassae =

Scientific classification
- Kingdom: Animalia
- Phylum: Arthropoda
- Class: Insecta
- Order: Diptera
- Family: Drosophilidae
- Genus: Drosophila
- Species: D. ananassae

Binomial name
- Drosophila ananassae Doleschall, 1858

Species of fly

Drosophila ananassae is a species of fruit fly that is a useful model organism for genetic studies because it is easily cultured in the laboratory, and was one of 12 fruitfly genomes sequenced for a large comparative study.

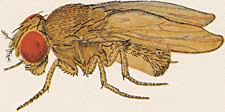
Drosophila ananassae - Female
