= Microdrosophila =

Scientific classification
- Kingdom: Animalia
- Phylum: Arthropoda
- Class: Insecta
- Order: Diptera
- Family: Drosophilidae
- Subfamily: Drosophilinae
- Genus: Microdrosophila; Malloch, 1921

Genus of flies

Microdrosophila is a genus of vinegar flies, insects in the family Drosophilidae. There are at least 70 described species in Microdrosophila.

== Species ==
These 76 species belong to the genus Microdrosophila:

- Microdrosophila acristata Okada, 1968^{c g}
- Microdrosophila bamanpuriensis Upadhyay & Singh, 2007^{c g}
- Microdrosophila bicornua Okada, 1985^{c g}
- Microdrosophila bilineata Kumar & Gupta, 1990^{c g}
- Microdrosophila bimaculata (Meijere, 1908)^{c g}
- Microdrosophila bipartita Zhang, 1989^{c g}
- Microdrosophila bullata Takada & Momma, 1975^{c g}
- Microdrosophila chejuensis Lee & Kim, 1990^{c g}
- Microdrosophila chinsurae De & Gupta, 1994^{c g}
- Microdrosophila chuii Chen, 1994^{c g}
- Microdrosophila conda Zhang, 1989^{c g}
- Microdrosophila congesta (Zetterstedt, 1847)^{c g}
- Microdrosophila conica Okada, 1985^{c g}
- Microdrosophila convergens (Malloch, 1934)^{c}
- Microdrosophila cristata Okada, 1960^{c g}
- Microdrosophila cucullata Zhang, 1989^{c g}
- Microdrosophila curvula Zhang, 1989^{c g}
- Microdrosophila dentata Zhang, 1989^{c g}
- Microdrosophila discrepantia Bock, 1982^{c g}
- Microdrosophila distincta Wheeler & Takada, 1964^{c g}
- Microdrosophila duplicristata Okada, 1985^{c g}
- Microdrosophila elongata Okada, 1965^{c g}
- Microdrosophila falciformis Chen & Toda, 1994^{c g}
- Microdrosophila filamentea Okada, 1985^{c g}
- Microdrosophila frontata (Meijere, 1916)^{c g}
- Microdrosophila furcata Okada, 1988^{c g}
- Microdrosophila fuscata Okada, 1960^{c g}
- Microdrosophila gangtokensis Gupta & Gupta, 1991^{c g}
- Microdrosophila gangwonensis Kim & Joo, 2002^{c g}
- Microdrosophila hasta Bock, 1982^{c g}
- Microdrosophila honoghensis Zhang, 1989^{c g}
- Microdrosophila jarrae Bock, 1982^{c g}
- Microdrosophila korogo Burla, 1954^{c g}
- Microdrosophila laticlavia Wheeler & Kambysellis, 1966^{c g}
- Microdrosophila latifrons Okada, 1965^{c g}
- Microdrosophila luchunensis Zhang, 1989^{c g}
- Microdrosophila mabi Burla, 1954^{c g}
- Microdrosophila macroctenia Okada, 1988^{c g}
- Microdrosophila maculata Okada, 1960^{c g}
- Microdrosophila magniflava Zhang, 1989^{c g}
- Microdrosophila mamaru (Burla, 1954)^{c g}
- Microdrosophila marginata Okada, 1966^{c g}
- Microdrosophila matsudairai Okada, 1960^{c g}
- Microdrosophila neodistincta Sundaran & Gupta, 1990^{c g}
- Microdrosophila nigripalpis Okada, 1966^{c g}
- Microdrosophila nigrispina Okada, 1985^{c g}
- Microdrosophila nigrohalterata Okada, 1966^{c g}
- Microdrosophila ochracella Wheeler & Takada, 1964^{c g}
- Microdrosophila paradistincta De & Gupta, 1994^{c g}
- Microdrosophila pauciramosa Okada, 1966^{c g}
- Microdrosophila pectinata Okada, 1966^{c g}
- Microdrosophila peniciliata De & Gupta, 1994^{c g}
- Microdrosophila philippina Okada, 1985^{c g}
- Microdrosophila pleurolineata Wheeler & Takada, 1964^{c g}
- Microdrosophila pseudopleurolineata Okada, 1968^{c g}
- Microdrosophila purpurata Okada, 1956^{c g}
- Microdrosophila quadrata (Sturtevant, 1916)^{i c g b}
- Microdrosophila residua Bock, 1982^{c g}
- Microdrosophila rhoparia Okada, 1985^{c g}
- Microdrosophila sagittatusa Chen, 1994^{c g}
- Microdrosophila sarawakana Okada, 1985^{c g}
- Microdrosophila serrata Okada, 1985^{c g}
- Microdrosophila setulosa Zhang, 1989^{c g}
- Microdrosophila sexsetosa (Duda, 1939)^{c g}
- Microdrosophila sikkimensis Kumar & Gupta, 1990^{c g}
- Microdrosophila spiciferipennis Zhang, 1989^{c g}
- Microdrosophila submarginata Okada, 1965^{c g}
- Microdrosophila suvae Wheeler & Kambysellis, 1966^{c g}
- Microdrosophila tabularis Zhang, 1989^{c g}
- Microdrosophila takadai Bock, 1982^{c g}
- Microdrosophila tecifrons (Meijere, 1914)^{g}
- Microdrosophila tectifrons (Meijere, 1914)^{c g}
- Microdrosophila urashimae Okada, 1960^{c g}
- Microdrosophila virajpetiensis Sundaran & Gupta, 1990^{c g}
- Microdrosophila vittata Okada, 1985^{c g}
- Microdrosophila zetterstedti Wheeler, 1959^{c g}

Data sources: i = ITIS, c = Catalogue of Life, g = GBIF, b = Bugguide.net
