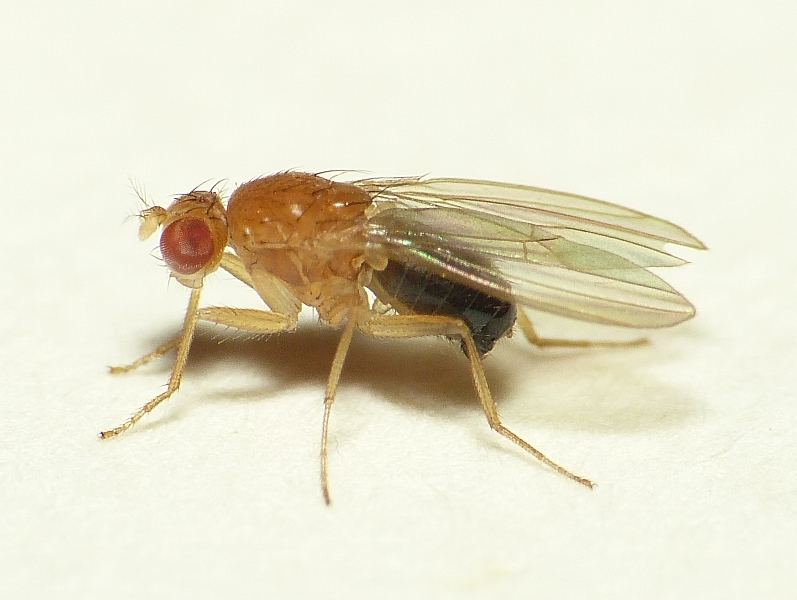
- Lordiphosa andalusiaca Netherlands

Scientific classification
- Kingdom: Animalia
- Phylum: Arthropoda
- Class: Insecta
- Order: Diptera
- Family: Drosophilidae
- Genus: Lordiphosa
- Species: L. andalusiaca

Binomial name
- Lordiphosa andalusiaca (Strobl, 1906)

Synonyms
- Drosophila andalusiaca Strobl, 1906; Drosophila forcipata Collin, 1952

= Lordiphosa andalusiaca =

Species of fly

Lordiphosa andalusiaca is a species of fly in the family Drosophilidae. It is found in the Palearctic.
