= Drosophila hybrid sterility =

The concept of a biological species as a group of organisms capable of interbreeding to produce viable offspring dates back to at least the 18th century, although it is often associated today with Ernst Mayr. Species of the fruit-fly Drosophila are one of the most commonly used organisms in evolutionary research, and have been used to test many theories related to the evolution of species. The genus Drosophila comprises numerous species that have varying degrees of premating and postmating isolation (including hybrid sterility) between them. These species are useful for testing hypotheses of the reproductive mechanisms underlying speciation.

== Historical background ==
Working in the early 20th century T.H. Morgan, was the first to use Drosophila to explore heredity. Primarily on the basis of work with D. melanogaster, Morgan and his colleagues C.B. Bridges, A.H. Sturtevant, and H.J. Mueller developed a chromosome theory of heredity, for which Morgan was awarded a Nobel Prize in 1933. Their experiments consisted of cross-breeding Drosophila mutants and documenting offspring. Another highly regarded figure in Drosophila research was Theodosius Dobzhansky, who invented the use of genetic markers and used them to study hybrid sterility between Drosophila pseudoobscura and Drosophila persimilis. This experimental method has been used for many years.

== Sex determination in Drosophila ==
The genome of D. melanogaster, has been sequenced and studied in fine detail. It is now known that Drosophila has 6 chromosomes—an X/Y pair and four autosomal chromosomes. The genome comprises about 139.5 million base pairs. There are about 15,000 genes.

Sex is determined in Drosophila not by the presence or absence of the Y chromosome as in mammals, but by the ratio of X chromosomes to autosomes.

== Experimentation ==
In the off-spring of crosses between Drosophila simulans and its island derivative Drosophila mauritiana, female hybrids are fertile but male hybrids are sterile. Recent studies have shown that a critical gene for gender determination in Drosophila known as the sex-lethal gene is highly misregulated in D. melanogaster and D. simulans hybrids, compared with the degree of misregulation of non-sex biased genes studied. The sex-lethal gene is often abnormally expressed in male hybrids from D. melanogaster mothers as a result of re-localization of the male-specific complex to the X chromosome, which contributes to the male sterility. Abnormalities in sperm array were found in very few individuals during their larval stage, meaning that disruptions in spermatogenesis most likely occur during later stages in life.

Experiments involving crosses between D. pseudoananassae and D. bipectinata, D. pseudoananassae and D. parabipectinata, and D. pseudoananassae and D. malerkotliana have further shown that the Y chromosome has a role in hybrid male sterility. The possible interactions of Y chromosome are X-Y, Y-autosome and Y-cytoplasm. The sterile males carry a set of conspecific autosomes to the Y chromosome, which results in fertility because of the Y-dominant autosome interactions. Therefore, Y-autosome interactions are ruled out in this type of hybrid sterility.

Since cytoplasmic factors can be compatible between these species, such factors are also dismissed as the cause of sterility.

However, in Drosophila paulistorum there is information suggesting that if Y chromosome and cytoplasm are from different parents, the male is usually sterile. X-Y interactions are the most likely cause of sterility in male hybrids. It has been shown that interbreeding organisms that have more genetic compatibilities have less disruption of spermatogenesis and normal sized testes, while species who are less genetically compatible have a higher disruption in spermatogenesis and generally have atrophied testes.

Another possible cause of sterility among species in which presence or absence of one or the other sex chromosome determines gender, is if one sex chromosome of one species has recessive alleles interacting with autosomal alleles of the mating species. This could cause the heterogametic sex chromosome in the hybrid to be inviable or sterile, but homogametic sex chromosome will be fertile. Consequently, in species where presence or absence of a Y chromosome determines gender, for instance, individuals carrying XY chromosomes (males) will be sterile and those carrying XX (females) will be fertile. This is closely related to Haldane's rule.

It has also been shown that microbial infections of invertebrates can cause modification of the gender and fertility of host's off-spring. For instance, infections of nematodes or of arthropods, including Drosophila, species of the rickettsial bacteria Wolbachia can produce a male-specific sterility, which is congenital by means of transmission through the female line.

== Controversy ==
Experiments have led scientists to believe that many observations recorded in laboratories neglect existing polymorphism factors in hybrid sterility due to crossing parents from non-isofemale lines, as well as possibly underestimating actual degrees of sterility caused by inaccurate measures of motility. Failure to account for potential polymorphism could lead to misinterpretation of the scale on which hybrid sterility occurs.
