= Drosophila grimshawi =

Scientific classification
- Kingdom: Animalia
- Phylum: Arthropoda
- Class: Insecta
- Order: Diptera
- Family: Drosophilidae
- Genus: Drosophila
- Species: D. grimshawi

Binomial name
- Drosophila grimshawi Oldenberg, 1914

Synonyms
- Idiomyia grimshawi

Species of fly

Drosophila grimshawi is a species of fruit fly from Hawaii, and was one of 12 fruit fly genomes sequenced for a large comparative study.
