= Drosophila polychaeta species group =

Scientific classification
- Kingdom: Animalia
- Phylum: Arthropoda
- Class: Insecta
- Order: Diptera
- Family: Drosophilidae
- Genus: Drosophila
- Subgenus: Drosophila
- Species group: polychaeta

Species
- Drosophila asper Lin and Tseng, 1971; Drosophila daruma Okada, 1956; Drosophila hirtipes Lamb, 1914; Drosophila polychaeta Patterson and Wheeler, 1942

Species group of fruit flies

The Drosophila polychaeta species group is a species group of fruit flies in the subgenus Drosophila.
