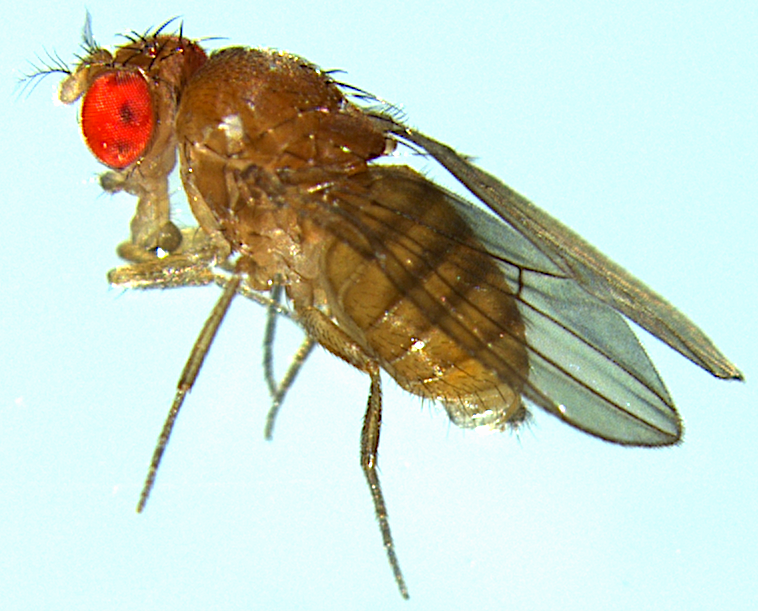
- A D. willistoni female
- Illustration of a D. willistoni male

Scientific classification
- Kingdom: Animalia
- Phylum: Arthropoda
- Class: Insecta
- Order: Diptera
- Family: Drosophilidae
- Genus: Drosophila
- Species: D. willistoni

Binomial name
- Drosophila willistoni (Sturtevant, 1916)

Synonyms
- Sophophora willistoni

= Drosophila willistoni =

Species of fly

Drosophila willistoni is a species of fruit fly. It was originally described by Alfred Sturtevant in 1916. It ranges from Florida, Mexico and Caribbean islands southwards to Argentina and is the most common Drosophilid fruit fly in the Amazon rainforest.

This fruitfly is widely used for scientific research, including genetic research.
