= Siphlodora =

Scientific classification
- Domain: Eukaryota
- Kingdom: Animalia
- Phylum: Arthropoda
- Class: Insecta
- Order: Diptera
- Family: Drosophilidae
- Genus: Drosophila
- Subgenus: Siphlodora; Patterson and Mainland, 1944

Type species
- Drosophila sigmoides Loew, 1872

Species
- Drosophila flexa; Drosophila sigmoides

Type of fruit fly

The subgenus Siphlodora belongs to genus Drosophila and consists of two species that share a sigmoid-shaped posterior crossvein. Phylogenetically, the subgenus is positioned within the virilis-repleta radiation.
