= Drosophila mojavensis =

- Drosophila mojavensis - Female

Scientific classification
- Kingdom: Animalia
- Phylum: Arthropoda
- Clade: Pancrustacea
- Class: Insecta
- Order: Diptera
- Family: Drosophilidae
- Genus: Drosophila
- Species: D. mojavensis

Binomial name
- Drosophila mojavensis Patterson et al., 1940

Species of fly

Drosophila mojavensis is a cactophilic species of fruit fly from the southwestern United States and Mexico, and was one of 12 fruitfly genomes sequenced for a large comparative study.
