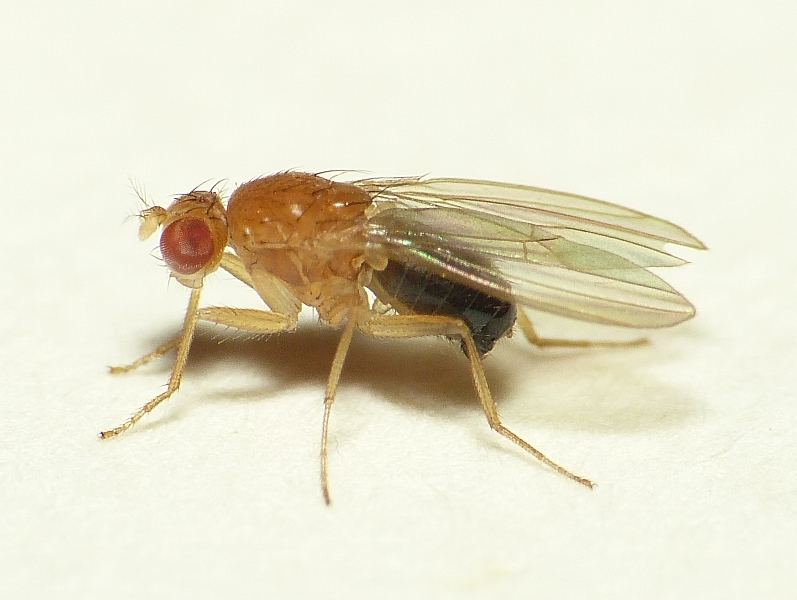
- Lordiphosa andalusiaca

Scientific classification
- Kingdom: Animalia
- Phylum: Arthropoda
- Class: Insecta
- Order: Diptera
- Family: Drosophilidae
- Subfamily: Drosophilinae
- Genus: Lordiphosa; Basden, 1961

= Lordiphosa =

Genus of flies

Lordiphosa is a genus of fly in the family Drosophilidae.

== Species ==
- L. acongruens (Zhang & Liang, 1992)
- L. acuminata (Collin, 1952)
- L. alticola Hu, Watabe & Toda, 1999
- L. andalusiaca (Strobl, 1906)
- L. antillaria (Okada, 1984)
- L. archoroides (Zhang, 1993)
- L. baechlii Zhang, 2008
- L. basdeni (Wheeler, 1957)
- L. biconvexa (Zhang & Liang, 1992)
- L. chaoi Hu & Toda, 1999
- L. chaolipinga (Okada, 1984)
- L. clarofinis (Lee, 1959)
- L. coei (Okada, 1966)
- L. collinella (Okada, 1968)
- L. cultrata Zhang, 1993
- L. denticeps (Okada & Sasakawa, 1956)
- L. deqenensis Zhang, 1993
- L. eminens Quan & Zhang, 2003
- L. falsiramula Zhang, 1993
- L. fenestrarum (Fallén, 1823)
- L. gruicollara Quan & Zhang, 2003
- L. harpophallata Hu, Watabe & Toda, 1999
- L. hexasticha (Papp, 1971)
- L. himalayana (Gupta & Gupta, 1991)
- L. hirsuta (Duda, 1926)
- L. incidens Quan & Zhang, 2003
- L. kurokawai (Okada, 1971)
- L. ludianensis Quan & Zhang, 2001
- L. macai Zhang, 2008
- L. megalopectinata (Takada, Makino, Momma & Suzuki, 1953)
- L. miki (Duda, 1924)
- L. mommai (Takada & (Okada, 1960)
- L. neokurokawai (Singh & Gupta, 1981)
- L. nigricolor (Strobl, 1898)
- L. nigrifemur Quan & Zhang, 2001
- L. nigrocolor (Patterson & Wheeler, 1949)
- L. nigrostyla (Okada, 1988)
- L. paradenticeps (Okada, 1971)
- L. paraflabella Gupta & De, 1996
- L. parantillaria (Kumar & Gupta, 1990)
- L. penicilla (Zhang, 1993)
- L. penicula (Okada, 1984)
- L. peniglobosa (Kumar & Gupta, 1990)
- L. piliferous Quan & Zhang, 2003
- L. porrecta (Okada, 1984)
- L. protrusa (Zhang & Liang, 1992)
- L. ramipara (Zhang & Liang, 1992)
- L. ramosissima (Zhang & Liang, 1992)
- L. ramula Zhang, 1993
- L. ripa (Okada, 1966)
- L. serriflabella (Okada, 1966)
- L. shennongjiana Hu & Toda, 1999
- L. shii Quan & Zhang, 2001
- L. spinopenicula (Okada, 1988)
- L. stackelbergi (Duda, 1935)
- L. subantillaria (Okada, 1984)
- L. tripartita (Okada, 1966)
- L. tsacasi Zhang, 2008
- L. variopicta (Becker, 1908)
- L. vittata Zhang & Liang, 1994
- L. zonaria (Okada, 1966)
