= Bialba =

Scientific classification
- Kingdom: Animalia
- Phylum: Arthropoda
- Class: Insecta
- Order: Diptera
- Family: Drosophilidae
- Genus: Bialba; Bock, 1989
- Species: B. rotunda

Binomial name
- Bialba rotunda Bock, 1989

Genus and species of fly

Bialba rotunda is a species of fly belonging to the family Drosophilidae. The species, which is the sole member of the genus Bialba, was originally described from a specimen obtained in Queensland, Australia.

== Etymology ==
The generic name comes from the Latin words for "two" and "white." The specific name, rotunda, is Latin for "round."

== Taxonomy ==
The holotype of B. rotunda was collected near Mt. Tozer in the Iron Range on a collecting expedition conducted by the CSIRO Division of Entomology in the summer of 1986 and was described, along with its genus, by Ian R. Bock in 1989.

== Description ==
Bialba sport feathery arista with lateral white bands and orbital bristles on the posterior half of the front, as well as a single vibrissa. The mesonotum is shiny and dark with six rows of acrostichal bristles along the top and two pairs of dorsocentral bristles alongside them. The scutellum is bulbous and a similar color to the mesonotum, with two pairs of macrochaetae but no setae. The wings of Bialba have a weak anal vein, and the discal and second basal cells of the wing are confluent.

B. rotunda is 2.1 mm long with each wing measuring 1.8 mm. Its distinguishing feature is its white frontal bands flowing on to the antennae. The head is orange-tan between these bands, which taper toward the back of the head, leaving small, dark, triangular areas on either side of the head where the orbital bristles are located. The second segment of the antenna is tan along the middle and white on the sides, and the third segment is snowy white. The face is dirty tan. The mesonotum, scutellum, pleura, and abdomen are brownish-black with metallic tinges. The haltere is pale tan, and the legs are brownish and darkest at the femora.

== Distribution and habitat ==
Aside from its type location, B. rotunda has been collected near Mt. Wilhelm in Papua New Guinea. It is a tropical species; the holotype was collected from the Cape York Peninsula tropical savanna ecoregion, and it has been encountered in the Central Range montane rainforest of Papua New Guinea.
