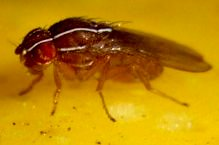

Scientific classification
- Kingdom: Animalia
- Phylum: Arthropoda
- Clade: Pancrustacea
- Class: Insecta
- Order: Diptera
- Family: Drosophilidae
- Genus: Zaprionus
- Species: Z. indianus

Binomial name
- Zaprionus indianus Gupta, 1970

= Zaprionus indianus =

Species of fly

Zaprionus indianus, the African fig fly, is a species of vinegar fly in the family Drosophilidae.

The species has become widely distributed in tropical regions of the world, as well as southern Europe and the U.S. Although the holotype was described from India, the species is considered to have originated from central Africa.
