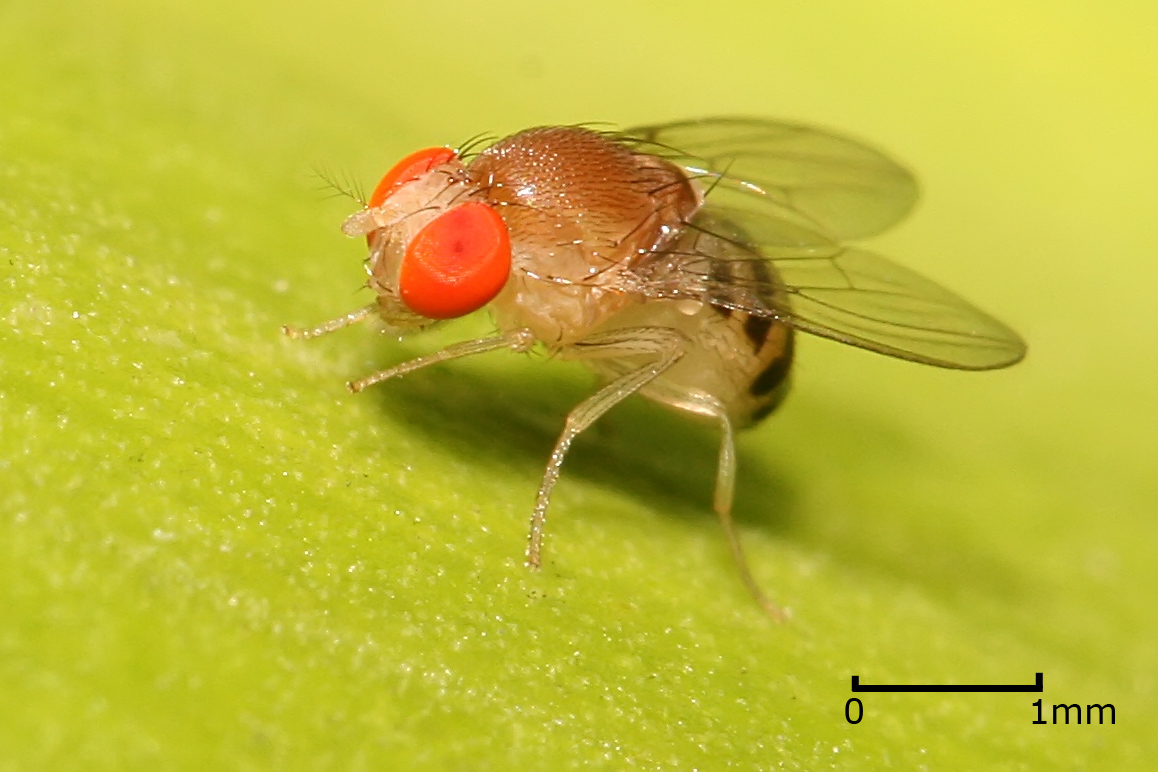
- Drosophila sp.

Scientific classification
- Domain: Eukaryota
- Kingdom: Animalia
- Phylum: Arthropoda
- Class: Insecta
- Order: Diptera
- Family: Drosophilidae
- Subfamily: Drosophilinae; Rondani, 1856

Tribes
- Drosophilini; Cladochaetini

= Drosophilinae =

Subfamily of flies

Mating behavior of a Chymomyza species (video, 2m 56s)

The Drosophilinae are the largest subfamily in the Drosophilidae. The other subfamily is the Steganinae.

== Phylogeny ==
Many molecular studies have addressed small parts of the phylogenetic tree. Most of these studies are limited to species of the genus Drosophila. The genus Drosophila is paraphyletic as several genera, such as Zaprionus, Scaptomyza and Lordiphosa, are positioned within the genus. Position of the bolded species in the phylogenetic tree is at least reasonably well supported by existing molecular evidence.

Tribe: Drosophilini

Subtribe: Colocasiomyina

Genus: Baeodrosophila
Genus: Colocasiomyia
Genus: Palmomyia
Genus: Palmophila

Subtribe: Drosophilina

Infratribe: Drosophiliti

Genus: Bialba
Genus: Calodrosophila
Genus: Celidosoma
Genus: Chymomyza
Genus: Dicladochaeta
Genus: Hypselothyrea
Genus: Jeannelopsis
Genus: Lissocephala
Genus: Marquesia
Genus: Microdrosophila
Genus: Mulgravea
Genus: Neotanygastrella
Genus: Paraliodrosophila
Genus: Poliocephala
Genus: Protochymomyza
Genus: Scaptodrosophila
Genus: Sphaerogastrella
Genus: Styloptera
Genus: Tambourella
Genus: Zaropunis
Genus: Drosophila including the following genera:

- Genus: Dettopsomyia
- Genus: Dichaetophora
- Genus: Hirtodrosophila
- Genus: Liodrosophila
- Genus: Lordiphosa
- Genus: Mycodrosophila
- Genus: Paramycodrosophila
- Genus: Phorticella
- Genus: Samoaia
- Genus: Scaptomyza
- Genus: Zaprionus
- Genus: Zygothrica

Infratribe: Laccodrosophiliti

Genus: Zapriothrica
Genus: Laccodrosophila

Tribe: Cladochaetini

Genus: Cladochaeta
Genus: Diathoneura

Tribe unknown:

Genus: Miomyia
Genus: Collessia
Genus: Balara

For species within the various genera, see Taxodros
