= Samoaia =

Scientific classification
- Domain: Eukaryota
- Kingdom: Animalia
- Phylum: Arthropoda
- Class: Insecta
- Order: Diptera
- Family: Drosophilidae
- Genus: Samoaia; Malloch, 1934

Genus of flies

Samoaia is a genus of flies belonging to the family Drosophilidae.

Species:

- Samoaia attenuata Wheeler & Kambysellis, 1966
- Samoaia comma Malloch, 1934
- Samoaia hirta Malloch, 1934
- Samoaia leonensis Wheeler & Kambysellis, 1966
- Samoaia mallochi Wheeler & Kambysellis, 1966
- Samoaia nuda Malloch, 1934
- Samoaia ocellaris Malloch, 1934
