= List of Leucophenga species =

This is a list of 246 species in Leucophenga, a genus of fruit flies in the family Drosophilidae.

== Leucophenga species ==
- Leucophenga abbreviata (Meijere, 1911)^{c g}
- Leucophenga aculeata ^{g}
- Leucophenga acuticauda ^{g}
- Leucophenga acutifoliacea ^{g}
- Leucophenga acutipennis Malloch, 1926^{c g}
- Leucophenga acutipollinosa Okada, 1987^{c g}
- Leucophenga africana Bachli, 1971^{c g}
- Leucophenga albiceps (Meijere, 1914)^{c g}
- Leucophenga albifascia Okada, 1966^{c g}
- Leucophenga albiterga ^{g}
- Leucophenga albofasciata (Macquart, 1851)^{c g}
- Leucophenga ambigua Kahl, 1917^{c g}
- Leucophenga angulata Singh, Dash & Fartyal, 2000^{c g}
- Leucophenga angusta Okada, 1956^{c g}
- Leucophenga angustifoliacea ^{g}
- Leucophenga apicifera (Adams, 1905)^{c g}
- Leucophenga apunctata Huang & Chen^{g}
- Leucophenga arcuata Huang & Chen^{g}
- Leucophenga argentata (Meijere, 1914)^{c g}
- Leucophenga argenteiventris Kahl, 1917^{c g}
- Leucophenga argenteofasciata Kahl, 1917^{c g}
- Leucophenga argentina (Meijere, 1924)^{c g}
- Leucophenga atra Bachli, 1971^{c g}
- Leucophenga atrinervis Okada, 1968^{c g}
- Leucophenga atriventris Lin & Wheeler, 1972^{c g}
- Leucophenga baculifoliacea ^{g}
- Leucophenga bakeri (Sturtevant, 1927)^{c g}
- Leucophenga basilaris (Adams, 1905)^{c g}
- Leucophenga bella Curran, 1928^{c g}
- Leucophenga bellula (Bergroth, 1894)^{c g}
- Leucophenga bezzii Sturtevant, 1927^{c g}
- Leucophenga bifasciata Duda, 1923^{c g}
- Leucophenga bifurcata ^{g}
- Leucophenga bimaculata (Loew, 1866)^{c g}
- Leucophenga bistriata Kahl, 1917^{c g}
- Leucophenga bivirgata Bachli, 1971^{c g}
- Leucophenga boninensis Wheeler & Takada, 1964^{c g}
- Leucophenga brazilensis Malloch, 1924^{c g}
- Leucophenga brevifoliacea Huang & Chen^{g}
- Leucophenga brunneipennis Kahl, 1917^{c g}
- Leucophenga burlai Bachli, 1971^{c g}
- Leucophenga buxtoni Duda, 1935^{c g}
- Leucophenga caliginosa Bachli, 1971^{c g}
- Leucophenga candida Bock, 1989^{c g}
- Leucophenga capillata Bachli, 1971^{c g}
- Leucophenga chaco Wheeler, 1968^{c g}
- Leucophenga champawatensis Fartyal & Singh, 2005^{c g}
- Leucophenga cincta (Meijere, 1911)^{c g}
- Leucophenga clubiata Singh, Dash, and Fartyal, 2000^{c g}
- Leucophenga concilia Okada, 1956^{c g}
- Leucophenga confluens Duda, 1923^{c g}
- Leucophenga cooperensis Bock, 1979^{c g}
- Leucophenga cornuta ^{g}
- Leucophenga costata Okada, 1966^{c g}
- Leucophenga cultella ^{g}
- Leucophenga cuneata Bachli, 1971^{c g}
- Leucophenga curvipila Duda, 1939^{c g}
- Leucophenga cuthbertsoni Malloch, 1929^{c g}
- Leucophenga cyanorosa Bock, 1979^{c g}
- Leucophenga cyclophylla ^{g}
- Leucophenga decaryi (Seguy, 1932)^{c g}
- Leucophenga denigrata Bachli, 1971^{c g}
- Leucophenga dentata Bachli, 1971^{c g}
- Leucophenga digmasoma Lin & Wheeler, 1972^{c g}
- Leucophenga dilatata Bachli, 1971^{c g}
- Leucophenga disjuncta Bachli, 1971^{c g}
- Leucophenga domanda Bock, 1984^{c g}
- Leucophenga dudai Bachli, 1971^{c g}
- Leucophenga edwardsi Bachli, 1971^{c g}
- Leucophenga elegans Duda, 1927^{c g}
- Leucophenga euryphylla Huang & Chen^{g}
- Leucophenga falcata Huang & Chen^{g}
- Leucophenga fenchihuensis Okada, 1987^{c g}
- Leucophenga fenestrata Duda, 1927^{c g}
- Leucophenga ferrari Bachli, Vilela & McEvey, 2005^{c g}
- Leucophenga flaviclypeata ^{g}
- Leucophenga flavicosta Duda, 1926^{c g}
- Leucophenga flaviseta (Adams, 1905)^{c g}
- Leucophenga flavohalterata Malloch, 1925^{c g}
- Leucophenga flavopuncta Malloch, 1925^{c g}
- Leucophenga formosa Okada, 1987^{c g}
- Leucophenga frontalis (Williston, 1896)^{c g}
- Leucophenga fuscinotata Huang & Chen^{g}
- Leucophenga fuscipedes ^{g}
- Leucophenga fuscipennis Duda, 1923^{c g}
- Leucophenga fuscithorax Huang & Chen^{g}
- Leucophenga fuscorbitata Bachli, 1971^{c g}
- Leucophenga gibbosa (Meijere, 1914)^{c g}
- Leucophenga glabella Huang & Chen^{g}
- Leucophenga goodi Kahl, 1917^{c g}
- Leucophenga gracilenta ^{g}
- Leucophenga grossipalpis (Lamb, 1914)^{c g}
- Leucophenga guro Burla, 1954^{c g}
- Leucophenga guttata Wheeler, 1952^{i c g}
- Leucophenga hasemani Kahl, 1917^{c g}
- Leucophenga helvetica Bachli, Vilela & Haring, 2002^{c g}
- Leucophenga hirsutina Huang & Chen^{g}
- Leucophenga hirticeps ^{g}
- Leucophenga hirudinis Huang & Chen^{g}
- Leucophenga horea Tsacas & Chassagnard, 1991^{c g}
- Leucophenga hungarica Papp, 2000^{c g}
- Leucophenga imminuta Bachli, 1971^{c g}
- Leucophenga incurvata Bachli, 1971^{c g}
- Leucophenga insulana (Schiner, 1868)^{c g}
- Leucophenga interrupta Duda, 1924^{c g}
- Leucophenga iriomotensis Chen & Aotsuka, 2003^{c g}
- Leucophenga isaka Bachli, Vilela & McEvey, 2005^{c g}
- Leucophenga ivontaka Bachli, Vilela & McEvey, 2005^{c g}
- Leucophenga jacobsoni Duda, 1926^{c g}
- Leucophenga janicae Bock, 1979^{c g}
- Leucophenga japonica Sidorenko, 1991^{c g}
- Leucophenga kilembensis Bachli, 1971^{c g}
- Leucophenga kurahashii Okada, 1987^{c g}
- Leucophenga lacteusa Takada & Wakahama, 1967^{c g}
- Leucophenga latevittata Duda, 1939^{c g}
- Leucophenga latifascia ^{g}
- Leucophenga latifrons Duda, 1923^{c g}
- Leucophenga latipenis ^{g}
- Leucophenga limbipennis (Meijere, 1908)^{c g}
- Leucophenga londti Bachli, Vilela & McEvey, 2005^{c g}
- Leucophenga lubrica Bock, 1979^{c g}
- Leucophenga lynettae Bock, 1984^{c g}
- Leucophenga maculata (Dufour, 1839)^{c g}
- Leucophenga maculosa (Coquillett, 1895)^{i c g b}
- Leucophenga magnicauda ^{g}
- Leucophenga magnipalpis Duda, 1923^{c g}
- Leucophenga magnornata Bachli, 1971^{c g}
- Leucophenga malgachensis Bachli, Vilela & McEvey, 2005^{c g}
- Leucophenga mananara Bachli, Vilela & McEvey, 2005^{c g}
- Leucophenga mansura (Adams, 1905)^{c g}
- Leucophenga meijerei Duda, 1924^{c g}
- Leucophenga melanogaster Tsacas & Chassagnard, 1991^{c g}
- Leucophenga meredithiana Okada, 1987^{c g}
- Leucophenga montana Wheeler, 1952^{i c g}
- Leucophenga muden Bachli, Vilela & McEvey, 2005^{c g}
- Leucophenga multipunctata Chen & Aotsuka, 2003^{c g}
- Leucophenga munroi Duda, 1939^{c g}
- Leucophenga mutabilis (Adams, 1905)^{c g}
- Leucophenga neoangusta Godbole & Vaidya, 1976^{c g}
- Leucophenga neointerrupta Fartyal & Toda, 2005^{g}
- Leucophenga neolacteusa Singh & Bhatt, 1988^{c g}
- Leucophenga neopalpalis Bachli, 1971^{c g}
- Leucophenga neovaria Wheeler, 1960^{i c g}
- Leucophenga neovittata Bachli, 1971^{c g}
- Leucophenga nigriceps Okada, 1966^{c g}
- Leucophenga nigrinervis Duda, 1924^{c g}
- Leucophenga nigripalpalis Tsacas & Chassagnard, 1991^{c g}
- Leucophenga nigripalpis Duda, 1923^{c g}
- Leucophenga nigrorbitata Bachli, 1971^{c g}
- Leucophenga nigroscutellata Duda, 1924^{c g}
- Leucophenga obscura Chen & Aotsuka, 2003^{c g}
- Leucophenga obscuripennis (Loew, 1866)^{c g}
- Leucophenga oedipus Seguy, 1938^{c g}
- Leucophenga okhalkandensis Singh, Dash & Fartyal, 2000^{c g}
- Leucophenga orientalis Lin & Wheeler, 1972^{c g}
- Leucophenga ornata Wheeler, 1959^{c g}
- Leucophenga ornativentris Kahl, 1917^{c g}
- Leucophenga pacifica Bock, 1986^{c g}
- Leucophenga palpalis (Adams, 1905)^{c g}
- Leucophenga paludicola Patterson and Mainland, 1944^{i c g}
- Leucophenga papuana Okada, 1987^{c g}
- Leucophenga paracapillata Bachli, 1971^{c g}
- Leucophenga paracuthbertsoni Bachli, 1971^{c g}
- Leucophenga paraflaviseta Bachli, 1971^{c g}
- Leucophenga patternella Bock, 1979^{c g}
- Leucophenga pectinata Okada, 1968^{c g}
- Leucophenga pentapunctata Panigrahy & Gupta, 1982^{c g}
- Leucophenga perargentata Bachli, 1971^{c g}
- Leucophenga pinguifoliacea ^{g}
- Leucophenga piscifoliacea Huang & Chen^{g}
- Leucophenga pleurovirgata Bachli, 1971^{c g}
- Leucophenga poeciliventris Malloch, 1923^{c g}
- Leucophenga ponapensis Wheeler & Takada, 1964^{c g}
- Leucophenga proxima (Adams, 1905)^{c g}
- Leucophenga pulcherrima Patterson and Mainland, 1944^{i c g}
- Leucophenga pulchra (Schiner, 1868)^{c g}
- Leucophenga quadrifurcata ^{g}
- Leucophenga quadripunctata (Meijere, 1908)^{c g}
- Leucophenga quinquemaculata Strobl, 1893^{c g}
- Leucophenga quinquemaculipennis Okada, 1956^{c g}
- Leucophenga ranohira Bachli, Vilela & McEvey, 2005^{c g}
- Leucophenga rectifoliacea Huang & Chen^{g}
- Leucophenga rectinervis Okada, 1966^{c g}
- Leucophenga regina Malloch, 1935^{c g}
- Leucophenga repletoides Bachli, 1971^{c g}
- Leucophenga retifoliacea ^{g}
- Leucophenga retihirta ^{g}
- Leucophenga rhombura ^{g}
- Leucophenga rimbickana Singh & Gupta, 1981^{c g}
- Leucophenga rudis (Walker, 1860)^{c g}
- Leucophenga rugatifolia ^{g}
- Leucophenga saigusai Okada, 1968^{c g}
- Leucophenga salatigae (Meijere, 1914)^{c g}
- Leucophenga samoaensis Harrison, 1954^{c g}
- Leucophenga scaevolaevora (Seguy, 1951)^{c g}
- Leucophenga schnuseana Duda, 1927^{c g}
- Leucophenga sculpta Chen & Toda, 1994^{c g}
- Leucophenga scutellata Malloch, 1923^{c g}
- Leucophenga securis ^{g}
- Leucophenga sema Burla, 1954^{c g}
- Leucophenga semicapillata Bachli, 1971^{c g}
- Leucophenga sericea (Lamb, 1914)^{c g}
- Leucophenga serrata Bachli, 1971^{c g}
- Leucophenga serrateifoliacea Huang & Chen^{g}
- Leucophenga setipalpis Duda, 1923^{c g}
- Leucophenga shillongensis Dwivedi & Gupta, 1979^{c g}
- Leucophenga sierraleonica Bachli, 1971^{c g}
- Leucophenga sinupenis ^{g}
- Leucophenga sordida Duda, 1923^{c g}
- Leucophenga sorii Kang, Lee & Bahng, 1965^{c g}
- Leucophenga spilossoma Lin & Wheeler, 1972^{c g}
- Leucophenga spinifera Okada, 1987^{c g}
- Leucophenga stackelbergi Duda, 1934^{c g}
- Leucophenga stenomaculipennis Okada, 1968^{c g}
- Leucophenga stigma Bock, 1979^{c g}
- Leucophenga striata Bachli, 1971^{c g}
- Leucophenga striatipennis Okada, 1989^{c g}
- Leucophenga stuckenbergi Bachli, Vilela & McEvey, 2005^{c g}
- Leucophenga subacutipennis Duda, 1924^{c g}
- Leucophenga subpollinosa (Meijere, 1914)^{c g}
- Leucophenga subulata Huang & Chen^{g}
- Leucophenga subvirgata Bachli, 1971^{c g}
- Leucophenga subvittata Duda, 1939^{c g}
- Leucophenga sujuanae ^{g}
- Leucophenga taiwanensis Lin & Wheeler, 1972^{c g}
- Leucophenga tenebrosa Bachli, 1971^{c g}
- Leucophenga tenuipalpis Takada & Momma, 1975^{c g}
- Leucophenga todai Sidorenko, 1991^{c g}
- Leucophenga tripunctipennis Malloch, 1926^{c g}
- Leucophenga trisphenata Wheeler, 1952^{i c g}
- Leucophenga trispina Upadhyay & Singh, 2007^{c g}
- Leucophenga tritaeniata Duda, 1923^{c g}
- Leucophenga trivittata Okada, 1991^{c g}
- Leucophenga umbratula Duda, 1924^{c g}
- Leucophenga umbrosa Bachli, 1971^{c g}
- Leucophenga uncinata Huang & Chen^{g}
- Leucophenga undulata (Hendel, 1913)^{c g}
- Leucophenga unifasciventris Malloch, 1926^{c g}
- Leucophenga varia (Walker, 1849)^{i c g b}
- Leucophenga varinervis Duda, 1923^{c g}
- Leucophenga villosa ^{g}
- Leucophenga violae Bock, 1979^{c g}
- Leucophenga wauensis Okada, 1989^{c g}
- Leucophenga xanthobasis Curran, 1936^{c g}
- Leucophenga zebra Bock, 1979^{c g}
- Leucophenga zhenfangae ^{g}

Data sources: i = ITIS, c = Catalogue of Life, g = GBIF, b = Bugguide.net
