= List of Stegana species =

This is a list of species in Stegana, a genus of vinegar flies in the family Drosophilidae.

== Stegana species ==
- Stegana acantha ^{g}
- Stegana acutangula (Hendel, 1913)^{c g}
- Stegana adentata Toda & Peng, 1992^{c g}
- Stegana affinis Malloch, 1924^{c g}
- Stegana africana Malloch, 1934^{c g}
- Stegana alianya Zhang & Chen, 2021
- Stegana ancistrophylla ^{g}
- Stegana angulata Chen & Chen^{g}
- Stegana annulata Haliday, 1833^{c g}
- Stegana annulosa (Duda, 1929)^{c g}
- Stegana antica Curran, 1934^{c g}
- Stegana antigua Wheeler, 1960^{i c g}
- Stegana antila Sidorenko & Okada, 1991^{g}
- Stegana antlia Okada, 1991^{c g}
- Stegana aotsukai Chen & Wang, 2004^{c g}
- Stegana apicopubescens ^{g}
- Stegana apicosetosa ^{g}
- Stegana arcygramma Chen & Chen, 2008^{c g}
- Stegana atrifrons Malloch, 1924^{c g}
- Stegana atrimana Malloch, 1924^{c g}
- Stegana bacilla Chen & Aotsuka, 2004^{c g}
- Stegana baechlii Lastovka & Maca, 1982^{c g}
- Stegana barretti Johnson, 1921^{i}
- Stegana belokobylskiji Sidorenko, 1997^{c g}
- Stegana bicoloripes Tsacas, 1990^{c g}
- Stegana biprotrusa Chen & Aotsuka, 2004^{c g}
- Stegana brasiliensis (Duda, 1927)^{c}
- Stegana brevibarba Cao & Chen, 2008^{c g}
- Stegana brunnea Malloch, 1924^{c g}
- Stegana burmensis Sidorenko, 1997^{c g}
- Stegana capillaria Cao & Chen, 2008^{c g}
- Stegana castanea Okada, 1988^{c g}
- Stegana cheni Sidorenko, 1997^{c g}
- Stegana chitouensis Sidorenko, 1998^{c g}
- Stegana claudana Bock, 1982^{c g}
- Stegana coleoptrata (Scopoli, 1763)^{i c g}
- Stegana conformis Malloch, 1924^{c g}
- Stegana consimilis Papp & Maca, 2000^{c g}
- Stegana convergens (Meijere, 1911)^{c g}
- Stegana crescentica Gupta & Panigrahy, 1987^{c g}
- Stegana cristimana Malloch, 1924^{c g}
- Stegana ctenaria Nishiharu, 1979^{c g}
- Stegana curvinervis (Hendel, 1914)^{c g}
- Stegana danbaensis ^{g}
- Stegana dendrobium Chen & Aotsuka, 2004^{c g}
- Stegana dentifera Lastovka and Maca, 1982^{i c g}
- Stegana dianensis ^{g}
- Stegana diodonta Zhang & Chen, 2021
- Stegana dorsolineata Duda, 1925^{c g}
- Stegana earli Bock, 1982^{c g}
- Stegana emeiensis Sidorenko, 1997^{c g}
- Stegana enigma Sidorenko, 1998^{c g}
- Stegana flavifrons Malloch, 1924^{c g}
- Stegana flavimana Malloch, 1924^{c g}
- Stegana fumipennis (Enderlein, 1922)^{c g}
- Stegana furta (Linnaeus, 1767)^{c g}
- Stegana fuscibasis Malloch, 1924^{c g}
- Stegana glabra ^{g}
- Stegana hirtipenis Xu, Gao & Chen, 2007^{c g}
- Stegana horae Williston, 1896^{c g}
- Stegana hypoleuca Meigen, 1830^{c g}
- Stegana ikedai Okada & Sidorenko, 1992^{c g}
- Stegana intermedia (Duda, 1927)^{c g}
- Stegana interrupta Malloch, 1924^{c g}
- Stegana izu Sidorenko, 1997^{c g}
- Stegana kanmiyai Okada & Sidorenko, 1992^{c g}
- Stegana lamondi Bock, 1982^{c g}
- Stegana langufoliacea ^{g}
- Stegana lateralis Wulp, 1897^{c g}
- Stegana latipenis Xu, Gao & Chen, 2007^{c g}
- Stegana leucomelana (Walker, 1859)^{c g}
- Stegana longibarba Cao & Chen, 2008^{c g}
- Stegana longifibula Takada, 1968^{c g}
- Stegana magnifica Hendel, 1913^{c g}
- Stegana maichouensis Sidorenko, 1998^{c g}
- Stegana masanoritodai Okada & Sidorenko, 1992^{c g}
- Stegana mediospinosa ^{g}
- Stegana mehadiae Duda, 1924^{c g}
- Stegana meichiensis Chen & Toda, 1994^{c g}
- Stegana melanostigma Chen & Chen, 2008^{c g}
- Stegana melanostoma Chen & Chen, 2008^{c g}
- Stegana minor Duda, 1927^{c g}
- Stegana monochrous Tsacas, 1990^{c g}
- Stegana monodonata Chen & Chen, 2008^{c g}
- Stegana montana ^{g}
- Stegana moritha Sidorenko, 1997^{c g}
- Stegana multiclavata Cao & Chen, 2008^{c g}
- Stegana nainitalensis Singh & Fartyal, 2002^{c g}
- Stegana nartshukae Sidorenko, 1997^{c g}
- Stegana nigrifrons Meijere, 1911^{c g}
- Stegana nigrimana Malloch, 1924^{c g}
- Stegana nigripennis (Hendel, 1914)^{c g}
- Stegana nigrita Malloch, 1924^{c g}
- Stegana nigrithorax Strobl, 1898^{c g}
- Stegana nigrolimbata Duda, 1924^{c g}
- Stegana nigromarginata Duda, 1925^{c g}
- Stegana norma Curran, 1934^{c g}
- Stegana oligochaeta ^{g}
- Stegana ornatipes Wheeler & Takada, 1964^{c g}
- Stegana otocondyloda ^{g}
- Stegana pallipes Wiedemann, 1830^{c g}
- Stegana papuana Okada & Sidorenko, 1992^{c g}
- Stegana parvispina ^{g}
- Stegana penihexata Gupta & Panigrahy, 1987^{c g}
- Stegana pianmaensis ^{g}
- Stegana pililobosa Chen & Chen, 2008^{c g}
- Stegana planifacies Malloch, 1924^{c g}
- Stegana platypezina (Duda, 1927)^{c g}
- Stegana plesia Tsacas & Chassagnard, 1996^{c g}
- Stegana prigenti Chen & Wang, 2004^{c g}
- Stegana protuberans ^{g}
- Stegana proximata (Seguy, 1938)^{c g}
- Stegana psilolobosa Chen & Chen, 2008^{c g}
- Stegana pyinoolwinensis Sidorenko, 1997^{c g}
- Stegana scarabeo Bock, 1982^{c g}
- Stegana schildi Malloch, 1924^{c g}
- Stegana scutellata Meijere, 1911^{c g}
- Stegana setifrons Sidorenko, 1997^{c g}
- Stegana shirozui Okada, 1971^{c g}
- Stegana sibirica (Duda, 1934)^{c g}
- Stegana sidorenkoi Hu & Toda, 1994^{c g}
- Stegana similis Lastovka & Maca, 1982^{c g}
- Stegana singularis Sidorenko, 1990^{c g}
- Stegana sinica Sidorenko, 1991^{c g}
- Stegana spyrotsakasi Tsacas, 1997^{c g}
- Stegana stuckenbergi Tsacas, 1990^{c g}
- Stegana subconvergens Okada, 1988^{c g}
- Stegana subexcavata Vaidya & Godbole, 1976^{c g}
- Stegana taba Okada, 1971^{c g}
- Stegana taiwana Okada, 1991^{c g}
- Stegana tarsalis Williston, 1896^{c g}
- Stegana tempifera Malloch, 1924^{c g}
- Stegana tenebrosa (Walker, 1865)^{c g}
- Stegana tentaculifera ^{g}
- Stegana toyaensis Okada & Sidorenko, 1992^{c g}
- Stegana triseta (Duda, 1925)^{c g}
- Stegana trisetosa Chen & Wang, 2004^{c g}
- Stegana undulata Meijere, 1911^{c g}
- Stegana unidentata Takada, 1968^{c g}
- Stegana uniformis Malloch, 1924^{c g}
- Stegana varicolor (Duda, 1925)^{c g}
- Stegana varipes Tsacas, 1990^{c g}
- Stegana vietnamensis Sidorenko, 1997^{c g}
- Stegana vittata (Coquillett, 1901)^{i c g b}
- Stegana watabei Sidorenko, 1998^{c g}
- Stegana wheeleri Lastovka and Maca, 1982^{i c g}
- Stegana xiaoleiae Cao & Chen, 2008^{c g}
- Stegana xishuangbanna ^{g}
- Stegana xuei Hu & Toda, 1994^{c g}
- Stegana yapingi Chen & Wang, 2004^{c g}
- Stegana zebromyia Zhang & Chen, 2021'
- Stegana zhangi Sidorenko, 1997^{c g}
- Stegana zopheria Zhang & Chen, 2021

Data sources: i = ITIS, c = Catalogue of Life, g = GBIF, b = Bugguide.net
