= List of Cladochaeta species =

This is a list of 123 species in the genus Cladochaeta, spittlebug flies.

== Cladochaeta species ==
- Cladochaeta abarista Grimaldi & Nguyen, 1999^{c g}
- Cladochaeta abbrevifusca Grimaldi & Nguyen, 1999^{c g}
- Cladochaeta abeja Grimaldi & Nguyen, 1999^{c g}
- Cladochaeta abrupta Grimaldi & Nguyen, 1999^{c g}
- Cladochaeta adumbrata (Duda, 1925)^{c g}
- Cladochaeta adusta Grimaldi & Nguyen, 1999^{c g}
- Cladochaeta akantha Grimaldi & Nguyen, 1999^{c g}
- Cladochaeta albifrons Grimaldi & Nguyen, 1999^{c g}
- Cladochaeta ambidextra Grimaldi & Nguyen, 1999^{c g}
- Cladochaeta amblyharpa Grimaldi & Nguyen, 1999^{c g}
- Cladochaeta antalba Grimaldi & Nguyen, 1999^{c g}
- Cladochaeta aquila Grimaldi & Nguyen, 1999^{c g}
- Cladochaeta armata (Frota-Pessoa, 1947)^{c g}
- Cladochaeta armatopsis Pirani & Amorim, 2016^{g}
- Cladochaeta arthrostyla Grimaldi & Nguyen, 1999^{c g}
- Cladochaeta austrinversa Grimaldi & Nguyen, 1999^{c g}
- Cladochaeta bilinea Grimaldi & Nguyen, 1999^{c g}
- Cladochaeta bispina Grimaldi & Nguyen, 1999^{c g}
- Cladochaeta bomplandi (Malloch, 1934)^{c g}
- Cladochaeta brunnea Grimaldi & Nguyen, 1999^{c g}
- Cladochaeta bupeo Grimaldi & Nguyen, 1999^{c g}
- Cladochaeta calvovis Grimaldi & Nguyen, 1999^{c g}
- Cladochaeta carinata Grimaldi & Nguyen, 1999^{c g}
- Cladochaeta centetor Grimaldi & Nguyen, 1999^{c g}
- Cladochaeta chaeta Grimaldi & Nguyen, 1999^{c g}
- Cladochaeta chelifera Grimaldi & Nguyen, 1999^{c g}
- Cladochaeta crassa Grimaldi & Nguyen, 1999^{c g}
- Cladochaeta dejecta Grimaldi & Nguyen, 1999^{c g}
- Cladochaeta devriesi Grimaldi & Nguyen, 1999^{c g}
- Cladochaeta dikra Grimaldi & Nguyen, 1999^{c g}
- Cladochaeta diminuta Grimaldi & Nguyen, 1999^{c g}
- Cladochaeta dolichofrons Grimaldi & Nguyen, 1999^{c g}
- Cladochaeta dominicana Grimaldi & Nguyen, 1999^{c g}
- Cladochaeta dominitica Grimaldi & Nguyen, 1999^{c g}
- Cladochaeta dracula Grimaldi & Nguyen, 1999^{c g}
- Cladochaeta ectopia Grimaldi & Nguyen, 1999^{c g}
- Cladochaeta erecta Grimaldi & Nguyen, 1999^{c g}
- Cladochaeta fasciata Grimaldi & Nguyen, 1999^{c g}
- Cladochaeta floridana (Malloch, 1924)^{i c g}
- Cladochaeta florinversa Grimaldi & Nguyen, 1999^{c g}
- Cladochaeta fuscora Grimaldi & Nguyen, 1999^{c g}
- Cladochaeta genuinus Grimaldi & Nguyen, 1999^{c g}
- Cladochaeta glans Grimaldi & Nguyen, 1999^{c g}
- Cladochaeta glapica Grimaldi & Nguyen, 1999^{c g}
- Cladochaeta hadrunca Grimaldi & Nguyen, 1999^{c g}
- Cladochaeta hamula Grimaldi & Nguyen, 1999^{c g}
- Cladochaeta heedi Grimaldi & Nguyen, 1999^{c g}
- Cladochaeta hermani Grimaldi & Nguyen, 1999^{c g}
- Cladochaeta hodita Grimaldi & Nguyen, 1999^{c g}
- Cladochaeta howdeni Grimaldi & Nguyen, 1999^{c g}
- Cladochaeta incessa Grimaldi & Nguyen, 1999^{c g}
- Cladochaeta infumata (Duda, 1925)^{c g}
- Cladochaeta inornata Grimaldi & Nguyen, 1999^{c g}
- Cladochaeta inversa (Walker, 1861)^{i c g b}
- Cladochaeta jamaicensis Grimaldi & Nguyen, 1999^{c g}
- Cladochaeta janzeni Grimaldi & Nguyen, 1999^{c g}
- Cladochaeta johnsonae Nguyen, 2001^{c g}
- Cladochaeta labidia Grimaldi & Nguyen, 1999^{c g}
- Cladochaeta laevacerca Grimaldi & Nguyen, 1999^{c g}
- Cladochaeta longistyla Grimaldi & Nguyen, 1999^{c g}
- Cladochaeta masneri Grimaldi & Nguyen, 1999^{c g}
- Cladochaeta mathisi Grimaldi & Nguyen, 1999^{c g}
- Cladochaeta mexinversa Grimaldi & Nguyen, 1999^{c g}
- Cladochaeta minuta (Duda, 1925)^{c}
- Cladochaeta mystaca Grimaldi & Nguyen, 1999^{c g}
- Cladochaeta neblina Grimaldi & Nguyen, 1999^{c g}
- Cladochaeta nebulosa Coquillett, 1900^{i c g}
- Cladochaeta neoinversa Grimaldi & Nguyen, 1999^{c g}
- Cladochaeta neosimplex Grimaldi & Nguyen, 1999^{c g}
- Cladochaeta nigranus Grimaldi & Nguyen, 1999^{c g}
- Cladochaeta obscura Grimaldi & Nguyen, 1999^{c g}
- Cladochaeta obunca Grimaldi & Nguyen, 1999^{c g}
- Cladochaeta onyx Grimaldi & Nguyen, 1999^{c g}
- Cladochaeta ostia Grimaldi & Nguyen, 1999^{c g}
- Cladochaeta paradoxa (Lamb, 1918)^{c g}
- Cladochaeta paravolsella Grimaldi & Nguyen, 1999^{c g}
- Cladochaeta paulhansoni Grimaldi & Nguyen, 1999^{c g}
- Cladochaeta pequenita Grimaldi & Nguyen, 1999^{c g}
- Cladochaeta pleurvitta Grimaldi & Nguyen, 1999^{c g}
- Cladochaeta polia Grimaldi & Nguyen, 1999^{c g}
- Cladochaeta propenicula Grimaldi & Nguyen, 1999^{c g}
- Cladochaeta pruinopleura Grimaldi & Nguyen, 1999^{c g}
- Cladochaeta pseudikra Grimaldi & Nguyen, 1999^{c g}
- Cladochaeta pseudunca Grimaldi & Nguyen, 1999^{c g}
- Cladochaeta psychotria Grimaldi & Nguyen, 1999^{c g}
- Cladochaeta ptyelophila Tsacas, 1993^{c g}
- Cladochaeta ranhyae Grimaldi & Nguyen, 1999^{c g}
- Cladochaeta reversa Grimaldi & Nguyen, 1999^{c g}
- Cladochaeta robusta Grimaldi & Nguyen, 1999^{c g}
- Cladochaeta santana Grimaldi & Nguyen, 1999^{c g}
- Cladochaeta sclerstyla Grimaldi & Nguyen, 1999^{c g}
- Cladochaeta sepia Grimaldi & Nguyen, 1999^{c g}
- Cladochaeta similex Grimaldi & Nguyen, 1999^{c g}
- Cladochaeta simplex Grimaldi & Nguyen, 1999^{c g}
- Cladochaeta sororia (Williston, 1896)^{c g}
- Cladochaeta spectabilis Grimaldi & Nguyen, 1999^{c g}
- Cladochaeta spinacosta Grimaldi & Nguyen, 1999^{c g}
- Cladochaeta spinula Grimaldi & Nguyen, 1999^{c g}
- Cladochaeta spira Grimaldi & Nguyen, 1999^{c g}
- Cladochaeta starki Grimaldi & Nguyen, 1999^{c g}
- Cladochaeta sternospina Grimaldi & Nguyen, 1999^{c g}
- Cladochaeta sturtevanti Wheeler & Takada, 1971^{i c g b}
- Cladochaeta telescopica Grimaldi & Nguyen, 1999^{c g}
- Cladochaeta tepui Grimaldi & Nguyen, 1999^{c g}
- Cladochaeta tica Grimaldi & Nguyen, 1999^{c g}
- Cladochaeta trauma Grimaldi & Nguyen, 1999^{c g}
- Cladochaeta travassosi (Frota-Pessoa, 1947)^{c g}
- Cladochaeta tricerabops Grimaldi & Nguyen, 1999^{c g}
- Cladochaeta tripunctata Grimaldi & Nguyen, 1999^{c g}
- Cladochaeta tubula Grimaldi & Nguyen, 1999^{c g}
- Cladochaeta unca Grimaldi & Nguyen, 1999^{c g}
- Cladochaeta vapida Grimaldi & Nguyen, 1999^{c g}
- Cladochaeta venebula Grimaldi & Nguyen, 1999^{c g}
- Cladochaeta verdifrons Grimaldi & Nguyen, 1999^{c g}
- Cladochaeta vermes Grimaldi & Nguyen, 1999^{c g}
- Cladochaeta vittata Grimaldi & Nguyen, 1999^{c g}
- Cladochaeta vivipara Grimaldi & Nguyen, 1999^{c g}
- Cladochaeta volsella Grimaldi & Nguyen, 1999^{c g}
- Cladochaeta vomica Grimaldi & Nguyen, 1999^{c g}
- Cladochaeta wilhansoni Grimaldi & Nguyen, 1999^{c g}
- Cladochaeta wirthi Grimaldi & Nguyen, 1999^{c g}
- Cladochaeta yanomama Grimaldi & Nguyen, 1999^{c g}
- Cladochaeta zurquia Grimaldi & Nguyen, 1999^{c g}

Data sources: i = ITIS, c = Catalogue of Life, g = GBIF, b = Bugguide.net
