= Cladochaeta =

Cladochaeta may refer to:

- Cladochaeta (plant), a genus of the family Asteraceae
- Cladochaeta (fly), a genus of the family Drosophilidae
