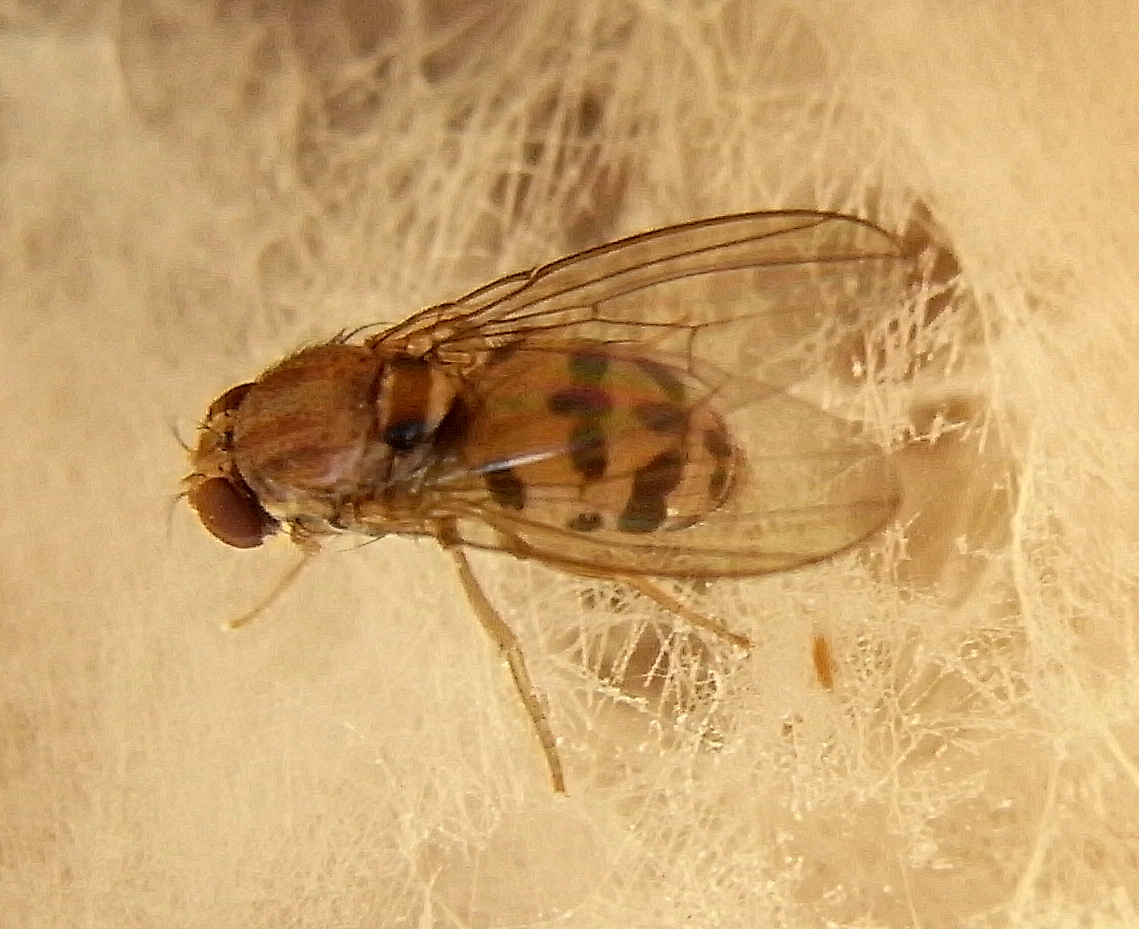
- Leucophenga maculata

Scientific classification
- Kingdom: Animalia
- Phylum: Arthropoda
- Class: Insecta
- Order: Diptera
- Family: Drosophilidae
- Subfamily: Steganinae; Hendel, 1917

Tribes
- Steganini; Gitonini

= Steganinae =

Subfamily of flies

The Steganinae Hendel, 1917, is the smaller of two subfamilies in the fruit fly family Drosophilidae. The other subfamily is the Drosophilinae.

== Diagnosis ==
The subfamily is monophyletic (Grimaldi 1990; Sidorenko 2002), but can not be characterised by a single morphological character that distinguishes this subfamily from the Drosophilinae. See for a discussion on this subfamily "Drosophila: A Laboratory Handbook" by M. Ashburner, S. Hawley, K. Golic (not reproduced here due to copyrights).

- D. A. Grimaldi 1990. A phylogenetic, revised classification of genera in the Drosophilidae (Diptera). Bulletin of the American Museum of Natural History 197: 1–128.
- V. S. Sidorenko 2002. Phylogeny of the tribe Steganini Hendel and some related taxa (Diptera, Drosophilidae). Far Eastern Entomologist 111: 1-20.

== Phylogeny ==
The phylogenetic relationships within the subfamily have not yet been confirmed by molecular studies, and are partially based on traditional cladistic methods using primarily morphological characteristics and partly based on expert opinions. The classification below might be not approved by all scholars in the field, but gives a reasonable overview of our current knowledge:

Tribe: Steganini

Subtribe: Steganina

Genus: Eostegana
Genus: Stegana

Subtribe: Leucophengina

Genus: Allopygaea
Genus: Cacoxenus
Genus: Leucophenga

Tribe: Gitonini

Subtribe: Gitonina

Genus: Amiota
Genus: Apenthecia
Genus: Apsiphortica
Genus: Cacoxenus
Genus: Crincosia
Genus: Erima
Genus: Gitona
Genus: Paraleucophenga
Genus: Paraphortica
Genus: Phortica

Subtribe: Acletoxenina

Genus: Acletoxenus
Genus: Hyalistata
Genus: Mayagueza
Genus: Pseudiastata
Genus: Rhinoleucophenga
Genus: Trachyleucophenga

Subtribe unknown

Genus: Electrophortica
Genus: Pararhinoleucophenga
Genus: Parastegana
Genus: Pseudostegana

Tribe unknown

Genus: Soederbomia
Genus: Pyrgometopa

For species within the various genera, see fix Taxodros

Leucophenga maculata (Steganinae) ovipositing on fungus.
