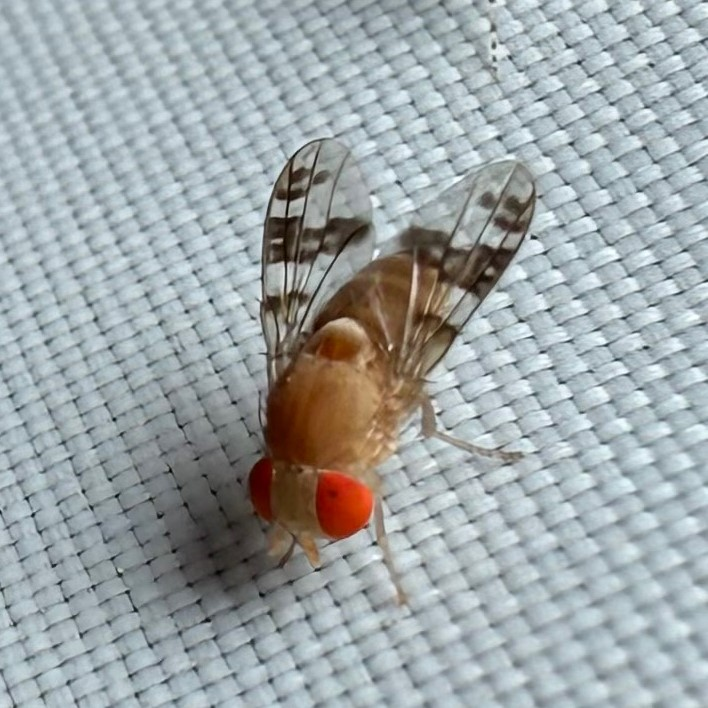

Scientific classification
- Kingdom: Animalia
- Phylum: Arthropoda
- Clade: Pancrustacea
- Class: Insecta
- Order: Diptera
- Family: Drosophilidae
- Genus: Pseudiastata
- Species: P. nebulosa

Binomial name
- Pseudiastata nebulosa Coquillett, 1908

= Pseudiastata nebulosa =

Species of fly

Pseudiastata nebulosa is a species of fruit fly in the family Drosophilidae.
