= Rhinoleucophenga obesa =

Scientific classification
- Domain: Eukaryota
- Kingdom: Animalia
- Phylum: Arthropoda
- Class: Insecta
- Order: Diptera
- Family: Drosophilidae
- Genus: Rhinoleucophenga
- Species: R. obesa

Binomial name
- Rhinoleucophenga obesa (Loew, 1872)

Synonyms
- Drosophila obesa Loew, 1872; Phortica hirtifrons Johnson, 1913

Species of fly

Rhinoleucophenga obesa is a species of fruit fly in the family Drosophilidae.
