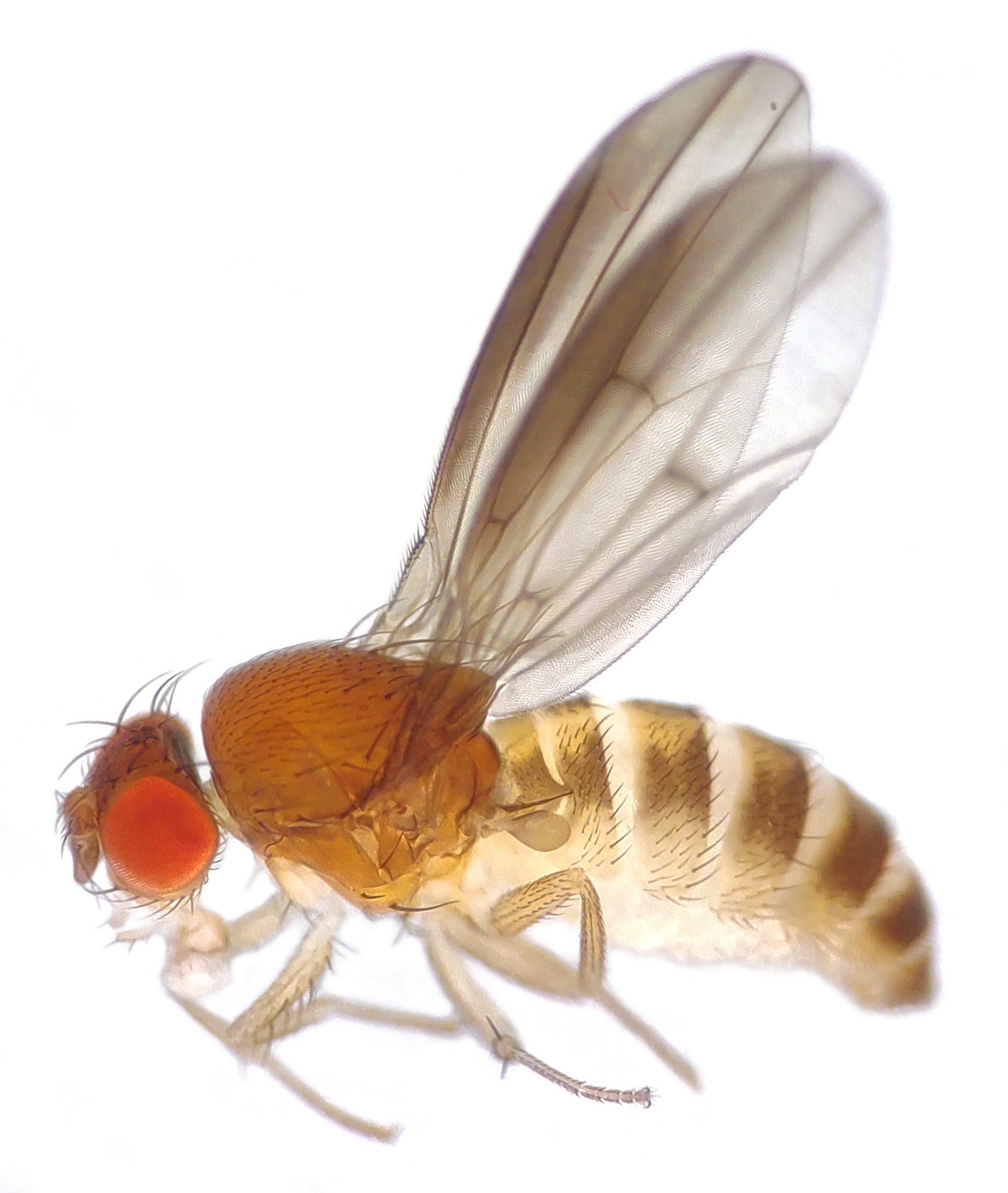

Scientific classification
- Kingdom: Animalia
- Phylum: Arthropoda
- Clade: Pancrustacea
- Class: Insecta
- Order: Diptera
- Family: Drosophilidae
- Subfamily: Drosophilinae
- Genus: Cladochaeta; Coquillett, 1900

Diversity
- 136 species

= Cladochaeta (fly) =

Genus of flies

Cladochaeta is a genus of fly in the family Drosophilidae. They are commonly called spittlebug flies because as larvae, they are inquilines of the foam shelters produced by spittlebug nymphs. The genus comprises 136 species distributed across North and South America, with most diversity found in the Neotropics. However, it is estimated that number may reach 500–800 when accounting for undescribed species.

== Taxonomy ==
=== History ===
The genus Cladochaeta was established by Coquillett in 1900 for the species Cladochaeta nebulosa. Two decades later, Malloch erected the genus Clastopteromyia for the species Drosophila inversa—with Clastoptera being the host genus and "myia" meaning "fly." For the next several decades, there was considerable uncertainty regarding the definitions of Cladochaeta, Clastopteromyia, and a third genus, Diathoneura. Clastopteromyia was synonymized with Cladochaeta in 1971; Cladochaeta and Diathoneura were only more clearly defined in a series of papers in the 1990s, culminating in a monographic revision by Grimaldi and Nguyen, 1999, which described 105 new species for the former genus. However, they did not examine much of the Brazilian fauna, which are continuing to be described.

=== Relationships ===
Cladochaeta forms the tribe Cladochaetini with the closely related genus Diathoneura within the subfamily Drosophilinae. The tribe is characterized by a number of traits, including the loss of anal veins and certain features of the male genitalia.

== Description ==
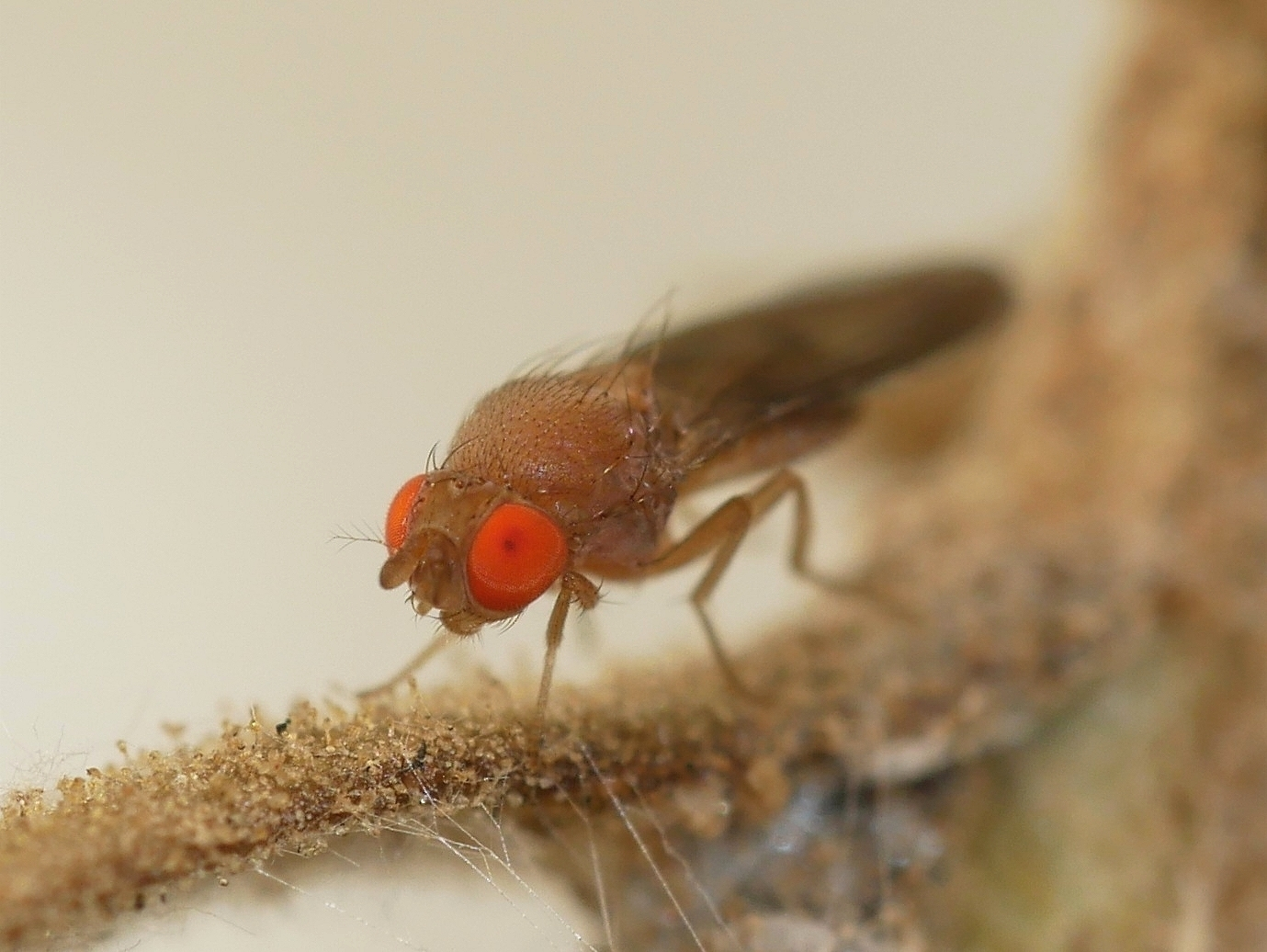
Adult Cladochaeta sturtevanti

Adult Cladochaeta are small, indistinct fruit flies, generally yellowish to brownish in color and not exceeding 3 mm in length. They are distinguished from other drosophilids by a combination of genitalia and features of the head and wings. The face lacks or only has a slight median carina. The wings are mostly clear, sometimes with dark coloring on the crossveins or along the anterior half, and the anal veins are reduced. The cerci of the male terminalia generally extend ventrally and the surstylus is club-shaped. The female terminalia are considerably reduced, with both the oviscapt and the spermathecae poorly developed.

There is a lack of external morphological features differentiating the species of Cladochaeta, which are most reliably—and often only—identified by the male terminalia, which are complex and diverse in form. Eleven species groups have been defined based on those structures and features of the head and wing, named for the earliest described species of each (except dikra): armata, bomplandi, dikra, diminuta, inversa, nebulosa, ostia, simplex, sororia, tripunctata, and unca.

== Distribution ==
Cladochaeta is an exclusively New World lineage, and is the largest group of fruit flies that is restricted to the Western Hemisphere. Most of the described species are found in Central America, with only seven present in the US and Canada: C. inversa, C. dracula, C. floridana, C. florinversa, C. heedi, C. sturtevanti, and C. wilhansoni.

== Natural history ==
=== Viviparity ===
Females of several species have been found with young larvae in their abdomens, suggesting the ability for viviparity in Cladochaeta. The ability to birth live young (either facultatively or obligate) is found across a number of unrelated drosophilid taxa, including Diathoneura cruciata in the sister genus to Cladochaeta. Other drosophilid genera in which viviparity has been observed include Amiota, Colocasiomyia, Drosophila, Scaptodrosophila, and Scaptomyza.

=== Larval biology ===
==== Association with spittlebugs ====
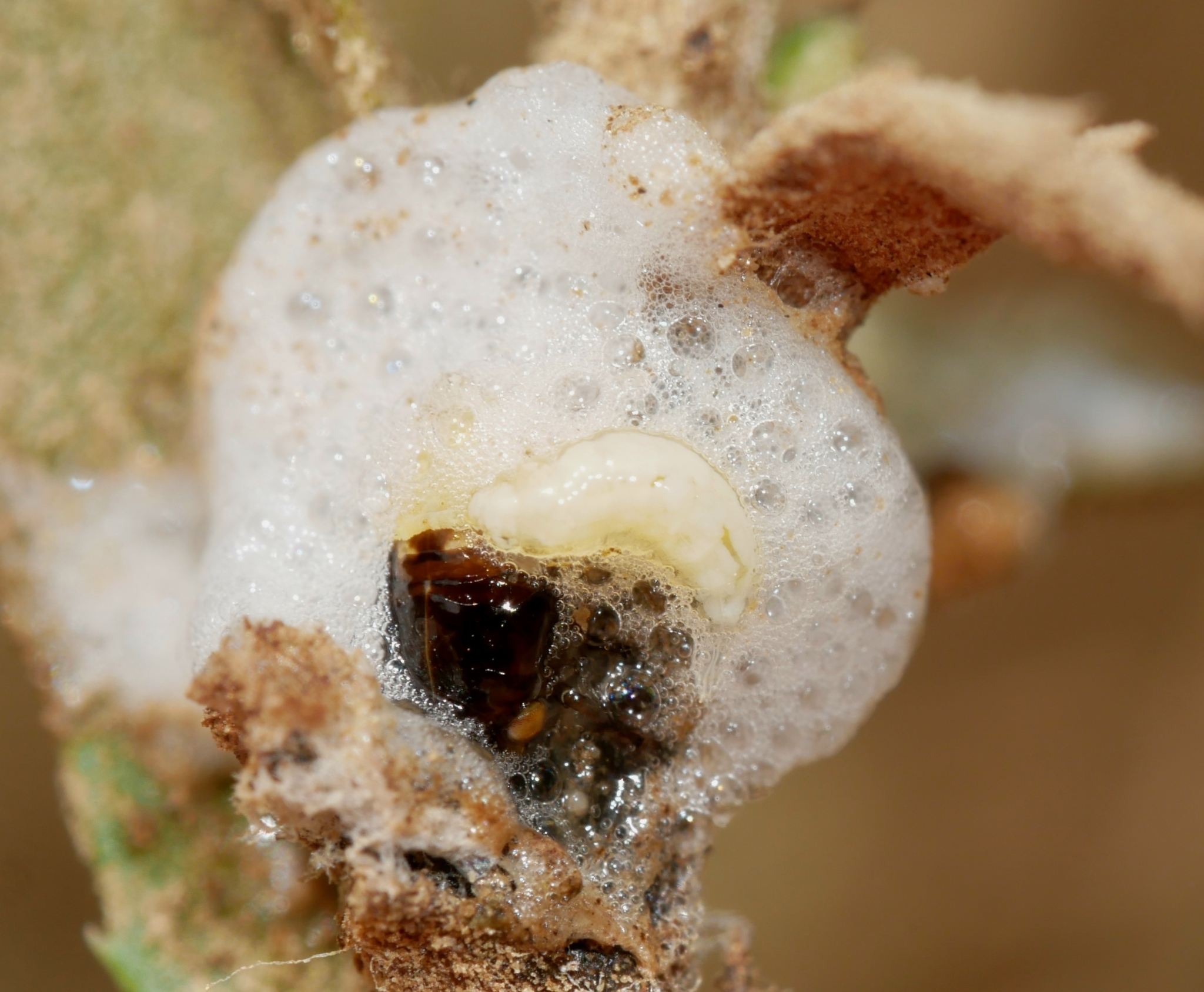
Larva of Cladochaeta sturtevanti on a Clastoptera sp. nymph inside spittle mass

The larvae of most Cladochaeta reside in masses of spittle produced by the young of Clastopteridae and Aphrophoridae, attached to the host by mandibular hooks. It is not conclusive whether or not their association is harmful to the spittlebug host. Although the association was first reported at the beginning of the 20th century, William Baerg was the first to examine the symbiosis in greater detail in 1920. He found the vast majority of the spittlebugs found with larvae were unharmed and concluded the flies were feeding on the spittle produced, and only phoretic on the bug. This was the conclusion largely reached also by Bennett (1965) and Ashburner (1981). Bennett found no injury on the integument of spittlebug nymphs found with larvae, and two of the ten fly eggs he raised solely on spittle pupated. However, none of the pupae eclosed, and pupation may often occur in response to starvation in Drosophila. Thompson and Mohd-Saleh investigated the organisms experimentally in 1995 and found no effect of Cladochaeta larvae on both nymphal or size of the adult spittlebug. They also noted that the flies were often unattached to the spittlebugs within the spittle and only mounted if disturbed, with the nymphal bug not making any effort to stop the pairing, an observation noted by all previous researchers. They concluded the relationship was a mostly commensal one, with only possibly facultative parasitism by the fly in times of stress.

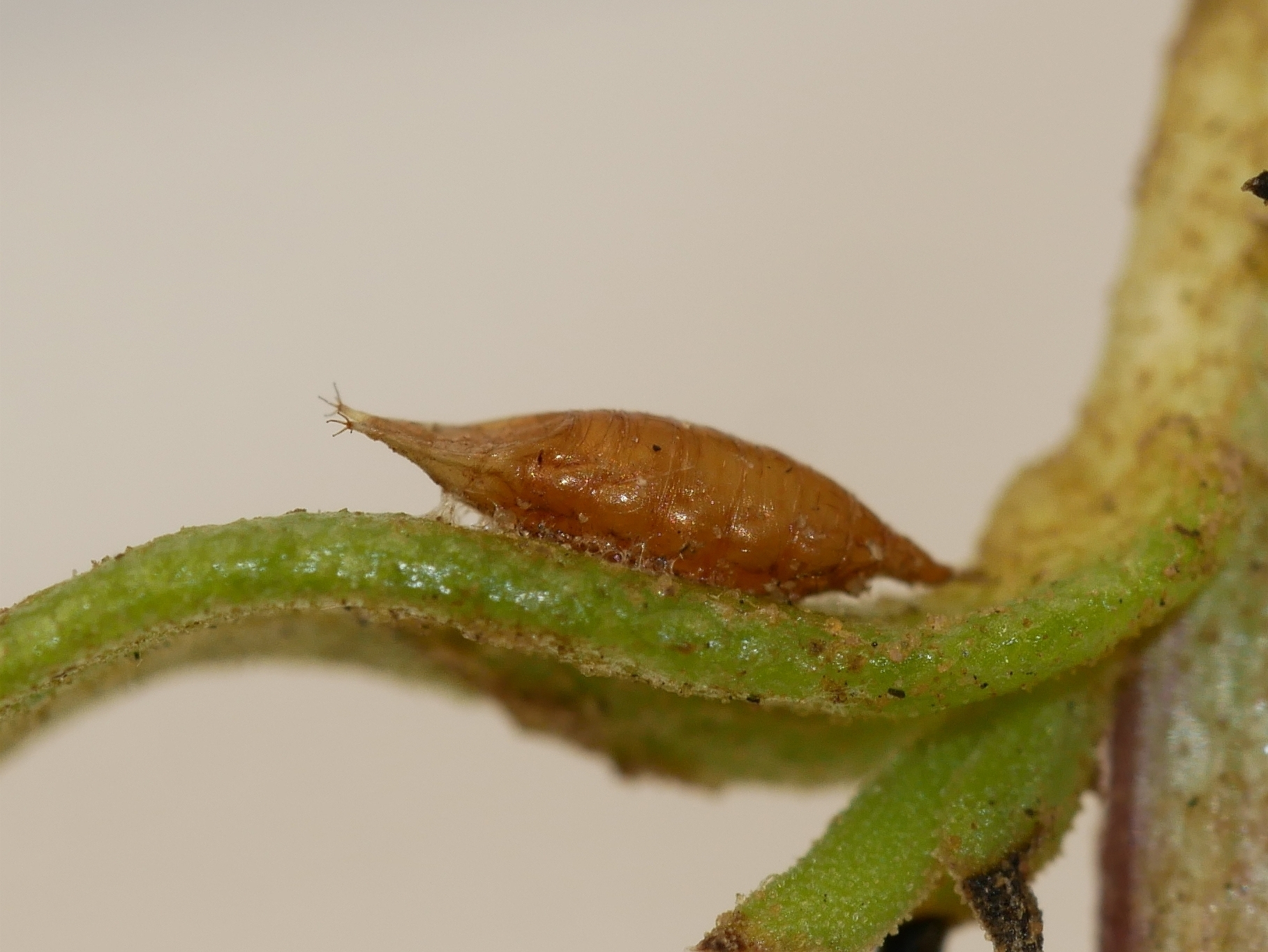
Puparium of Cladochaeta sturtevanti

Other researchers have advocated for the fly being a parasite of the spittlebug. The prominent drosophilid taxonomists Alfred Sturtevant and Marshal Wheeler believed the fly larvae to be parasites due to their inability to develop if removed from the spittle as well as the observation that they were only found in the spittle whilst attached to the bug, an account conflicting with both previous and subsequent authors. Grimaldi and Nyugen also came to this verdict. In contrast with Bennett's findings, they noted various punctures and melanized spots on the integuments of spittlebug nymphs, which were more numerous on individuals with an attached fly. They also reported a higher number of late-instar nymphs without larvae than with, and concluded the fly larvae were making punctures in the bug cuticle from which they were feeding on hemolymph, and that this likely had the effect of slowing development of the spittlebug. Notably, they did not find any dead nymphs in the field (consistent with all past authors), and surmised that if parasitism was indeed taking place it likely does not lead to the death of the host.

Spittlebug association in the Ephydroidea is not limited to Cladochaeta. Kelson reported a number of Drosophila azteca within spittle masses of Aphrophora canadensis. Individuals of Leucophenga, a typically fungus-inhabiting genus, have been variously reported from spittle of Cercopidae in Africa. Individuals of a species of Paraleucophenga was recorded in association with nymphs of Hindola viridicans, a tube spittlebug from Indonesia. Outside of Drosophilidae, Grimaldi and Nyugen reported discovery of a number of shore fly larvae in spittle of Huaina inca, an Ischnorhinid spittlebug, with similar morphology to larvae of Cladochaeta.

==== Association with non-spittlebug arthropods ====
Not all Cladochaeta are spittlebug inquilines. The young of a Brazilian species, C. atlantica, was found in egg sacs of a theridiid spider, Cryptachaea migrans. They successfully eclosed after feeding on the eggs within. This larval ecology is uncommon, but not unheard of in Drosophilidae: members of the Hawaiian subgenus Titanochaeta in the genus Scaptomyza feed on egg sacs of crab spiders. A female Cladochaeta was also once observed eclosing from the cocoon of a Notocyphus spider wasp; it was not clear however if the fly had fed on the wasp or the spider.

==== Plant-feeding ====
Some Cladochaeta are apparently herbivorous as larvae. Young of C. psychotria were reared from flowers of wild coffee, ostensibly having fed on the pollen.

== See also ==
- List of Cladochaeta species
- Epipyropidae, a family of moths which are parasitic on planthoppers yet like Cladochaeta cause comparatively little harm to their host.
