= Rhinoleucophenga =

Scientific classification
- Domain: Eukaryota
- Kingdom: Animalia
- Phylum: Arthropoda
- Class: Insecta
- Order: Diptera
- Family: Drosophilidae
- Subfamily: Steganinae
- Genus: Rhinoleucophenga; Hendel, 1917

Genus of flies

Rhinoleucophenga is a genus of fruit flies (insects in the family Drosophilidae). There are at least 20 described species in Rhinoleucophenga.

== Species ==
These 20 species belong to the genus Rhinoleucophenga:

- Rhinoleucophenga americana (Patterson, 1943)^{c g}
- Rhinoleucophenga angustifrons Malogolowkin, 1946^{c g}
- Rhinoleucophenga bezzii Duda, 1927^{c g}
- Rhinoleucophenga bivisualis (Patterson, 1943)^{c g}
- Rhinoleucophenga brasiliensis (Lima, 1950)^{c}
- Rhinoleucophenga breviplumata Duda, 1927^{c g}
- Rhinoleucophenga fluminensis (Lima, 1950)^{c g}
- Rhinoleucophenga gigantea (Thomson, 1869)^{c g}
- Rhinoleucophenga lopesi Malogolowkin, 1946^{c g}
- Rhinoleucophenga matogrossensis Malogolowkin, 1946^{c g}
- Rhinoleucophenga nigrescens Malogolowkin, 1946^{c g}
- Rhinoleucophenga obesa (Loew, 1872)^{i c g b}
- Rhinoleucophenga pallida Hendel, 1917^{c g}
- Rhinoleucophenga personata Malogolowkin, 1946^{c g}
- Rhinoleucophenga punctulata Duda, 1929^{c g}
- Rhinoleucophenga punctuloides^{g}
- Rhinoleucophenga sonoita (Wheeler, 1949)^{c g}
- Rhinoleucophenga stigma Hendel, 1917^{c g}
- Rhinoleucophenga subradiata Duda, 1929^{c g}
- Rhinoleucophenga trivisualis^{g}

Data sources: i = ITIS, c = Catalogue of Life, g = GBIF, b = Bugguide.net
