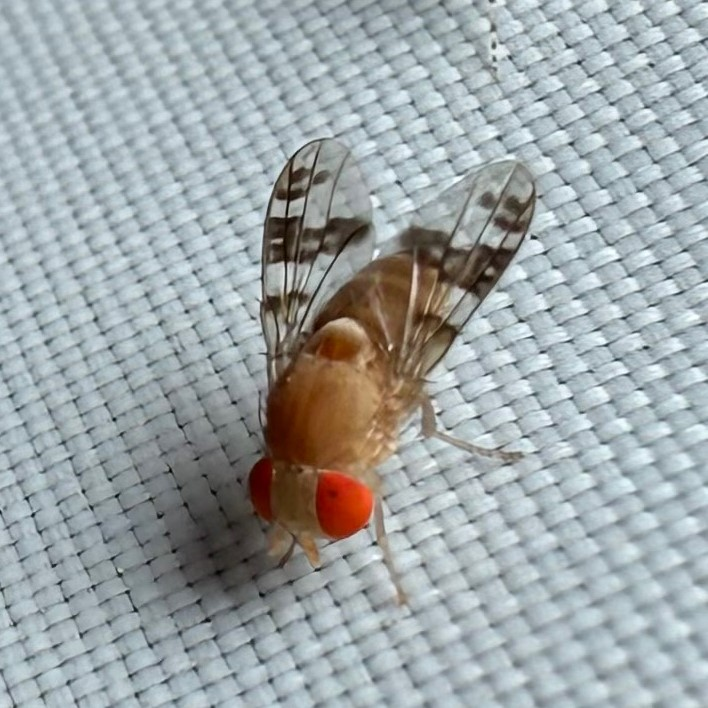
- Pseudiastata nebulosa

Scientific classification
- Kingdom: Animalia
- Phylum: Arthropoda
- Clade: Pancrustacea
- Class: Insecta
- Order: Diptera
- Family: Drosophilidae
- Subfamily: Steganinae
- Genus: Pseudiastata; Coquillett, 1908

= Pseudiastata =

Genus of flies

Pseudiastata is a genus of vinegar flies in the family Drosophilidae. There are about 11 described species in the genus Pseudiastata.

== Species ==
The following species are recognised in the genus Pseudiastata:

- Pseudiastata armata Wheeler, 1957^{c g}
- Pseudiastata australis Blanchard, 1938^{c g}
- Pseudiastata brasiliensis Costa Lima^{i c g}
- Pseudiastata nebulosa Coquillett, 1908^{i c g b}
- Pseudiastata pallida Wheeler, 1960^{c g}
- Pseudiastata pictiventris Wheeler, 1960^{i c g}
- Pseudiastata pseudococcivora Sabrosky, 1951^{c g}
- Pseudiastata vorax Sabrosky^{i c g}

Data sources: i = ITIS, c = Catalogue of Life, g = GBIF, b = Bugguide.net
