= Leucophenga maculosa =

Scientific classification
- Kingdom: Animalia
- Phylum: Arthropoda
- Class: Insecta
- Order: Diptera
- Family: Drosophilidae
- Genus: Leucophenga
- Species: L. maculosa

Binomial name
- Leucophenga maculosa (Coquillett, 1895)

Synonyms
- Drosophila maculosa Coquillett, 1895

Species of fly

Leucophenga maculosa is a species of fruit fly in the family Drosophilidae. It is found in Eastern United States.
