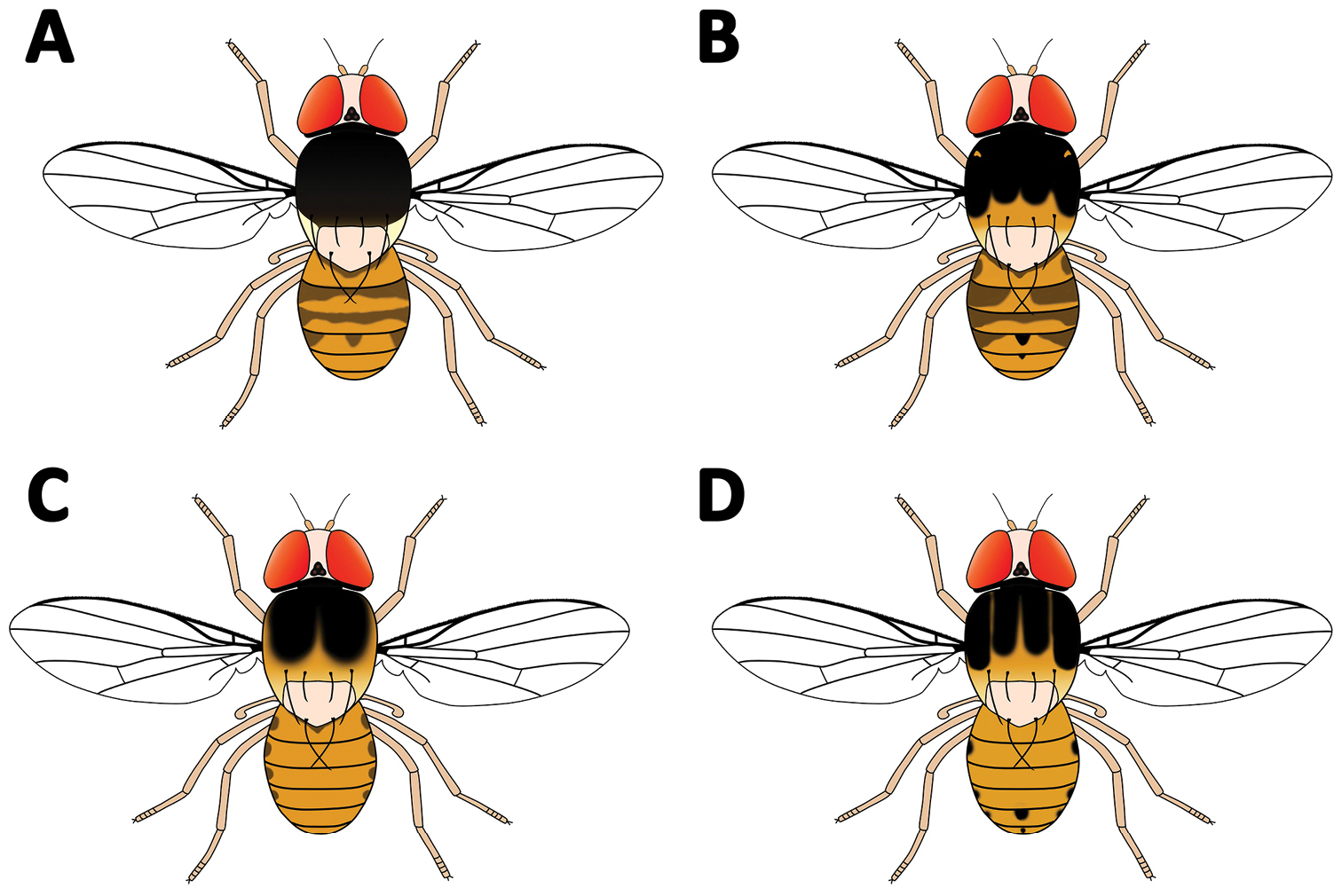
- All four known species of Acletoxenus

Scientific classification
- Kingdom: Animalia
- Phylum: Arthropoda
- Class: Insecta
- Order: Diptera
- Family: Drosophilidae
- Subfamily: Steganinae
- Tribe: Gitonini
- Genus: Acletoxenus; Frauenfeld, 1868

= Acletoxenus =

Genus of flies

Acletoxenus is a genus of fly within the family Drosophilidae. The larvae within this genus are predatory and are associated with colonies of whitefly.

== Species ==
There are currently four known species within the genus:

- Acletoxenus formosus (Loew, 1864)
- Acletoxenus indicus Malloch, 1929
- Acletoxenus meijerei Duda, 1924
- Acletoxenus quadristriatus Duda, 1936

== Lifecycle ==
A female Acletoxenus will lay an egg on a leaf close to a colony of whitefly. Once the egg hatches it will begin hunting and consuming early instars of whitefly. Larvae will glue whitefly eggs, wax and empty puparium using secreted mucus to their body, which is believed to act as camouflage. The larvae will move from leaf to leaf in search of prey and eat between 30 and 40 developing whitefly. Once ready to pupate the Acletoxenus larvae will form a pupa on the underside of a leaf. Eventually the larvae will develop into an adult fly, which emerges after breaking through a distinct lid at the head of the pupa. The fly once emerged will leave behind a translucent empty puparium.

== Parasites ==
Species of Acletoxenus are known to be extensively parasitised by parasitoid wasps such as Pachyneuron leucopiscida.
