= Stegana vittata =

Scientific classification
- Domain: Eukaryota
- Kingdom: Animalia
- Phylum: Arthropoda
- Class: Insecta
- Order: Diptera
- Family: Drosophilidae
- Genus: Stegana
- Species: S. vittata

Binomial name
- Stegana vittata (Coquillett, 1901)

Synonyms
- Phortica vittata Coquillett, 1901

Species of fly

Stegana vittata is a species of fruit fly in the family Drosophilidae.
