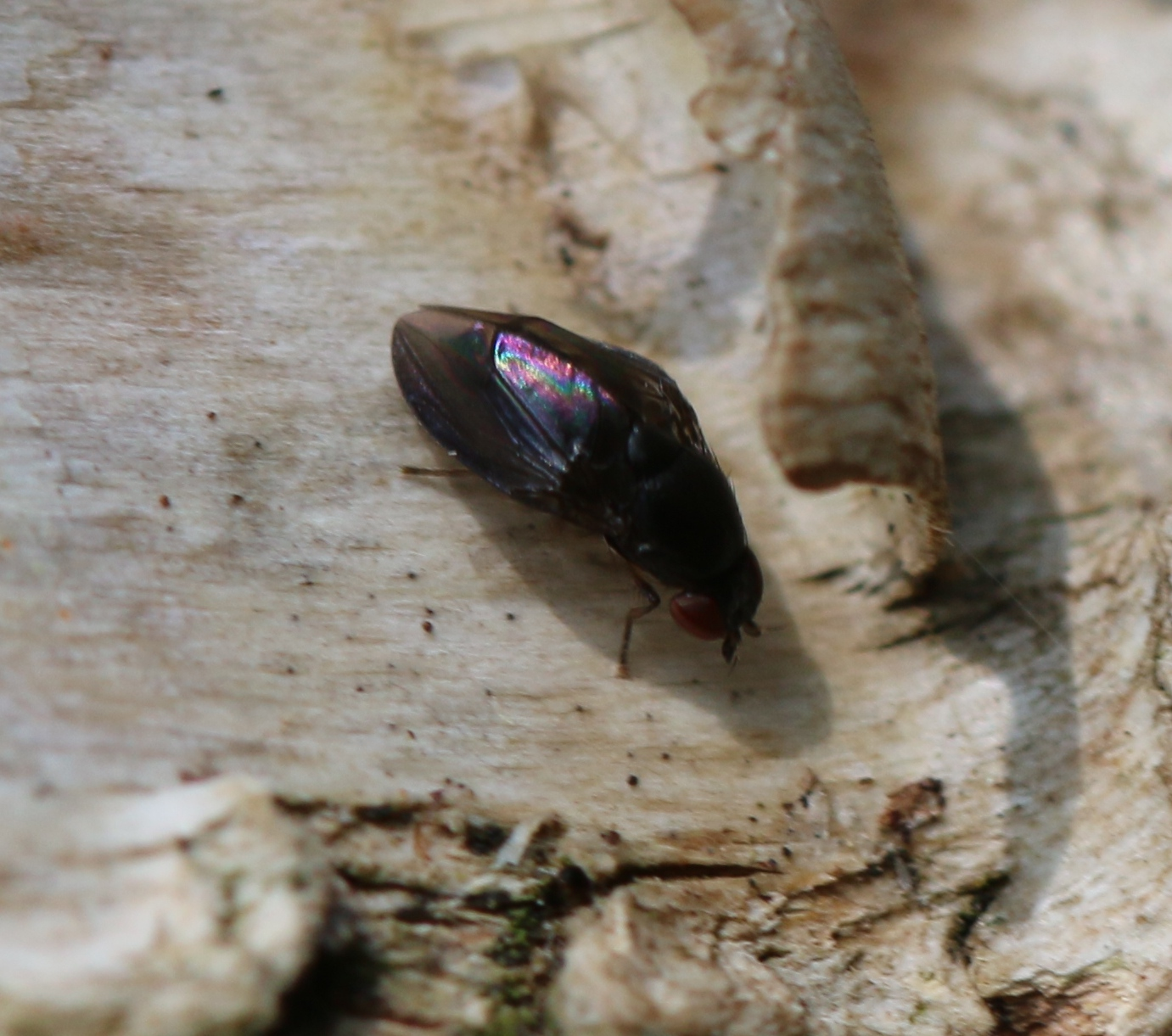

Scientific classification
- Kingdom: Animalia
- Phylum: Arthropoda
- Clade: Pancrustacea
- Class: Insecta
- Order: Diptera
- Family: Drosophilidae
- Genus: Stegana
- Species: S. coleoptrata

Binomial name
- Stegana coleoptrata (Scopoli, 1763)

= Stegana coleoptrata =

Species of fly

Stegana coleoptrata is a species of fly in the family Drosophilidae. It is found in the Palearctic.
