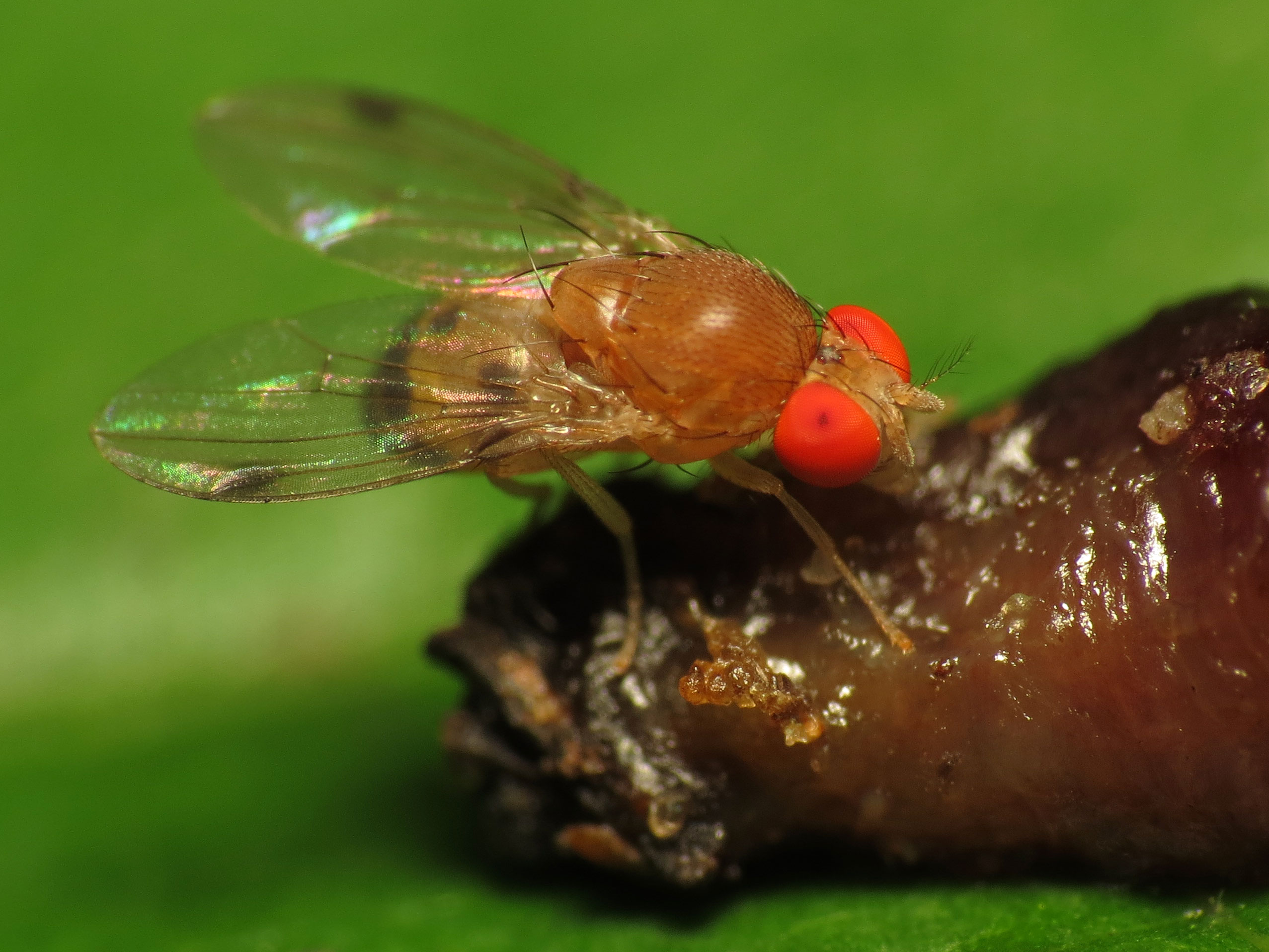

Scientific classification
- Kingdom: Animalia
- Phylum: Arthropoda
- Class: Insecta
- Order: Diptera
- Family: Drosophilidae
- Tribe: Steganini
- Subtribe: Leucophengina
- Genus: Leucophenga
- Species: L. varia

Binomial name
- Leucophenga varia (Walker, 1849)

Synonyms
- Drosophila varia Walker, 1849; Drosophila quadrimaculata Walker, 1852; Opomyza signicosta Walker, 1861

= Leucophenga varia =

Species of insect

Leucophenga varia is a species of fly in the family Drosophilidae. It occurs in North America. Unlike other Drosophilidae, it feeds on mushrooms, which has impacted the evolution of the Diptericin gene of its innate immune system.
