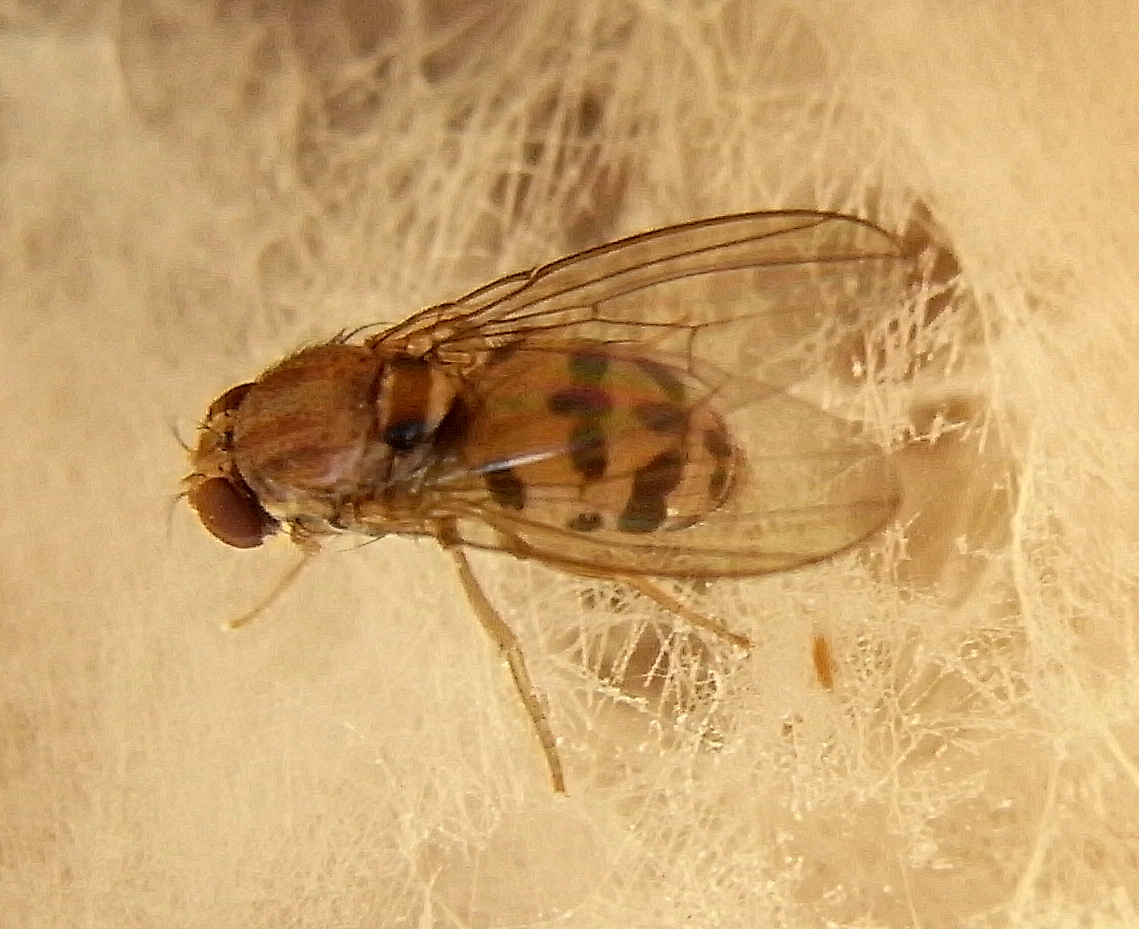
- Leucophenga maculata

Scientific classification
- Kingdom: Animalia
- Phylum: Arthropoda
- Class: Insecta
- Order: Diptera
- Family: Drosophilidae
- Genus: Leucophenga
- Species: L. maculata

Binomial name
- Leucophenga maculata (Dufour, 1839)

Synonyms
- Drosophila maculata Dufour, 1839

= Leucophenga maculata =

Species of fly

Leucophenga maculata is a European and Asian fruit fly.
