= Cladochaeta sturtevanti =

Scientific classification
- Kingdom: Animalia
- Phylum: Arthropoda
- Class: Insecta
- Order: Diptera
- Family: Drosophilidae
- Genus: Cladochaeta
- Species: C. sturtevanti

Binomial name
- Cladochaeta sturtevanti Wheeler & Takada, 1971

Species of fly

Cladochaeta sturtevanti is a species of fruit fly belonging to the family Drosophilidae.
