= Cladochaeta inversa =

Scientific classification
- Kingdom: Animalia
- Phylum: Arthropoda
- Class: Insecta
- Order: Diptera
- Family: Drosophilidae
- Genus: Cladochaeta
- Species: C. inversa

Binomial name
- Cladochaeta inversa (Walker, 1861)

Synonyms
- Drosophila inversa Walker, 1861

Species of fly

Cladochaeta inversa is a species of fruit fly in the family Drosophilidae.
