= Stegana =

Scientific classification
- Domain: Eukaryota
- Kingdom: Animalia
- Phylum: Arthropoda
- Class: Insecta
- Order: Diptera
- Family: Drosophilidae
- Subfamily: Steganinae
- Tribe: Steganini
- Subtribe: Steganina
- Genus: Stegana; Meigen, 1830

Diversity
- at least 160 species

Synonyms
- Protostegana Hendel, 1920; Gibbergana Lin, Tseng & Lee, 1977; Steganophenga Lin, Tseng & Lee, 1977

Genus of flies

Stegana is a genus of vinegar flies, insects in the family Drosophilidae. Seven species complexes have been established based on morphological data: S. biprotrusa (Chen & Aotsuka, 2004), S. castanea (Okada, 1988), S. coleoptrata (Scopoli, 1763), S. nigrolimbata (Duda, 1924), S. ornatipes (Wheeler & Takada, 1964), S. shirozui (Okada, 1971) and S. undulata (Meijere, 1911).

== See also ==
- List of Stegana species
