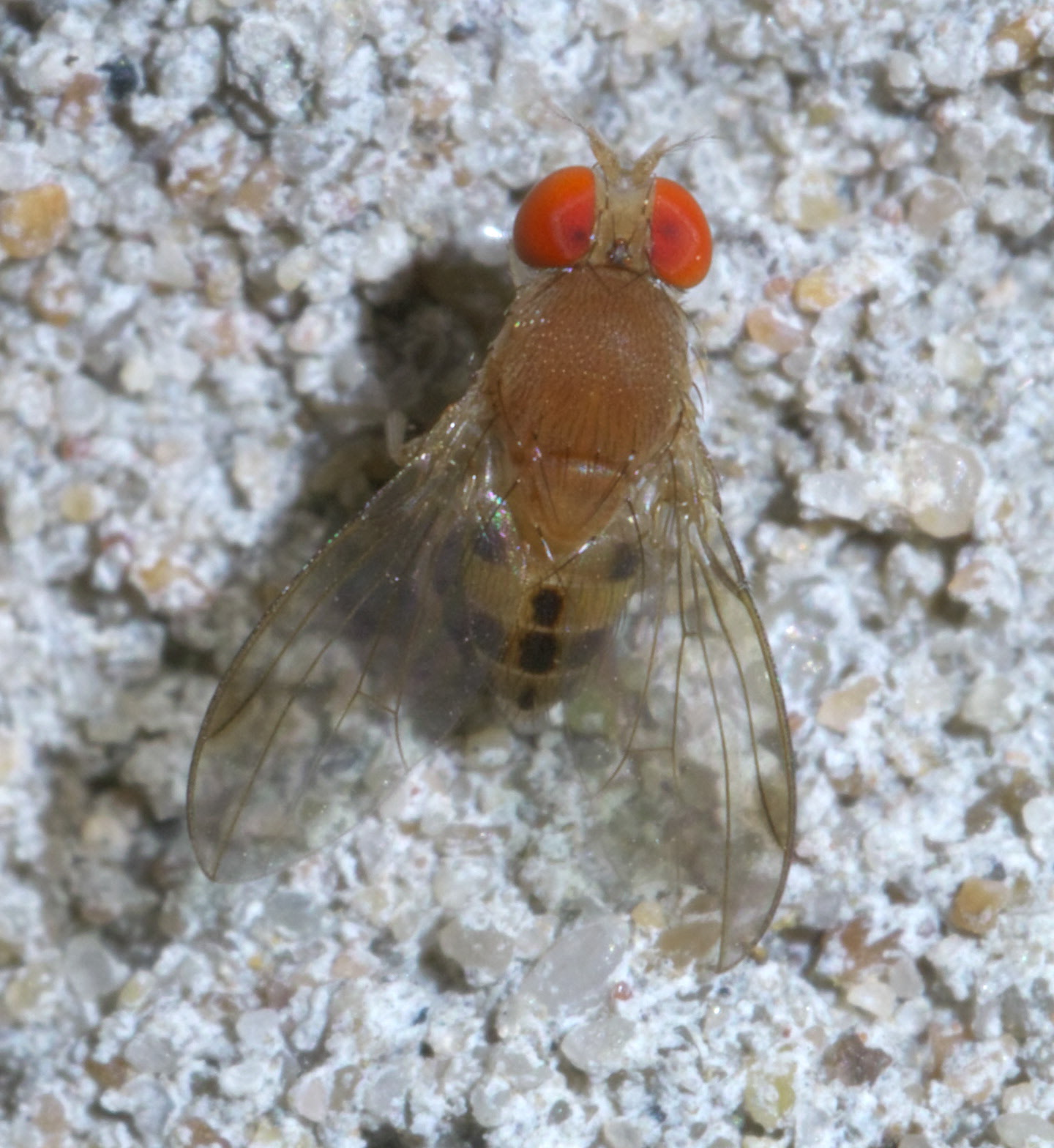
- Leucophenga varia

Scientific classification
- Domain: Eukaryota
- Kingdom: Animalia
- Phylum: Arthropoda
- Class: Insecta
- Order: Diptera
- Family: Drosophilidae
- Subfamily: Steganinae
- Tribe: Steganini
- Subtribe: Leucophengina
- Genus: Leucophenga; Mik, 1886

Diversity
- at least 250 species

= Leucophenga =

Genus of flies

Leucophenga is a genus of fruit flies (insects in the family Drosophilidae). There are at least 240 described species in Leucophenga.

== See also ==
- List of Leucophenga species
