= Invasive species in Australia =

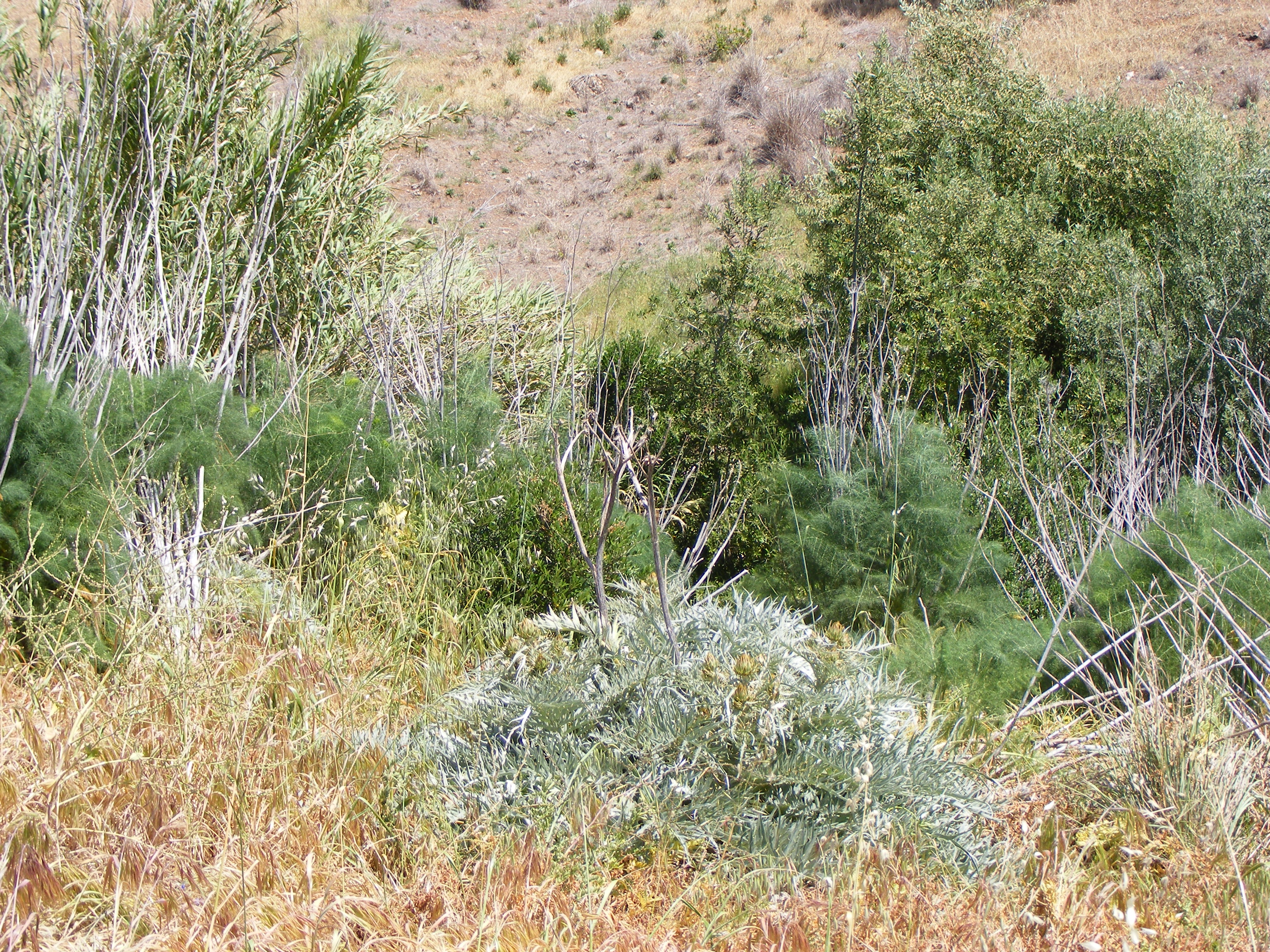
Common invasive species in the Adelaide Hills: olive, artichoke thistle, fennel and bamboo

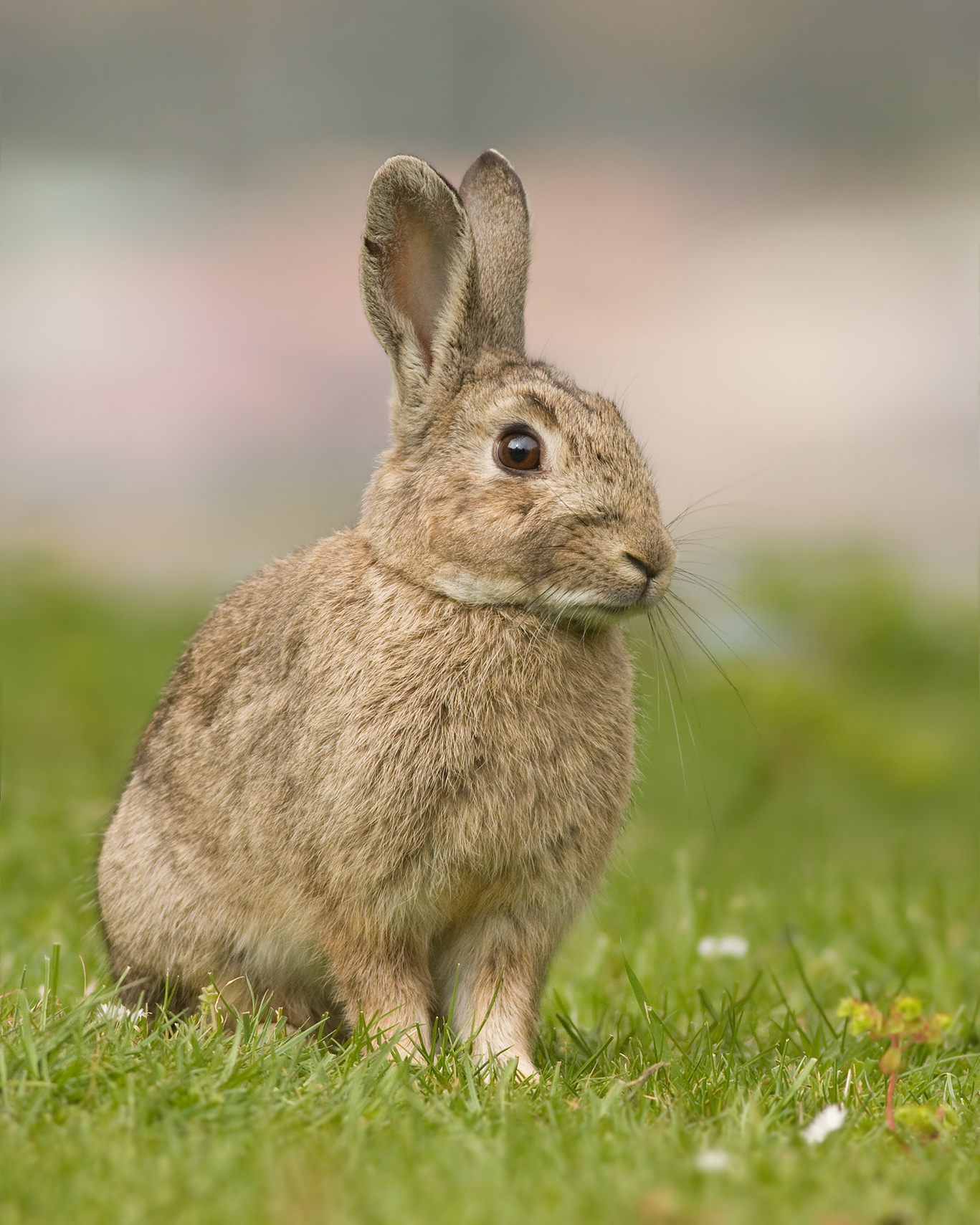
A European rabbit (Oryctolagus cuniculus) in Tasmania

Invasive species are a serious threat to endemic Australian species, and an ongoing cost to Australian agriculture. Numerous species arrived with European maritime exploration and colonisation of Australia and steadily since then.

Management and the prevention of the introduction of new invasive species are key environmental and agricultural policy issues for the Australian federal and state governments. As of 2016 the management of weeds cost A$1.5 billion on weed control and a further $2.5 billion in lost agricultural production over the course of a year.

There is ongoing debate about the potential benefits and detriments of introduced species; some experts believe that certain species, particularly megafauna such as deer, equids, bovids, and camels, may be more beneficial to Australia's ecosystems than they are detrimental, acting as replacements for extinct Australian megafauna. Additionally, species like mammalian megafaunas and European rabbit are either threatened or declining in their native ranges, and Australia may serve as an accidental refugee for such species.

== Causes ==
Both geological and climatic events helped to make Australia's flora and fauna unique. Australia was once part of the southern supercontinent Gondwana, which also included South America, Africa, Arabia, India, Antarctica and Zealandia. Gondwana began to break up 140 million years ago (mya); at 50 mya, Australia separated from Antarctica, and was relatively isolated until the collision of the Indo-Australian Plate with Asia in the Miocene epoch, 5.3 mya. As Australia drifted, it was isolated from the evolutionary pressures in the rest of the world. Other examples of island isolation include Madagascar, New Zealand, Socotra, the Galapagos and Mauritius. The geographic isolation of Australia created a sharp division between Australian fauna and Asian fauna at the Wallace line.

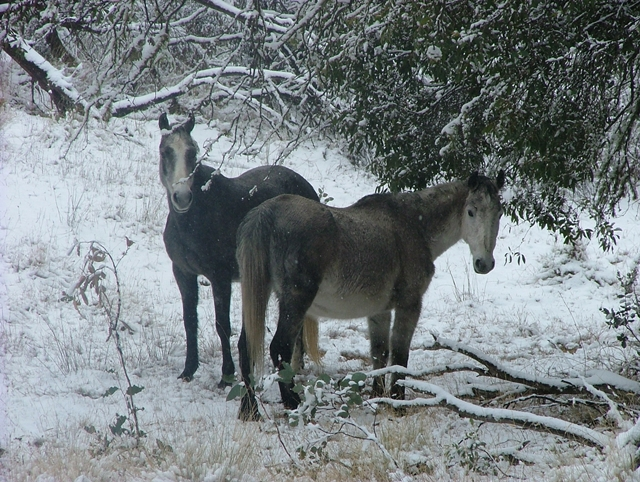
Brumbies at Snowy Wilderness retreat in Jindabyne, New South Wales, 2003

Humans arrived in Australia between 80,000 and 45,000 years ago, living alongside megafauna for 20,000–25,000 years before the megafaunal extinctions that were likely caused by, or partly contributed to by, late Pleistocene climate change; however, the full reason for the extinctions is still unclear and human hunting or habitat changes through fire-stick farming may also have contributed to the extinctions. This left Australia with much of its keystone species extinct, leaving the ecosystems altered and far more vulnerable to invasion.

Dingoes probably arrived in Australia between 5,400 and 4,600 years ago, long after the first humans, spread rapidly across the continent and probably contributed to the extinction of even more native species such as the thylacine and Tasmanian devil. The current period of invasive species introduction began in 1788 with the arrival of the first European settlers. The population density in Australia beyond the coastline and major cities has been very low since the arrival of European settlers, and there are large tracts of land where it is very difficult for people to manage even large feral animals like camels, horses, donkeys and water buffalos.

== Invasive species ==
=== Fungi and bacteria ===
Invasive fungi and bacteria in Australia affect many native plants and animals and agricultural crops. Citrus canker was found twice in the Northern Territory in the 1900s, and was eradicated each time. In 2004, an outbreak of citrus canker occurred in Australia, and many Queensland citrus orchards have been burned to remove the disease. The destruction worked; however, the disease was once again detected in April 2018 and confirmed in May 2018 in Northern Territory and Western Australia. The oomycete Phytophthora cinnamomi, commonly known as wildflower dieback or jarrah blight, has created a massive problem in some types of native vegetation – especially jarrah forest and banksia woodland.

=== Animals ===
Australia is host to 56 introduced invasive vertebrate animal species. They can be categorised in the following ways:

- Invasive – species has a tendency to spread their range into new areas or plague their range
- Ferals – defined as animals imported for domestic purposes (i.e. pets, recreational use – such as hunting – or beasts of burden) that have gone wild.
- Pests – animals that have a direct effect on human standard of living or the environment/ecosystems in areas where they are present, have a high rate of reproduction and are difficult to control

Animals causing most public concern and economic and ecological damage include:

Image	Species	Introduced	Reason	Introduced from	Distribution	Threat level	Estimated proliferation	Main control measures	Notes / ref
	Cat (Felis catus)	1770	Pest control and later as pets	England	Everywhere except the declared cat free islands	Extreme	11 million (5.3 million domestic)	Barrier fencing, shooting, trapping, toxic pellet implants. Control measures effective on small islands; less so on the mainland.	Cats have contributed to the extinction of many species of mammals and birds.
	European rabbit (Oryctolagus cuniculus)	1857	Recreational hunting	Europe	Throughout Australia (extensive)	Extreme	200 million +	Rabbit-proof fence; Myxomatosis; Calicivirus (RHD)	Prolific breeders that destroy land.
	Red imported fire ants (Solenopsis invicta)	2001	Accidental	Southern USA	South East Queensland	Extreme	Unknown	Movement controls for specific organic materials in fire ant biosecurity zones.	Threat to human way of life, endangered bird and turtle species and ecological threat through competition with native insects and plants.
	Cane toad (Rhinella marina)	1935	Biological control (cane beetle)	Americas via Hawaii	Queensland (extensive), the Northern Rivers (New South Wales), the Top End (Northern Territory), the Kimberley	Extreme	200 million +	Culling; trapping; genetic (under research)	Prolific breeders and bufotoxin kills native animals
	Red fox (Vulpes vulpes)	1855	Recreational hunting	Europe	most of mainland Australia; small numbers in Tasmania	Extreme	7.2 million +	1080 baiting; hunting	Elusive prolific predator of native animals and livestock.
	Tropical fire ants (Solenopsis geminata)	1800	Accidental	South America	Western Australia and Northern Territory	Major	Unknown	Chemical baiting	
	Feral goat (Capra hircus)	1840	Domestic livestock	Great Britain, Europe and Asia	Throughout Australia (extensive)	High	more than 2.6 million in 1996	Aerial and Ground shooting, mustering and trapping	
	Feral pig (Sus scrofa)	1788	Domestic livestock	Europe	Throughout Australia, except in deserts (extensive)	High	up to 23.5 million in 2011	Musters, ground and helicopter culling, trapping, poisoning, fencing	Prolific breeders that destroy land and have the potential to spread disease
	Feral donkey (Equus asinus)	1866	Pack and haulage animals	Europe	Throughout Australia (extensive)	Medium to high	up to 5 million in 2005	Musters, ground and helicopter culling, fertility control	Grazers that damage sensitive lands
	Dromedary camel (Camelus dromedarius)	1840	Beast of burden	India	Outback	Medium to high	300,000 in 2013	Helicopter culling	Grazer, though arid Australian conditions suit the camel perfectly.
	Brumby (Equus ferus caballus)	1788	Farm and utility work	Europe; some later imports from South Africa and Indonesia	Throughout Australia (extensive)	Medium to high	more than 300 thousand	Musters, ground and helicopter culling, fertility control	Grazers that damage sensitive lands
	Banteng (Bos javanicus)	1849	Domestic livestock	Indonesia	Garig Gunak Barlu National Park	Medium	8,000 - 10,000	Hunting	Environmental damage – soil erosion, channelling of floodwaters, increased intrusion of saltwater into freshwater habitats and destruction of wetland vegetation.
	Common ostrich (Struthio camelus)	1980s	Farming for meat, feathers, oil and eggs	South Africa	Found only in outback South Australia near the Birdsville Track	Medium	20,000	None due to them being rare in Australia.	All wild ostriches in Australia are descendants of escaped farmed populations in the 1980s. Only one ostrich farm is active in Australia now, Hastings Ostrich Farm in Victoria
	Water buffalo (Bubalus bubalis)	1829	Domestic livestock	Indonesia	Top End	Medium	150,000 in 2008	Hunting	Environmental damage – soil erosion, channelling of floodwaters, increased intrusion of saltwater into freshwater habitats and destruction of wetland vegetation.
	Eastern gray squirrel (Sciurus carolinensis)	Melbourne (1880), Adelaide (1920), Ballarat (1920, 1937)	Zoos and pets	North America	Feral populations formerly localised populations in urban areas of Melbourne, Adelaide and Ballarat (until 1922)	Eradicted	-	-	
	Northern palm squirrel (Funambulus pennantii)	Perth (1989), Sydney (1920s)	Zoos and pets	India	Perth (feral); New South Wales (pets); Feral populations formerly localised populations in urban areas of Sydney (until 1976) and Perth (until 2018)	Eradicated	-	-	
	Blackbuck (Antilope cervicapra)	1900s (Western Australia); 1980s or 1990s (Queensland)	Livestock	India	Western Australia; Formerly present in Cape York, Queensland	Eradicated	-	Shooting	Eradicated from Queensland in the 1990s.

==== Control ====
Various programs exist to control invasive species in Australia. A cane toad control program aims at preventing the spread of the species towards Darwin and Western Australia, and involves trapping. Red Foxes, feral cats, feral dogs and feral pigs are often baited, although the use of 1080 (sodium fluoroacetate) is also known to affect native animals such as the quoll and Tasmanian devil, though the most common and effective method is shooting. 1080 is ideal in the south-west of Australia because a native plant contains the same toxin – therefore most native animals have developed immunity to it. Other species are either open to hunting as a sport (such as the deer) or subject to government sponsored culling programs. Dromedary Camels and Water buffalo are often shot from helicopters.

==== Bounties ====
Several bounty programs have assisted in the eradication of larger sized pests in Australia.

Ironically, many early bounties were paid for the extermination of native species that were considered a pest to farmers. The Tasmanian tiger or thylacine was one such program that caused extinction, whilst the Tasmanian devil, spotted quoll, and Tasmanian wedge-tailed eagle all became seriously threatened by bounties.

At various times, bounties have been in place for invasive species such as wild-living domestic dogs (including the dingo) and fox. A beer-for-toads bounty has been publicised for cane toad control in the Northern Territory.

In 2002, a Victorian Fox Bounty Trial began to test the efficacy of fox bounties which have been in place intermittently since 1893 (only 30 years after introduction). The study showed no reduction in fox impacts, and that the project may even have been counterproductive. The evaluation also found that a sustained annual reduction of 65% is required to achieve real declines in red fox populations.

Feral cat bounties in Queensland have also been considered to counter the growing problem. The dingo is subject to various controversial bounty systems in Australia. The Australian dingo was itself introduced before European settlement, yet has been considered native of the mainland in most cases both the pure breeds and the dingo-dog hybrids are considered pests to livestock.

==== Invasive insects and terrestrial arthropods ====
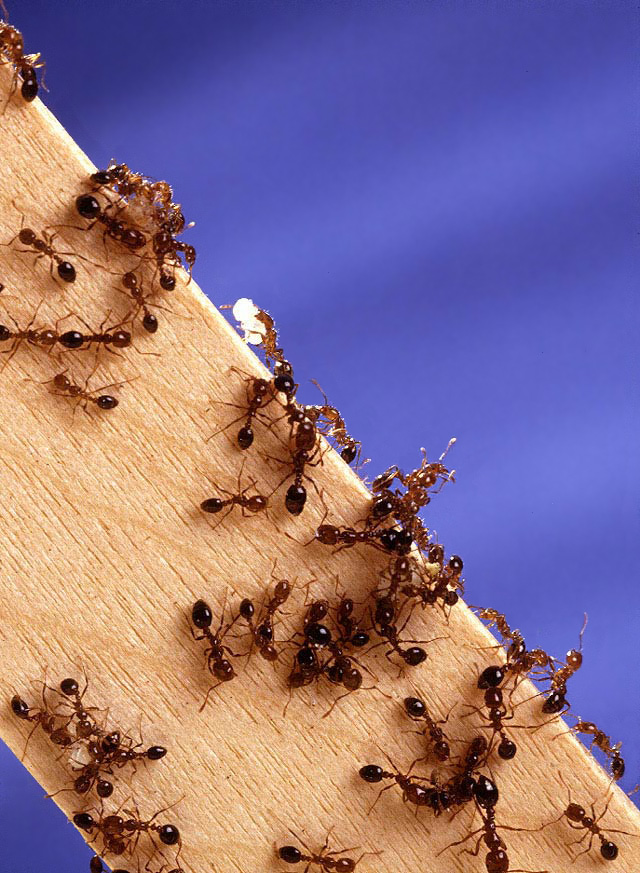
Red imported fire ants

Insects are the second costliest class of invasive species in Australia, behind only the mammals. Fire ants in Australia (Solenopsis invicta) are estimated to cost A$1.72 billion (2021) (equivalent to A$1.83 billion or US$1.33 billion in 2022) annually, making up 71% of the total costs of invasive insects. This is followed by the Queensland fruit fly (Bactrocera tryoni) making up 12% of the total costs, the Pacific fruit fly (B. philippinensis) making up 9%, and the bollworm (Helicoverpa) making up 7%.

Yellow crazy ants (Anoplolepis gracilipes), black Portuguese millipedes (Ommatoiulus moreletii), Western honey bees (Apis mellifera), and European wasps (Vespula germanica; known elsewhere by the common name "German wasps") are considered to be problematic species. The elm leaf beetle (Xanthogaleruca luteola), discovered in Victoria in 1989, devastates exotic elm trees, themselves imported, and a parasite wasp species as well as the beetle's natural enemy the parasitic fly (Erynniopsis antennata) were in turn introduced in 2001 in an effort to control the pest.

==== Control ====
The red imported fire ant in particular, with its venomous stings, poses a direct threat to human lifestyle. Although control is extremely difficult and spread quickly, the species is currently effectively quarantined to South East Queensland.

Both the honey bee and European wasp are well established and now impossible to eradicate in Australia. Honey bees take over potential nesting hollows for native animals and are very hard to remove once established.

The yellow crazy ant is currently quarantined to Christmas Island where it has had a significant environmental impact. The primary impact is the killing and displacing of crabs on the forest floor.

==== Invasive birds ====
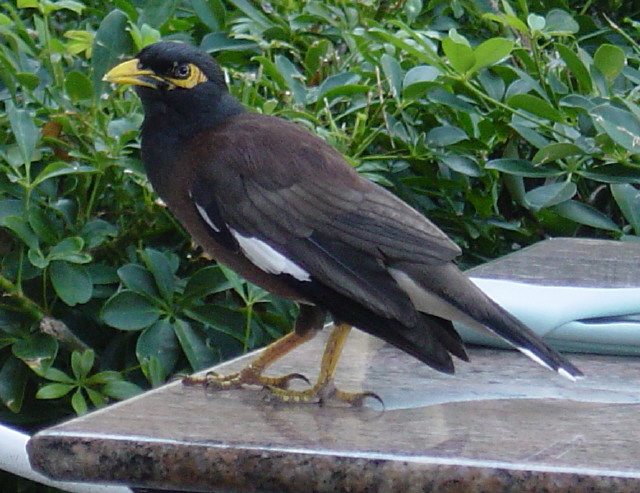
Common myna

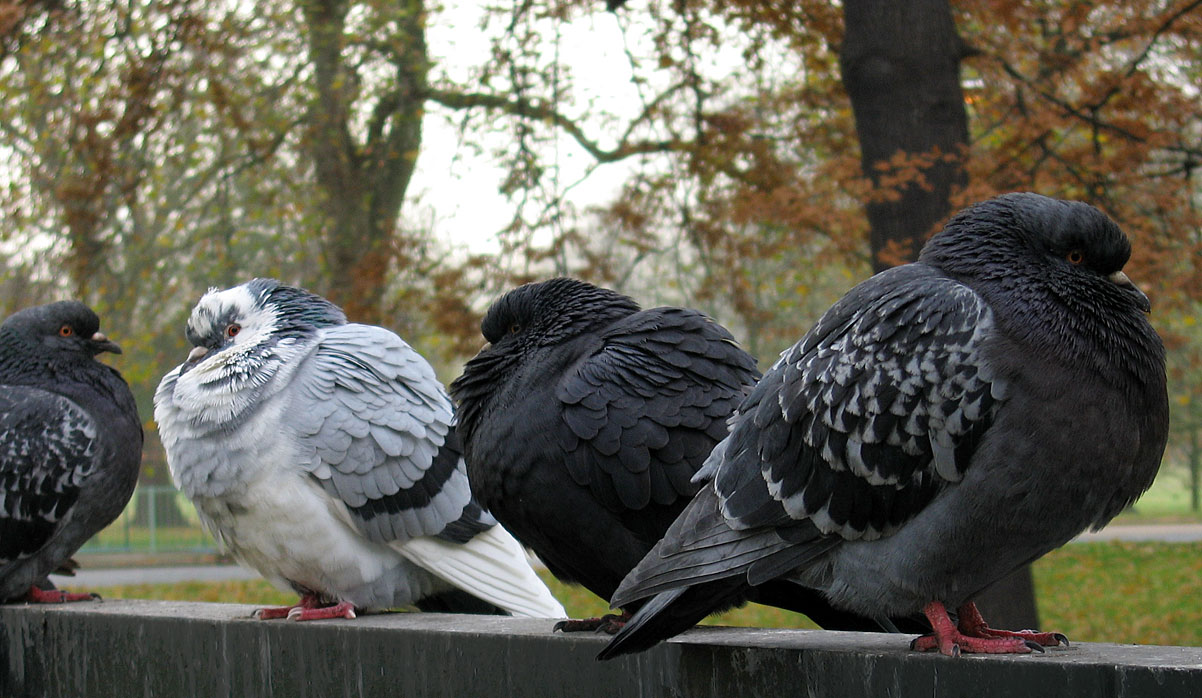
Feral rock pigeons are common pests in public spaces in cities

Introduced birds considered pests include the common myna, the common starling, the spotted dove and rock pigeon (common pigeon).

Initially introduced to control locust plagues, the common myna breeds prolifically in urban environments in the eastern states. The myna poses a serious threat (such that it has been listed in the World Conservation Union's world's 100 worst invasive species). The bird has caused human health concerns due to the spread of mites and disease. It has also been known to force native birds and their eggs from their nests.

The rock pigeon in particular has acidic faeces and can damage human property, including historic stone buildings.

==== Control ====
Historically, control programs have struggled to curb the expansion and proliferation of invasive bird populations in Australia. A new program in Canberra has reversed this trend regarding mynas. Since 2006, the Canberra Indian Myna Action Group (CIMAG) has implemented an effective control scheme, based upon large-scale trapping conducted by volunteers. As of June 2013, the Action Group has recorded over 45,000 myna captures in the Canberra region since 2006. This has reduced the myna's prevalence in the Canberra region from a ranking of third most prevalent bird species in 2006, to twentieth in 2012. This has correlated with anecdotal evidence of increased nesting activity and prevalence of native species in the Canberra region. Other volunteer organisations in Australia have begun to adopt the CIMAG model with similar success.

Starlings and sparrows are currently closely monitored in south-eastern Western Australia.

Despite the number of rock pigeons, many people continue to feed the birds bread crumbs and assist them to breed in great numbers. It is not illegal to feed pigeons in Australia, and many local proposals to cull pigeons have been rejected.

Programs promoting indigenous plantations to attract native birds are an alternative method of promoting native species rejuvenation though this has caused issues with the explosion in the noisy miner population.

==== Invasive freshwater fish species ====
Invasive freshwater fish species in Australia include carp, brown trout, rainbow trout, redfin perch, mosquitofish (Gambusia spp), weather loach, and spotted tilapia among others. Some introduced freshwater fish species have had devastating impacts on Australia's endemic freshwater fish species and other native aquatic life. For example, in much of south eastern Australia's freshwater systems introduced carp (often incorrectly called "European" carp) dominate the lowland reaches, while introduced trout species almost completely dominate the upland reaches. While the damaging impact of carp is well recognised, little in the way of control measures have been employed to control their spread. Their ability to colonise almost any body of water, even those previously considered to be beyond their physical tolerances, is now well established.

==== Invasive marine species ====
Marine pests have been carried to Australia in the ballast water of cargo ships. Marine pests include the black-striped mussel (Mytilopsis sallei), the Asian mussel, the New Zealand green-lipped mussel, and the European shore crab. The Northern Pacific seastar in Tasmania, Inverloch, and Port Phillip has caused much localised environmental damage.

=== Invasive plant species ===
Weeds invade natural landscapes, waterways, and agricultural land. Originally, plants were most likely to be considered weeds if they had a direct economic impact, especially on agricultural production. However, growing environmental consciousness since the 1970s has led to the recognition of environmental weeds; plants which have adverse effects on the natural ecosystem of an area. A list of Weeds of National Significance (WONS) was created in 1999 and updated in 2012 and now has 32 taxa.

Not just the prickly pear: Hudson's Pears - Cylindropuntia tunicata and C. rosea - are also cacti of agricultural significance in Queensland.

Weed management costs the Australian economy A$4 billion yearly; weeds are considered the second greatest threat to biodiversity after land clearing. Almost half of Australia's 220 declared noxious weeds (under legislation) were introduced deliberately, one third of these as garden ornamentals.

== Management of invasive species ==
The management of invasive species is carried out by individuals, conservation groups, and government agencies.

The Australian Quarantine and Inspection Service is responsible for ensuring that no new species with the potential to become invasive species enter Australia. To raise public awareness, Australian Quarantine has featured Australian celebrity nature lover Steve Irwin on a series of television commercials, with the message Quarantine – Don't mess with it.

Several scientific bodies are involved in research for the control of invasive species. The CSIRO has released several successful biological pest control agents and developed chemical agents for pest and weed control. For example, the CSIRO released myxoma virus to control wild rabbits in Australia. Rabbit haemorrhagic disease escaped containment from an Australian Government research facility and spread across Australia. Rabbit hemorrhagic disease was subsequently legalised for the control of wild rabbits. The moth Cactoblastis cactorum was introduced for the control of prickly pear, and the salvinia weevil Cyrtobagous salviniae for the control of aquatic weed Salvinia. More doubtful biological controls were the cane toad, which was introduced to control the sugar cane destroying cane beetle; instead the cane toad ate anything and everything else—the beetle was not its preferred food source given choice. The cane toad in Australia has become the biological control that is most infamous for having been a complete failure as well as becoming an environmental nightmare. Walter Froggatt, an economic entomologist, warned of this likelihood at the time. It has also led to much public concern and caution when considering the introduction of new biological controls.

Another example of a poorly researched introduced biological control is the sap sucking lantana bug (Aconophora compressa) also from South America that was introduced into Australia in the 1995 to eat the lantana. Unfortunately, the lantana bug also attacks other trees including fiddlewood trees which has caused distress to some gardeners. The lantana bug had been tested for six years on 62 different plants. Aconophora compressa was the 28th insect introduced to control lantana in about 80 years.

More successfully, the Australian Dung Beetle Project (1965–1985), led by Dr. George Bornemissza of CSIRO's Division of Entomology, introduced 23 species of dung beetle to Australia in order to biologically control the pestilent population of bush flies. These flies, along with other species of fly and parasitic worm, use the dung as a breeding and feeding ground. The rolling and burying activity of the dung beetles means that the dung is removed from the pasture land, which had the effect of reducing the bush fly population by 90%, as well increasing soil fertility and quality by recycling the dung back into the soil.

Cooperative Research Centres for weed management and pest animal control, have been established by the federal government. They coordinate research and funding between a number of university and government labs for research into control of invasive species.

Non-governmental organisations have also been established to fight invasive species, for example, the Invasive Species Council (ISC). The ISC are a policy, advocacy, lobbying, research, and outreach group on matters related invasive species.

Volunteer groups, such as SPRATS, have also made very significant contributions to fighting invasive species, in their case removing sea spurge from large areas of Tasmanian coastline.

== Claimed ecological benefits ==
While negative impacts by introduced flora and fauna are often featured, some researchers argue that there could be positive aspects of introduced species to provide ecological benefits to native ecosystem in Australia.

Herbivores in general may benefit local biodiversity by creating mosaics of vegetation and helping native plants to expand their ranges, and may contribute to decline wildfires; mega-herbivores most notably the feral camels may fill lost ecological niches of extinct Australian megafauna including Diprotodon and Palorchestes, where this may also apply for others (such as cattles and horses and donkeys and deers), and would also drop fire risk, and smaller herbivores such as hog deer or feral goats may also suppress introduced grasses and wildfires.

Introduced red foxes or cats are among the most harmful introduced predators in Australia, although studies have been insufficient to verify the actual extents of biodiversity loss by them, along with their potential contributions in suppressing the number of rats – and rabbits.

== Economic impact ==
A 2021 study looking at the economic impact of invasive species estimated that invasive species had cost Australian farmers A$390 billion in the past 60 years, with feral cats way ahead of the pack at nearly A$19 billion. Rabbits are next, at around A$2 billion, followed by fire ants, annual ryegrass, pigs, parthenium, foxes, ragwort, cucumis melons, and common heliotrope.

== World Trade Organisation and Australia's quarantine regulations ==
The World Trade Organisation-specified quarantine regulations are weaker than Australia's fairly stringent regulations controlling the importing of raw produce. Following Australia's membership of the WTO, many forms of raw produce once banned have commenced import, with potentially adverse effects and controversy; for example, regarding proposals to import apples from New Zealand or bananas from the Philippines.

Australian quarantine regulations such as those limiting banana imports from developing economies have been recognised as protectionist trade barriers by economists including Kevin Fox, head of Economics at the Australian School of Business.

The weakening of restrictions on importing raw produce into Australia mandated by the World Trade Organisation Future may pose risks of introducing exotic disease organisms. Case examples include, chytrid fungus that is threatening numerous Australian frog species with extinction and mass pilchards deaths in the Southern Ocean from 1995 onwards that are suspected to have been caused by a virus that may have been brought in with imported pilchards.

== See also ==
- Invasive species in New Zealand
- Environmental issues in Australia
- Fauna of Australia
- List of invasive plant species in New South Wales
- Where Do Camels Belong?
- Barry Green (hunter)
