= Vitex urceolata =

Conservation status
- Vulnerable (IUCN 2.3)

Scientific classification
- Kingdom: Plantae
- Clade: Tracheophytes
- Clade: Angiosperms
- Clade: Eudicots
- Clade: Asterids
- Order: Lamiales
- Family: Lamiaceae
- Genus: Vitex
- Species: V. urceolata

Binomial name
- Vitex urceolata C.B. Clarke

Species of tree

Vitex urceolata is a species of plant in the family Lamiaceae. It is a tree endemic to Peninsular Malaysia. It is threatened by habitat loss.
