= Vitex kuylenii =

Conservation status
- Endangered (IUCN 2.3)

Scientific classification
- Kingdom: Plantae
- Clade: Tracheophytes
- Clade: Angiosperms
- Clade: Eudicots
- Clade: Asterids
- Order: Lamiales
- Family: Lamiaceae
- Genus: Vitex
- Species: V. kuylenii

Binomial name
- Vitex kuylenii Standl.

Species of flowering plant

Vitex kuylenii is a species of plant in the family Lamiaceae. It is found in Belize, Guatemala, Honduras, Mexico, and Nicaragua.
