= Fiddlewood =

Fiddlewood is a common name for several plants and may refer to:

- Citharexylum, native to the Americas
- Vitex divaricata, white fiddlewood, native to Puerto Rico and the US Virgin Islands
- Vitex gaumeri, native to Central America
