= Vitex evoluta =

Conservation status
- Endangered (IUCN 2.3)

Scientific classification
- Kingdom: Plantae
- Clade: Tracheophytes
- Clade: Angiosperms
- Clade: Eudicots
- Clade: Asterids
- Order: Lamiales
- Family: Lamiaceae
- Genus: Vitex
- Species: V. evoluta

Binomial name
- Vitex evoluta Däniker

Species of flowering plant

Vitex evoluta is a species of plant in the family Lamiaceae. It is endemic to New Caledonia. Like other members of its genus, it is a woody shrub or small tree, and it forms part of the island's unique and highly diverse native flora. The species has a restricted distribution and is considered rare, making it of interest for local conservation efforts.
