= Vitex ajugaeflora =

Conservation status
- Vulnerable (IUCN 2.3)

Scientific classification
- Kingdom: Plantae
- Clade: Tracheophytes
- Clade: Angiosperms
- Clade: Eudicots
- Clade: Asterids
- Order: Lamiales
- Family: Lamiaceae
- Genus: Vitex
- Species: V. ajugaeflora

Binomial name
- Vitex ajugaeflora Dop

Species of flowering plant

Vitex ajugaeflora is a species of plant in the family Lamiaceae. It is endemic to Vietnam.
