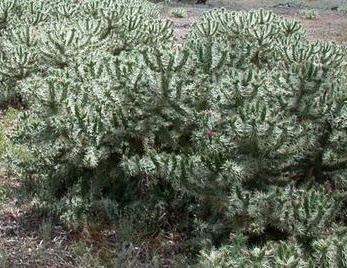

Conservation status
- Data Deficient (IUCN 3.1)

Scientific classification
- Kingdom: Plantae
- Clade: Embryophytes
- Clade: Tracheophytes
- Clade: Angiosperms
- Clade: Eudicots
- Order: Caryophyllales
- Family: Cactaceae
- Genus: Cylindropuntia
- Species: C. rosea

Binomial name
- Cylindropuntia rosea (DC.) Backeb.

= Cylindropuntia rosea =

Species of cactus

Cylindropuntia rosea, the Hudson pear, is a cactus native to the Sonoran Desert in Arizona and Northwestern Mexico. The plant is an invasive species in Australia.

== Description ==
Cylindropuntia rosea, the Hudson pear, has pink flowers and white spines. It has long, white, strong spines and can grow up to 1.5 m high and 3 m wide.

It is very similar to Cylindropuntia tunicata which also grows in the same region and has yellow and straw-coloured flowers.

== Invasive plant species in Australia ==
Hudson pear is an intentionally introduced species to Australia, where it has become an invasive species and noxious weed. It has spread from the opal fields around Lightning Ridge in New South Wales, occupying some 60,000 hectares around Lightning Ridge, Brewarrina, Broken Hill, Baradine, Coonamble, and Goodooga, New South Wales and is also found in Western Australia and Queensland. The plant is spread by stem pieces, and possibly by fruits, that have attached to rubber tyres and shoes. Animals are particularly at risk from injury caused by the spines.

Investigations are also being made into the possible use of a biological control agent. The Lightning Ridge Miners Association has been supplying backpacks of herbicide to miners for use where they work and live. Spraying has reduced the occurrence of this plant in the Lightning Ridge area, but constant follow-up spraying will be needed for further control. The New South Wales Government has spent $200,000 on management of this weed.
