= Vitex longisepala =

Conservation status
- Least Concern (IUCN 3.1)

Scientific classification
- Kingdom: Plantae
- Clade: Tracheophytes
- Clade: Angiosperms
- Clade: Eudicots
- Clade: Asterids
- Order: Lamiales
- Family: Lamiaceae
- Genus: Vitex
- Species: V. longisepala

Binomial name
- Vitex longisepala King & Gamble

Species of tree

Vitex longisepala is a species of plant in the family Lamiaceae. It is a tree endemic to Peninsular Malaysia.
