= Vitex peduncularis =

Conservation status
- Least Concern (IUCN 3.1)

Scientific classification
- Kingdom: Plantae
- Clade: Embryophytes
- Clade: Tracheophytes
- Clade: Angiosperms
- Clade: Eudicots
- Clade: Asterids
- Order: Lamiales
- Family: Lamiaceae
- Genus: Vitex
- Species: V. peduncularis

Binomial name
- Vitex peduncularis Wall. ex Schauer

Species of tree

Vitex peduncularis is a species of plant in the family Lamiaceae. It is found in Southeast and South Asia, including in China (southern Yunnan), Cambodia, Bangladesh, India, Laos, Myanmar, Nepal, Thailand, and Vietnam.
