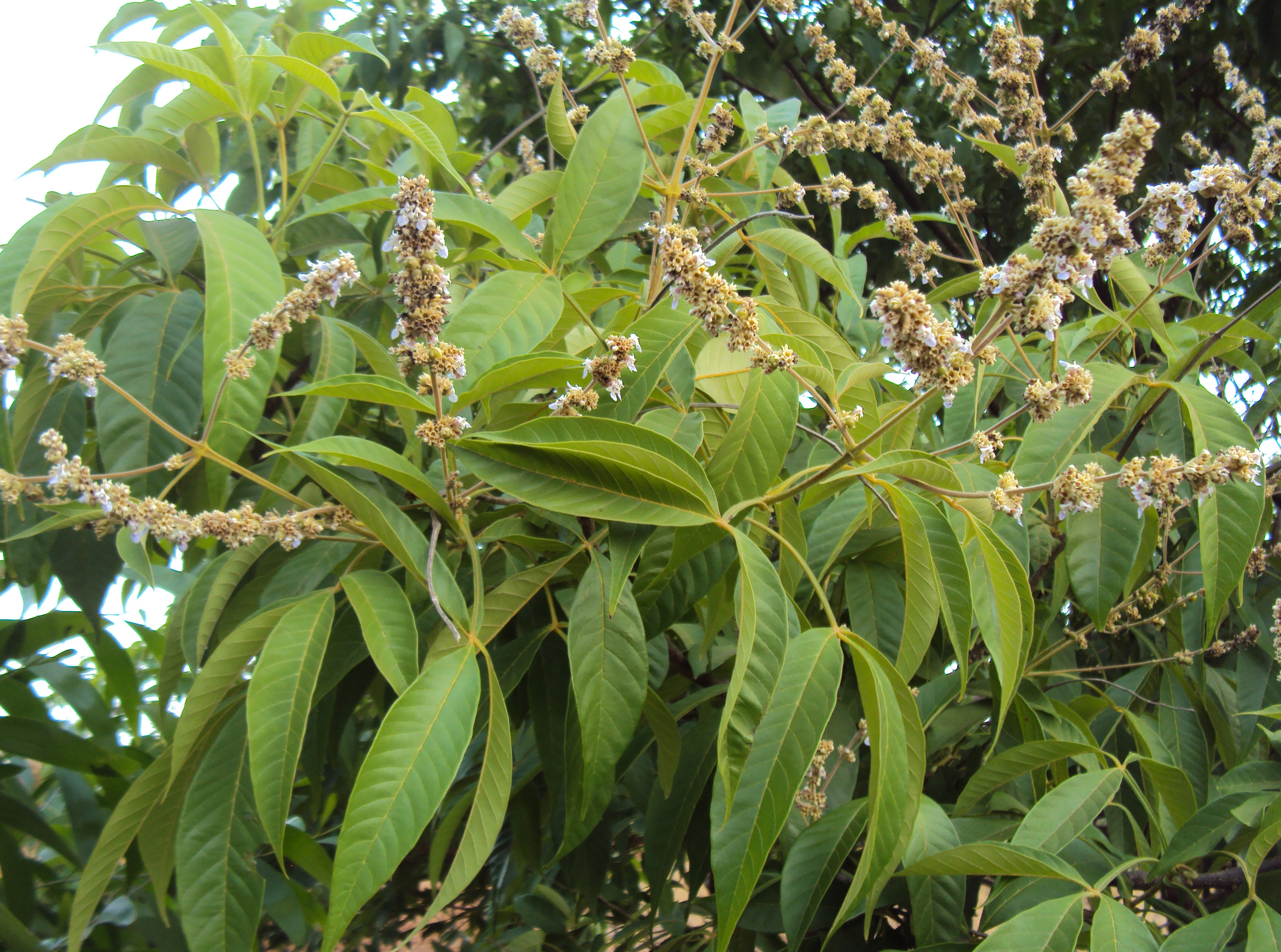
- Inflorescences and trifoliolate leaves
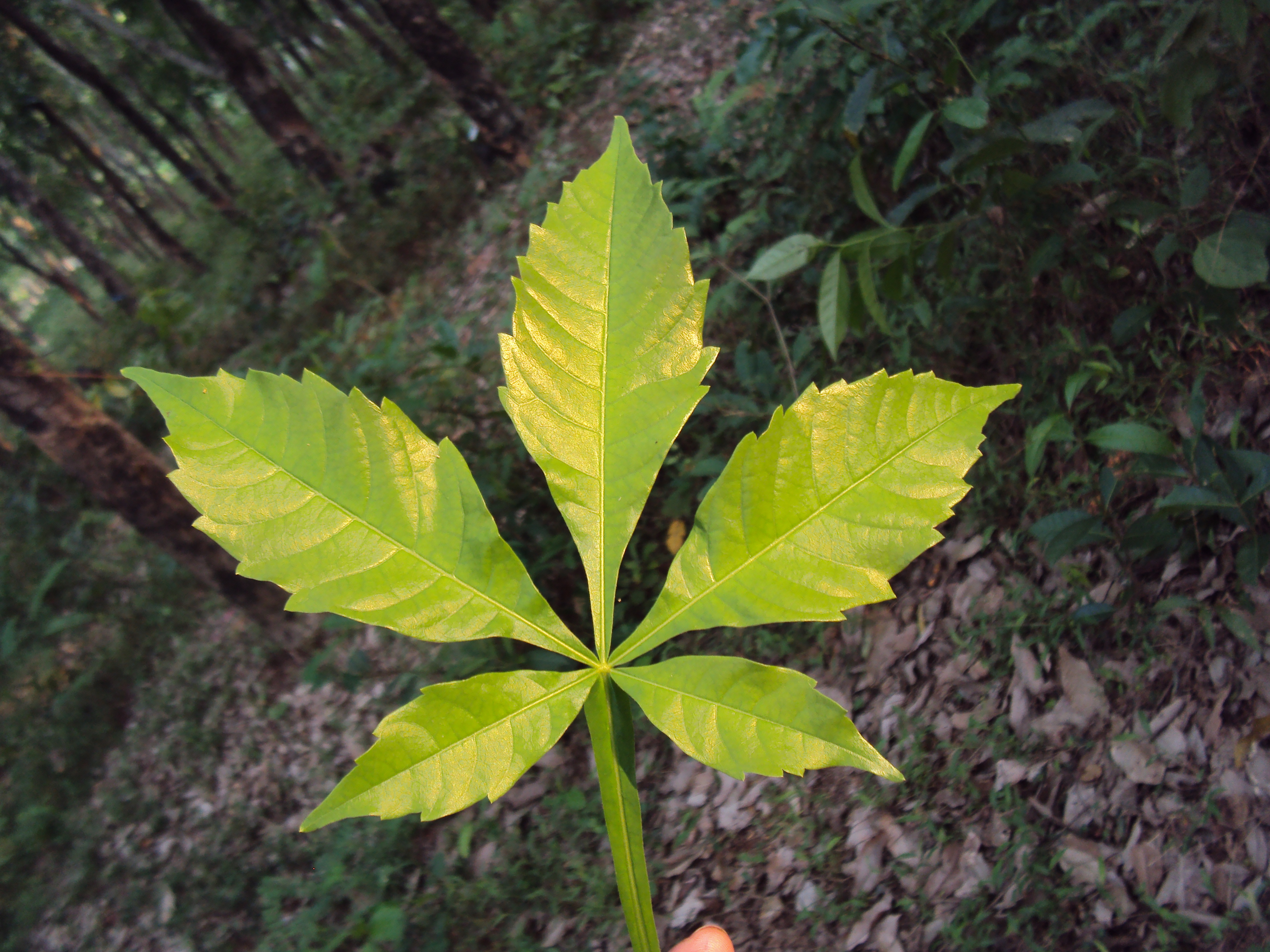
- Upper side of palmate leaf

Scientific classification
- Kingdom: Plantae
- Clade: Tracheophytes
- Clade: Angiosperms
- Clade: Eudicots
- Clade: Asterids
- Order: Lamiales
- Family: Lamiaceae
- Genus: Vitex
- Species: V. altissima

Binomial name
- Vitex altissima L.f.

Synonyms
- Vitex alata Willd.; Vitex altissima f. alata (Willd.) Moldenke; Vitex appendiculata Rottler ex C.B.Clarke; Vitex latifolia Wight ex Steud. [Invalid]; Vitex zeylanica Turcz. [Illegitimate]

= Vitex altissima =

Species of tree

Vitex altissima, the peacock chaste tree, is a species of woody plant reaching some 20 m in height, in the family of Lamiaceae. It is native to the Indomalayan realm, namely Bangladesh, India, Indonesia, Myanmar, and Sri Lanka, and is also found in New Guinea. Its greyish bark becomes scaly with maturity. The leaves are trifoliolate or palmate, compound and opposite. They are elliptic or elliptic-lanceolate in shape with acuminate apex and cuneate base. The margin is serrate or sometimes entire. The inflorescences are in terminal panicles. The corolla is bluish white. The purplish black fruit is a four-seeded drupe.

== Common names ==
- Tamil – Mayilei, Mayilainochi, Mayiladi
- Malayalam – Myila, Mylellu
- Marathi – Dhavi-rivthi, Balage
- Telugu – Ganduparu, Nemiliadogu
- Kannada – Myrole, Nevaladi, Navuladi, Balgay
- Sinhala – Milla (මිල්ල)
- English – Peacock chaste tree, Tall chaste tree
- Assamese – Ahoi (অহোঈ )
- Sanskrit – Atulam (अतुलम्), Tilakam (तिलकम्)
- Nepali – Tin-patte
