= Vitex heptaphylla =

Conservation status
- Data Deficient (IUCN 2.3)

Scientific classification
- Kingdom: Plantae
- Clade: Tracheophytes
- Clade: Angiosperms
- Clade: Eudicots
- Clade: Asterids
- Order: Lamiales
- Family: Lamiaceae
- Genus: Vitex
- Species: V. heptaphylla

Binomial name
- Vitex heptaphylla A. Juss.

Species of flowering plant

Vitex heptaphylla is a species of plant in the family Lamiaceae. It is found in Cuba, Dominica, the Dominican Republic, and Haiti.
