= Red imported fire ants in Australia =

Overview of the role and status of RIFA in Australia

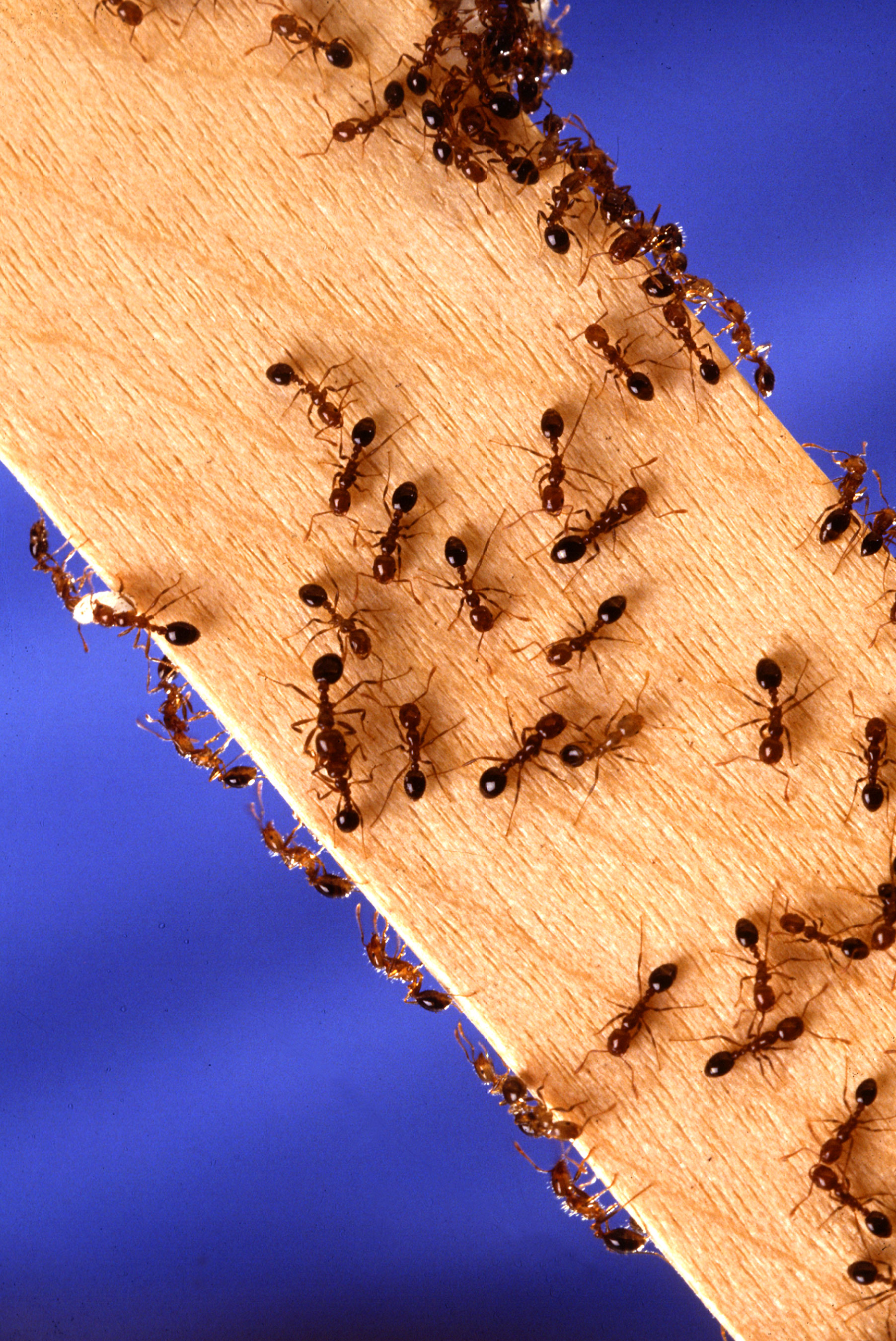
Red imported fire ants

The red imported fire ant (Solenopsis invicta) is an invasive species in Australia originating from South America but imported to Australia, New Zealand, the United States of America and several Asian and Caribbean countries. Fire ants are listed by the International Union for Conservation of Nature (IUCN) as one of the world's most invasive species.

Fire ants were first detected in Australia in Queensland in 2001. The Australian government has listed Fire ants as a Key Threatening Process in recognition of the ant’s potential to severely impact on Australia’s biodiversity.

== Appearance ==
Fire ants have a copper brown head and body with a darker abdomen. The worker ants are blackish to reddish and vary in size from 2–6 mm.

== Distribution ==
There have been seven separate incursions of fire ants in Australia - six in Queensland and one in New South Wales (NSW). In Queensland, the first two incursions were discovered in 2001 - one in suburban Brisbane and the other at the Port of Brisbane. The pathway of entry is unknown but the ant was probably accidentally introduced in a shipping container from the southern United States, where the ant is well established.

The third and fourth incursions were in Yarwun, Central Queensland in 2006 and 2013. The fifth incursion to Queensland was found at Brisbane Airport in 2015, and the sixth at Port of Brisbane in 2016. The NSW incursion was discovered in 2014 in Port Botany.

According to the Queensland Department of Agriculture and Fisheries, the Port of Brisbane, Yarwun and Port Botany incursions have been eradicated. However, the initial Brisbane infestation has spread to around 300,000 hectares of south-east Queensland, and experts warn that the ant could soon spread to adjacent areas of NSW. Nevertheless, according to an Independent Review of the National Red Imported Fire Ant Eradication Program, it is still considered technically feasible to eradicate red fire ants from south-east Queensland.

== Impacts ==
Red imported fire ants are a serious problem because they are an invasive species and can cause major environmental, social and economic damage.

=== Environmental ===
Fire ants have the potential to invade most of the coastal areas of Australia, and large areas of Australia’s tropical north, including world heritage areas and national parks.

Fire ants are very aggressive and feed voraciously on ground dwelling animals, such as insects, frogs, reptiles, birds and mammals. As a result, they could displace or eliminate some of Australia’s native animals, including endangered birds such as the southern cassowary and Gouldian finch, and threatened turtles such as the hawksbill turtle and the green turtle. Fire ants are also a threat to native plants because they eat and damage seeds and seedlings, as well as some of the insects and animals that pollinate native plants. These impacts can cause major disruptions to ecosystems over time.

=== Social ===
Fire ants are a serious threat to human health because of their sting which causes a painful, burning sensation. They swarm to attack and sting repeatedly. Stings may be lethal if a severe allergic reaction (anaphylaxis) occurs and experts predict that fire ants could be responsible for up to 3,000 anaphylactic reactions in Australia each year if they spread. There is also a risk of secondary infection if the blisters or pustules that result from the stings are broken. Fire ants could also seriously disrupt Australia’s outdoor lifestyle, as has been the case in the United States where fire ants have been responsible for 85 deaths. Everyday activities, such as barbecues, picnics and sporting events may no longer be possible in highly infested areas. Pets and domestic animals can also be stung and injured, and may have allergic reactions or be blinded by exposure to venom.

=== Economic ===
Red imported fire ants are estimated to be the costliest invasive insect in Australia and the third costliest invasive species.

Modelling by the Queensland government shows that fire ants have the potential to cost the state an estimated $45 billion Australian dollars in south-east Queensland alone. Costs include impacts on agriculture, machinery and infrastructure. According to the Queensland Department of Agriculture and Fisheries, fire ants kill farm animals and crops, with newborn animals being particularly vulnerable. Fire ants sting in and around the eyes, mouth and nose which can cause blindness, swelling and suffocation. Fire ants also invade the food and water supplies of animals and deter them from feeding and drinking, leading to starvation and dehydration. Fire ants also damage crops by eating seeds and tunnelling through roots and stems. They protect some species of pest insects that produce honeydew. The increased presence of these pests may affect the quality of produce and assist the spread of disease.

In the United States, fire ant mounds have destroyed equipment such as irrigation systems and damaged machinery during harvesting operations. The mounds have also been a problem in lawns, sporting fields and golf courses. The ants have also damaged roads, footpaths and expensive electrical equipment, often seriously. Control costs are also significant, and it is estimated that up to June 2016 federal, state and territory governments have already spent more than $329 million in total attempting to eradicate the ants. In the US, fire ants have cost the economy an estimated US$7 billion.

== Biosecurity ==
The Australian Government responded rapidly to the detection of fire ants in Brisbane in 2001, with the injection of significant initial funds. However, by 2016, incursions showed that the fire ant was continuing to breach Australia’s borders, despite a reportedly strong quarantine focus. Significant lags between arrival and detection have been noted. For example, it is probable that the 2014 incursion was not detected for two to three years after arrival.

Experts argue that funding for effective national surveillance and eradication programs are required while a brief window of opportunity to efficiently eradicate the fire ant still exists. A 2016 report concluded that every dollar spent on eradication now would save $25 in the longer term.

As of February 2024, six incursions of the ants had been discovered and eradicated very quickly. By the time, they had spread across Brisbane and southwards into the Gold Coast, as well as having been found in northern New South Wales at Murwillumbah and Wardell. Commonwealth and state governments have committed around a billion dollars in an effort to eradicate the pest from Queensland by 2032.
