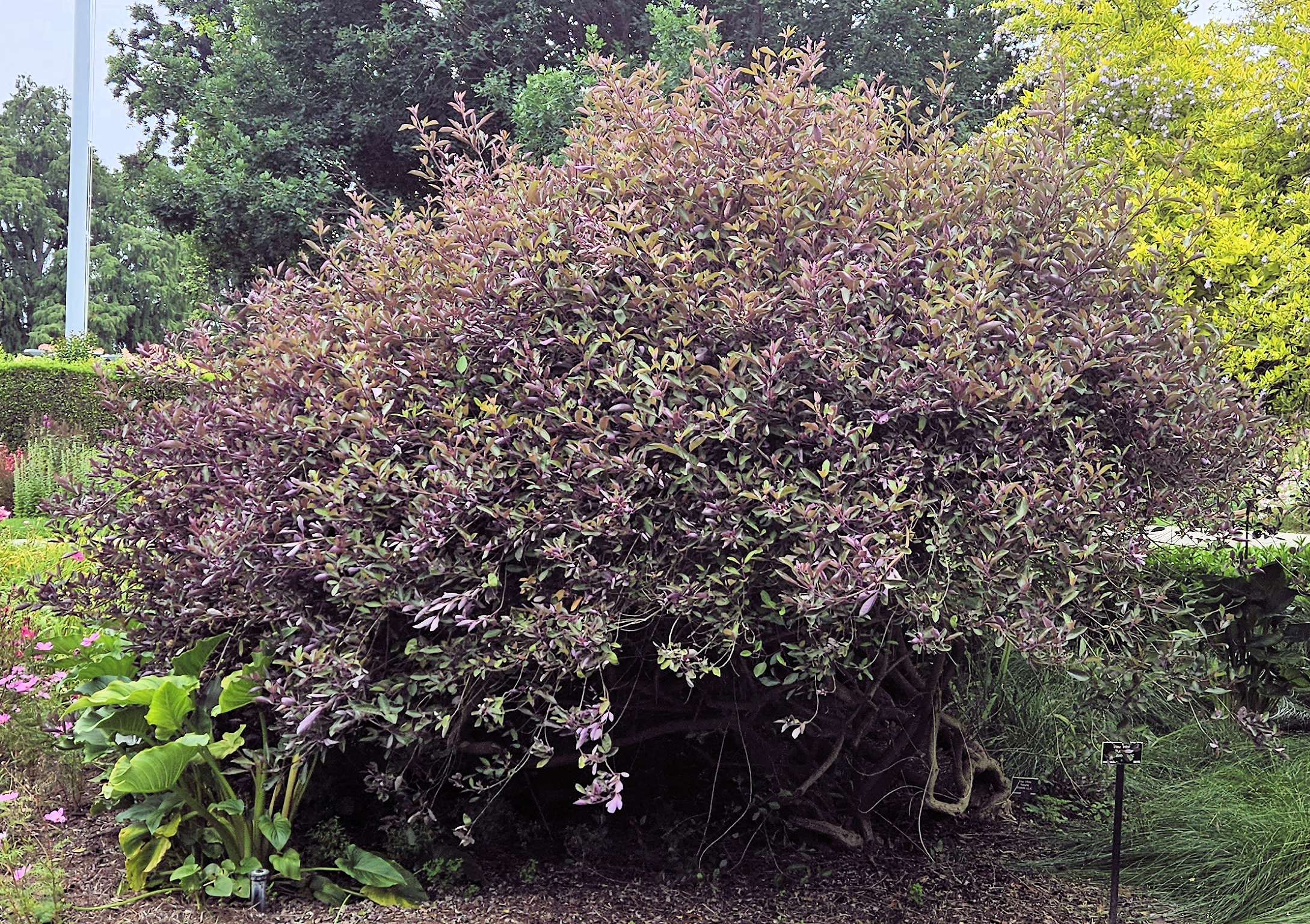
- Vitex trifolia 'Pupurea' cultivar at the Huntington Botanical Garden

Scientific classification
- Kingdom: Plantae
- Clade: Embryophytes
- Clade: Tracheophytes
- Clade: Angiosperms
- Clade: Eudicots
- Clade: Asterids
- Order: Lamiales
- Family: Lamiaceae
- Genus: Vitex
- Species: V. triflora

Binomial name
- Vitex triflora Vahl

Synonyms
- Casarettoa diversifolia Walp.; Macrostegia ruiziana Nees; Pyrostoma ternatum G.Mey.; Vitex triflora var. angustiloba Huber; Vitex triflora var. coriacea Huber; Vitex triflora var. floribunda Huber; Vitex triflora var. hirsuta Moldenke; Vitex triflora var. kraatzii Huber; Vitex triflora var. ovata Makino; Vitex triflora var. quinquefoliolata Moldenke; Vitex triflora f. quinquefoliolata (Moldenke) Moldenke; Vitex triflora var. tenuifolia Huber; Vitex triflora var. unifoliolata Schauer

= Vitex triflora =

Species of tree

Vitex triflora is a species of tree in the family Lamiaceae. It is native to Panama and South America.
