= Vitex orinocensis =

Scientific classification
- Kingdom: Plantae
- Clade: Tracheophytes
- Clade: Angiosperms
- Clade: Eudicots
- Clade: Asterids
- Order: Lamiales
- Family: Lamiaceae
- Genus: Vitex
- Species: V. orinocensis

Binomial name
- Vitex orinocensis Kunth

Synonyms
- Vitex orinocensis var. amazonica Huber; Vitex orinocensis var. glabra Moldenke

Species of tree

Vitex orinocensis is a species of tree in the family Lamiaceae. It is native to South America.
