= Vitex acunae =

Conservation status
- Vulnerable (IUCN 2.3)

Scientific classification
- Kingdom: Plantae
- Clade: Tracheophytes
- Clade: Angiosperms
- Clade: Eudicots
- Clade: Asterids
- Order: Lamiales
- Family: Lamiaceae
- Genus: Vitex
- Species: V. acunae

Binomial name
- Vitex acunae Borh. & Muniz

Species of flowering plant

Vitex acunae is a species of plant in the family Lamiaceae. It is endemic to Cuba. It is threatened by habitat loss.
