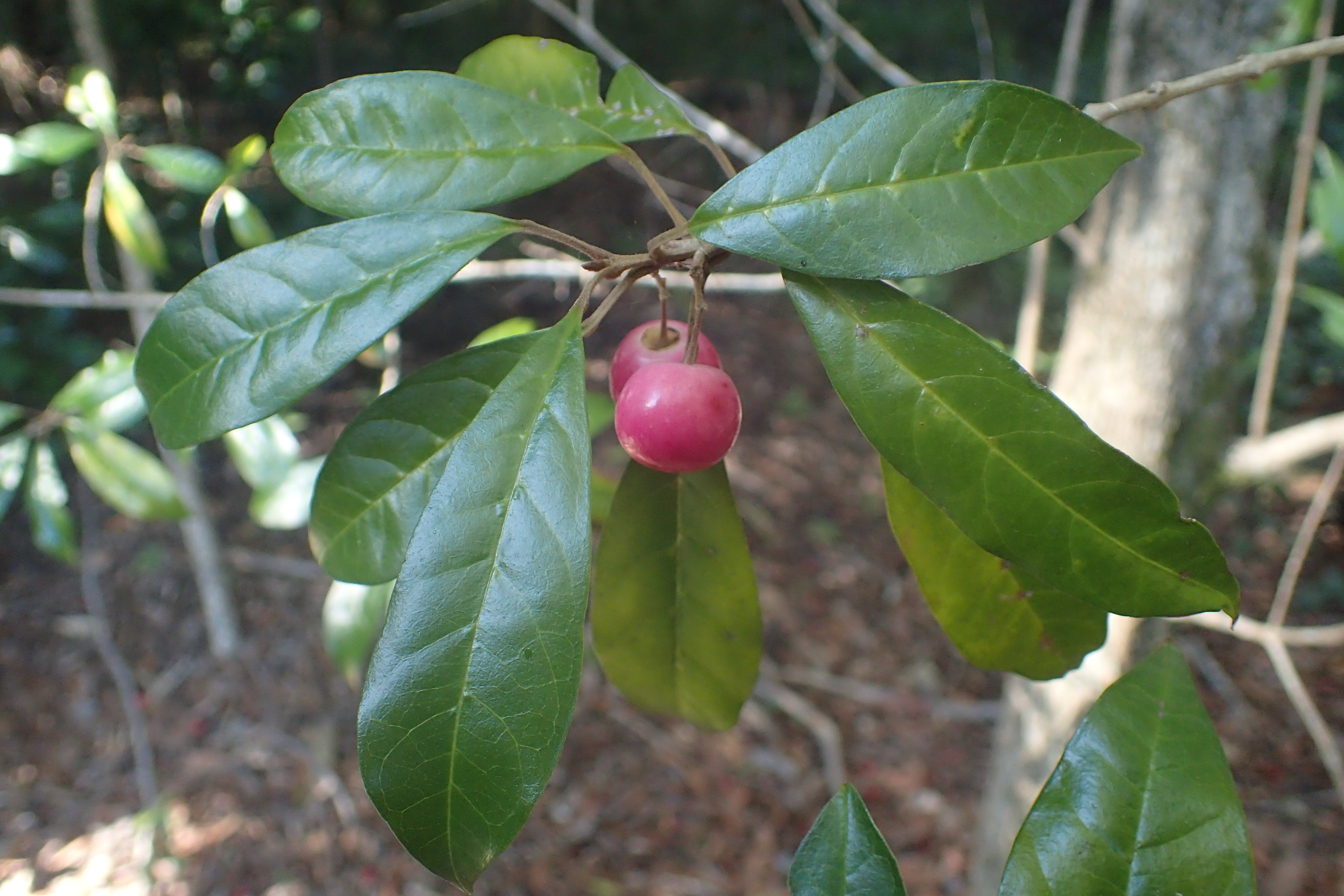
- Vitex lignum-vitae in Coffs Harbour Botanic Garden

Scientific classification
- Kingdom: Plantae
- Clade: Tracheophytes
- Clade: Angiosperms
- Clade: Eudicots
- Clade: Asterids
- Order: Lamiales
- Family: Lamiaceae
- Genus: Vitex
- Species: V. lignum-vitae

Binomial name
- Vitex lignum-vitae (A.Cunn. ex Schauer) Piep.

Synonyms
- Premna lignum-vitae A.Cunn. ex Schauer

= Vitex lignum-vitae =

Species of tree

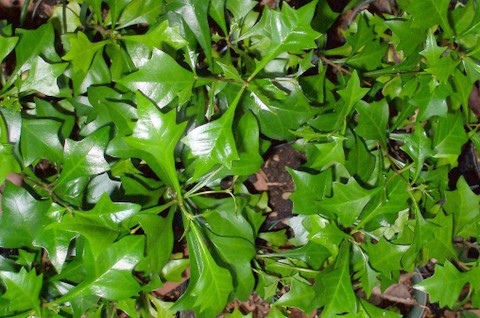
Lobed juvenile leaves

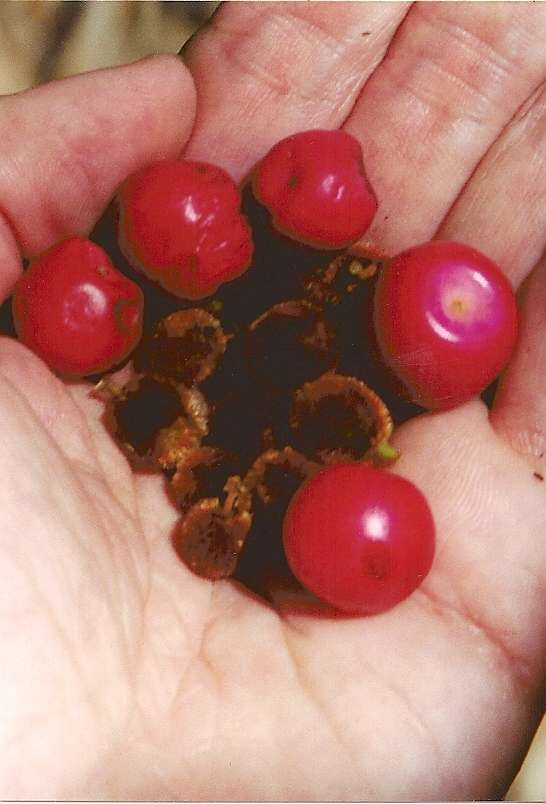
Vitex lignum-vitae (red fruit) and Jagera pseudorhus (brown fruit) growing beside the Tweed River, Australia

Vitex lignum-vitae, known in Australia as yellow hollywood or "lignum-vitae" (also used for other species), is a rainforest tree of eastern Australia. The natural range of distribution is in dry, sub-tropical or tropical rainforest from the Richmond River, New South Wales to Cape York Peninsula at the northernmost tip of Australia. It also occurs in New Guinea. Lignum vitae is Latin for "wood of life".

== Description ==
Vitex lignum-vitae is a small to medium tree growing to a height of 30 metres (98.4 ft) and a trunk diameter of 90 cm (2.95 ft). The trunk is creamy or brown, with horizontal lines and fissures. Its bark sheds in small flakes. Flanged or buttressed at the base of larger trees, the bole is irregular in shape.

Juvenile and coppice leaves are lobed or angled. Mature leaves opposite, simple, shiny and not toothed. The leaves are 5 to 13 cm long, and often broader towards the tip. The leaf stalks are 15 to 25 mm long, hairy and channeled on the upper side. Net veins are visible on the leaf's underside. Small foveolae (raised hairy bumps) appear at the junction of the midrib and larger lateral veins. Branchlets grey and hairy, somewhat four angled in cross section.

Pale purple flowers form on cymes at various times of the year, most often around the month of April. The fruit is a red drupe, 8 to 12 mm in diameter with a round hard capsule inside. The capsule has four cells, each containing a fertile or infertile seed. The fruit ripens in the months of November to April, and is eaten by birds including the green catbird and rose crowned fruit dove.

Regeneration from seed is remarkably slow and difficult. The fleshy aril should be removed from the fruit capsule. Old fruit is preferred. Roots and shoots may appear after two or more years.
