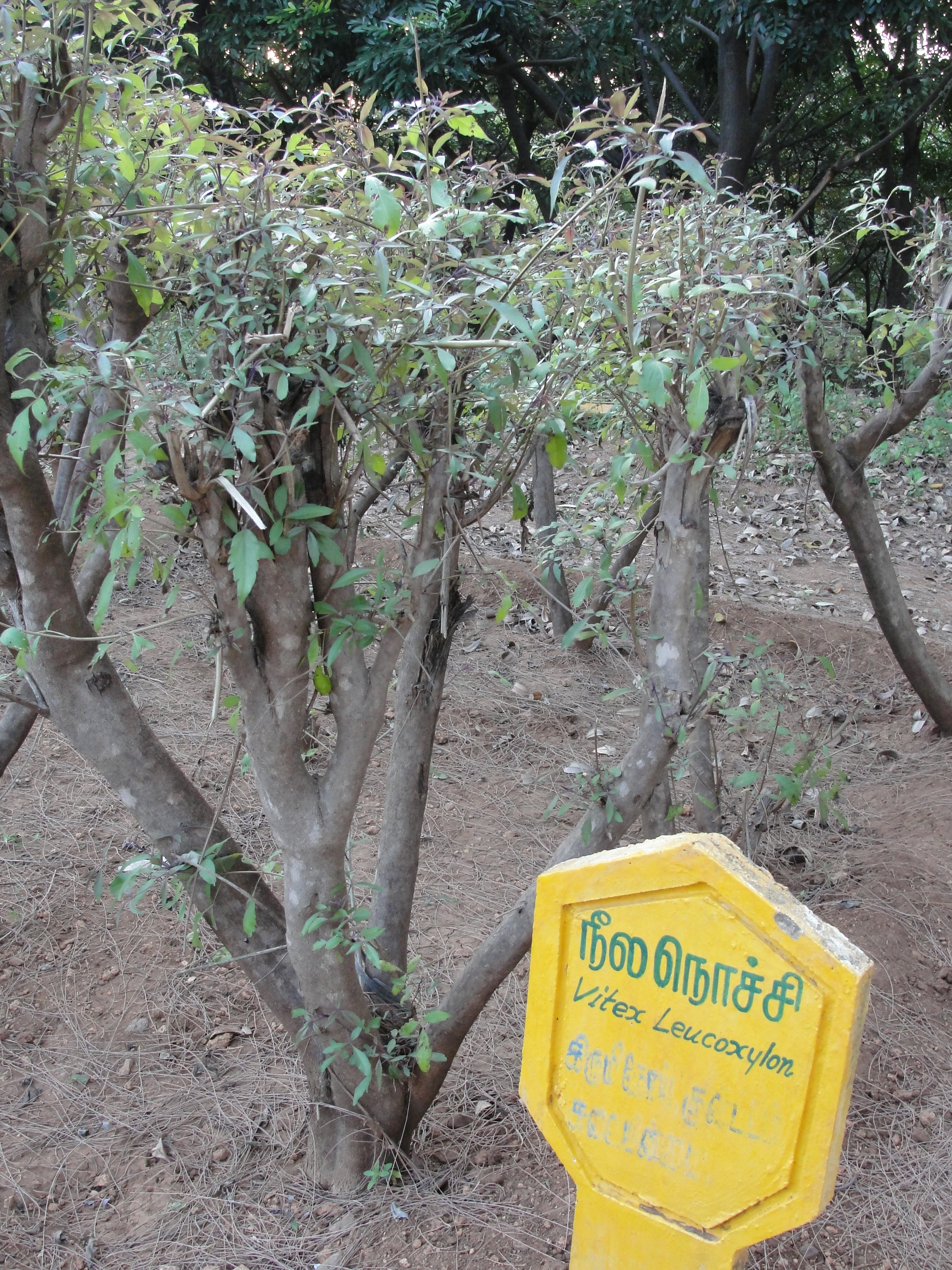

Scientific classification
- Kingdom: Plantae
- Clade: Tracheophytes
- Clade: Angiosperms
- Clade: Eudicots
- Clade: Asterids
- Order: Lamiales
- Family: Lamiaceae
- Genus: Vitex
- Species: V. leucoxylon

Binomial name
- Vitex leucoxylon L.f.

Synonyms
- Vitex alata Willd.; Vitex altissima f. alata (Willd.) Moldenke; Vitex appendiculata Rottler ex C.B.Clarke; Vitex latifolia Wight ex Steud. [Invalid]; Vitex zeylanica Turcz. [Illegitimate]

= Vitex leucoxylon =

White wood chaste tree

Species of tree

Vitex leucoxylon, the white wood chaste tree, is a species of deciduous woody plant with 15m height, in the family Lamiaceae. Native to Western Ghats of India and Sri Lanka. Bark is brown in color. Leaves compound, digitate; apex acute to obtuse; base cuneate - attenuate; margin entire. Inflorescence is corymbose cymes. Corolla is white with purple color. Fruit is purplish black with four seeded smooth drupe.

== Common names ==
- Sinhala - නැබඩ
- Tamil - Nir nocchi, Nir-noochi
- Malayalam - Beemis, Vellanotchi, Attunochi, Neernochi, Atta nochii
- Marathi - Sona garbi, Sheras
- Telugu - Gajavaavili, Kondavaavili, Lakkiya, Lakke
- Kannada - Holenekki, Sengeni, Hollalakki
- Sanskrit - Paravatapadi
