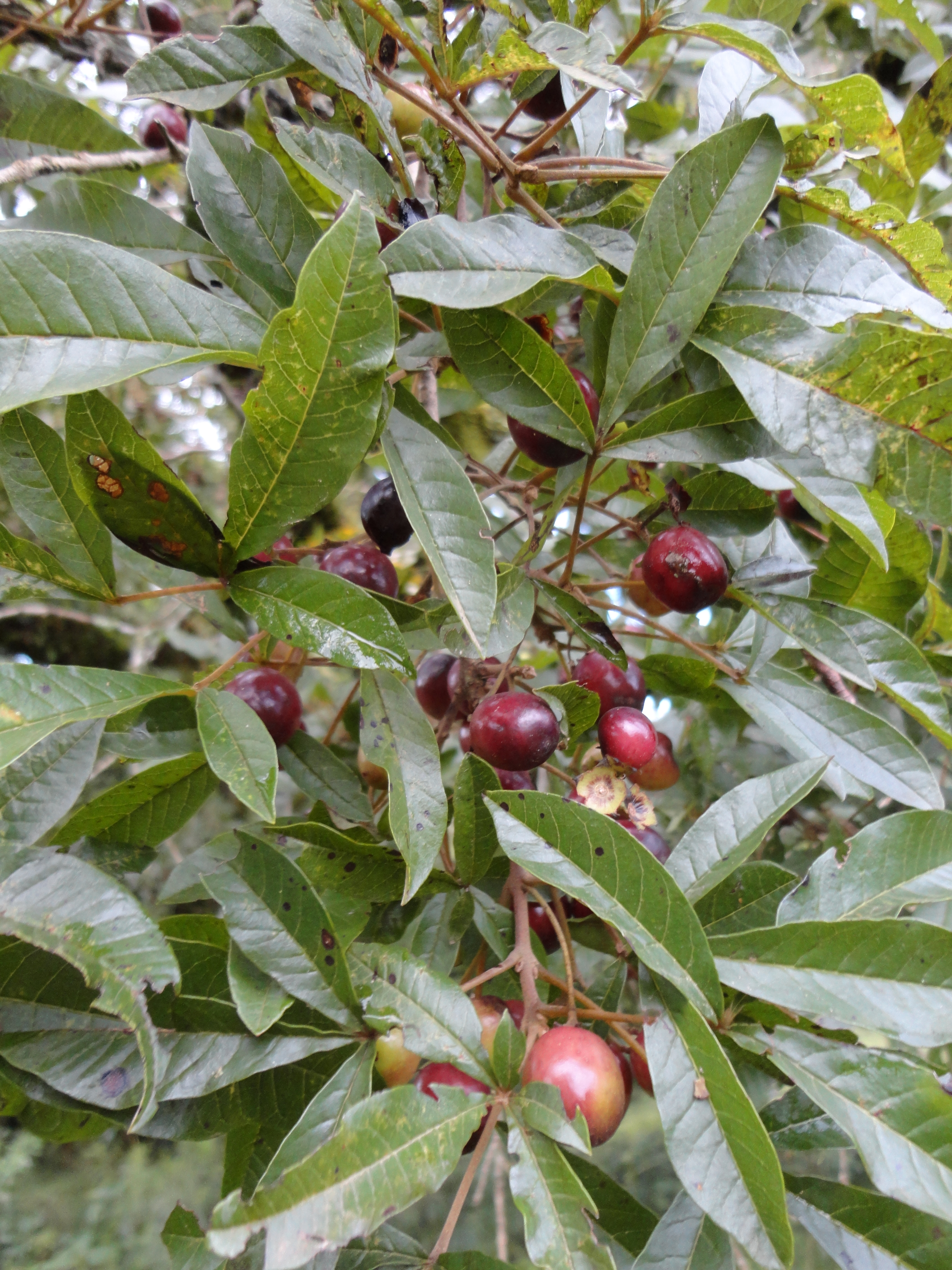
- Close-up of stems, leaves, and ripened fruit

Scientific classification
- Kingdom: Plantae
- Clade: Tracheophytes
- Clade: Angiosperms
- Clade: Eudicots
- Clade: Asterids
- Order: Lamiales
- Family: Lamiaceae
- Genus: Vitex
- Species: V. megapotamica

Binomial name
- Vitex megapotamica Cham.

Synonyms
- Bignonia megapotamica Spreng.; Psilogyne viticifolia DC.; Vitex montevidensis Cham.; Vitex multinervis (Cham.) Schauer; Vitex taruma Mart.; Vitex viticifolia (DC.) B.L.Rob.

= Vitex megapotamica =

Species of tree

Vitex megapotamica is a hardwood fruit tree found in Argentina, Paraguay, Uruguay, and southern Brazil. In Brazil it is commonly called tarumã.

The tarumã grows to be up to ten metres tall. Its bark is coloured dark grey; its compound leaves have a long petiole and five elliptic leaflets. The small, abundant flowers developed into fleshy stone fruit. The fruits are eaten by a number of species, and serve also as fishing bait.

Tarumã grows from the Southeast Region of Brazil to the South Region, and on through Uruguay and Paraguay to Argentina.

In Brazil, its common names include azeitona do mato (forest olive), azeitona brava, cinco folhas (five leaves), copiúba, sombra de touro (bull's shadow), and tarumã romã (tarumã pomegranate).
