= Vitex glabrata =

Scientific classification
- Kingdom: Plantae
- Clade: Embryophytes
- Clade: Tracheophytes
- Clade: Angiosperms
- Clade: Eudicots
- Clade: Asterids
- Order: Lamiales
- Family: Lamiaceae
- Genus: Vitex
- Species: V. glabrata

Binomial name
- Vitex glabrata R.Br.

Species of flowering plant

Vitex glabrata, commonly known as smooth chastetree, bush currant, black plum, black fruit, and black grape, is a species medium-sized deciduous tree in the family Lamiaceae. It is native to Australia (Northern Territory, Western Australia, and Queensland), Bangladesh, Brunei, Cambodia, India (including both the mainland and the Andaman and Nicobar Islands), Indonesia (most regions of Indonesia except Sumatra), Laos, Malaysia, Marianas, Myanmar, New Caledonia, Papua New Guinea (including Bismarck Archipelago), Philippines, Solomon Islands, Thailand, and Vietnam.

== Characteristics ==
The fruit is black in color and edible when ripe with a sweet taste, and is eaten raw, cooked, or dry. It has shown significant anti-inflammatory properties in rats in studies.

Some sources claim that the bark and roots are used as a traditional medicine.
