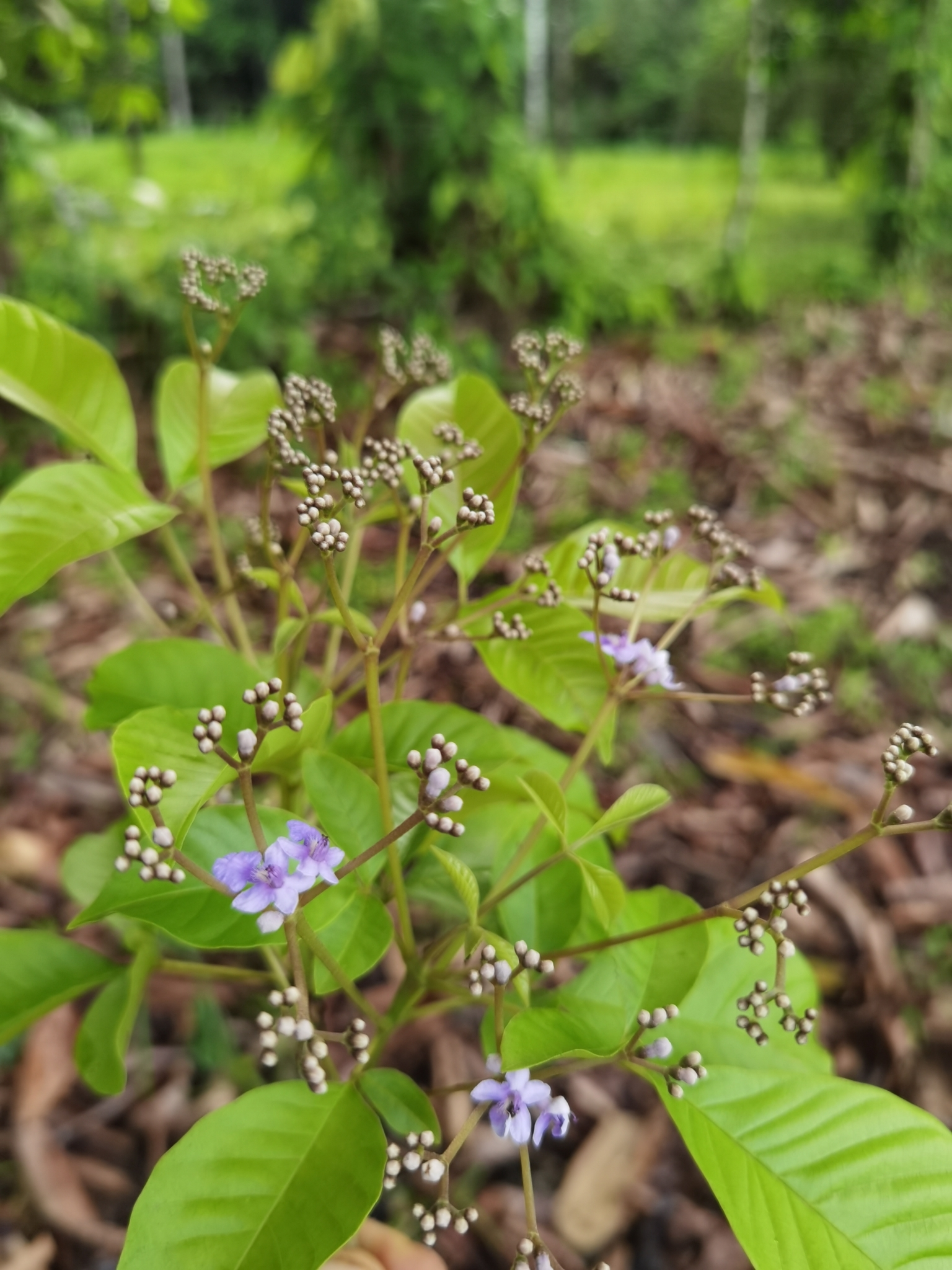

Conservation status
- Least Concern (IUCN 2.3)

Scientific classification
- Kingdom: Plantae
- Clade: Tracheophytes
- Clade: Angiosperms
- Clade: Eudicots
- Clade: Asterids
- Order: Lamiales
- Family: Lamiaceae
- Genus: Vitex
- Species: V. cooperi

Binomial name
- Vitex cooperi Standl.

= Vitex cooperi =

Species of flowering plant

Vitex cooperi is a species of plant in the family Lamiaceae. It is found in Costa Rica, Guatemala, Honduras, Nicaragua, and Panama.
