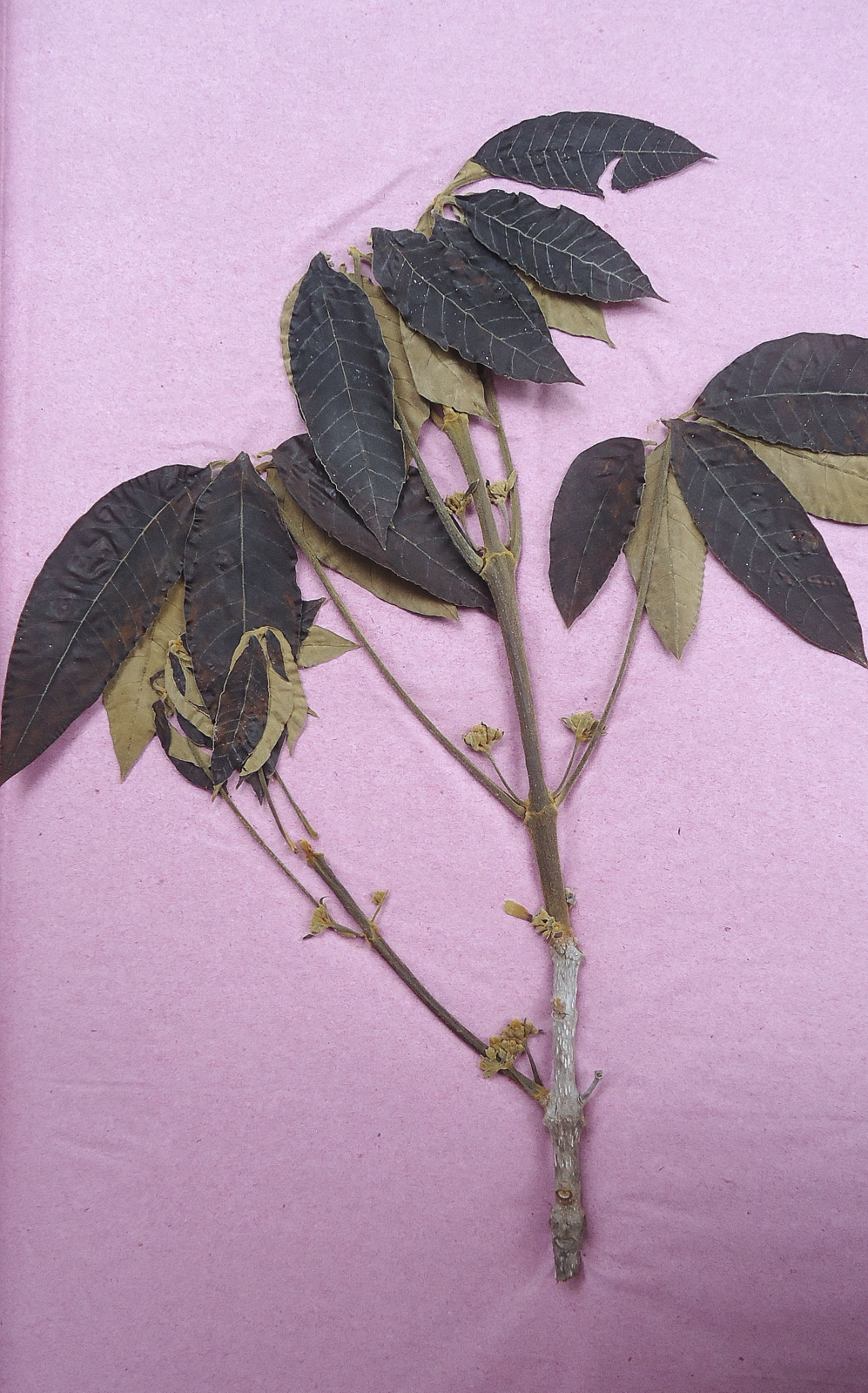

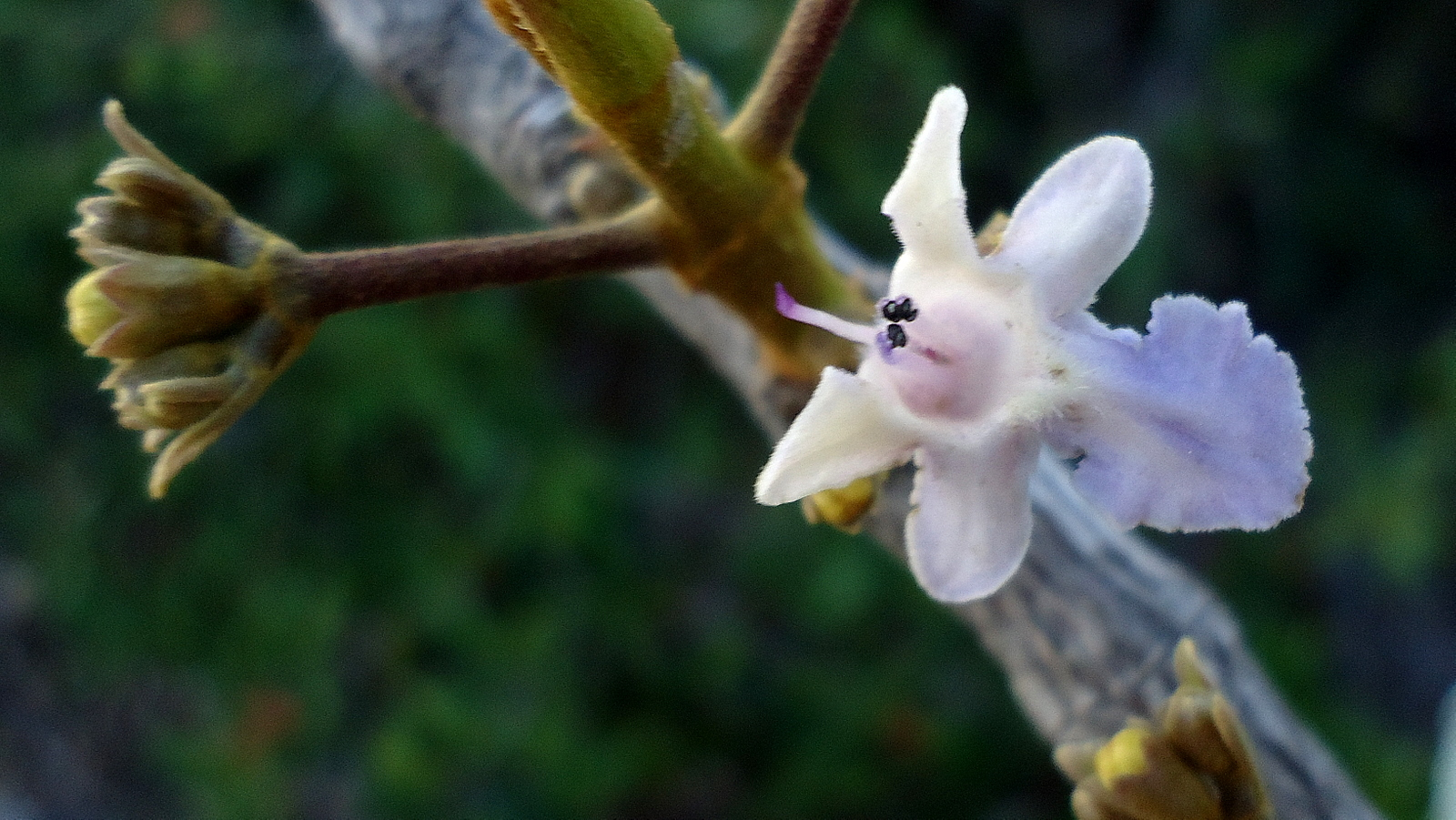

Scientific classification
- Kingdom: Plantae
- Clade: Tracheophytes
- Clade: Angiosperms
- Clade: Eudicots
- Clade: Asterids
- Order: Lamiales
- Family: Lamiaceae
- Genus: Vitex
- Species: V. cymosa

Binomial name
- Vitex cymosa Bertero ex Spreng.

Synonyms
- Jatropha tomentosa Spreng.; Vitex cujabensis Mart. ex Benth.; Vitex cymosa f. albiflora Moldenke; Vitex discolor Glaz.

= Vitex cymosa =

Species of tree

Vitex cymosa is a species of tree in the family Lamiaceae. It is native to Panama and South America.
