= Vitex madiensis =

Conservation status
- Least Concern (IUCN 3.1)

Scientific classification
- Kingdom: Plantae
- Clade: Embryophytes
- Clade: Tracheophytes
- Clade: Angiosperms
- Clade: Eudicots
- Clade: Asterids
- Order: Lamiales
- Family: Lamiaceae
- Genus: Vitex
- Species: V. madiensis

Binomial name
- Vitex madiensis Oliv., 1875

Species of plant

Vitex madiensis is a species of shrub or small tree in the family of Lamiaceae native to dry tropical Africa. It bears edible fruit and its fruit, stem bark, leaves, and roots were traditionally used in African folk medicine.
