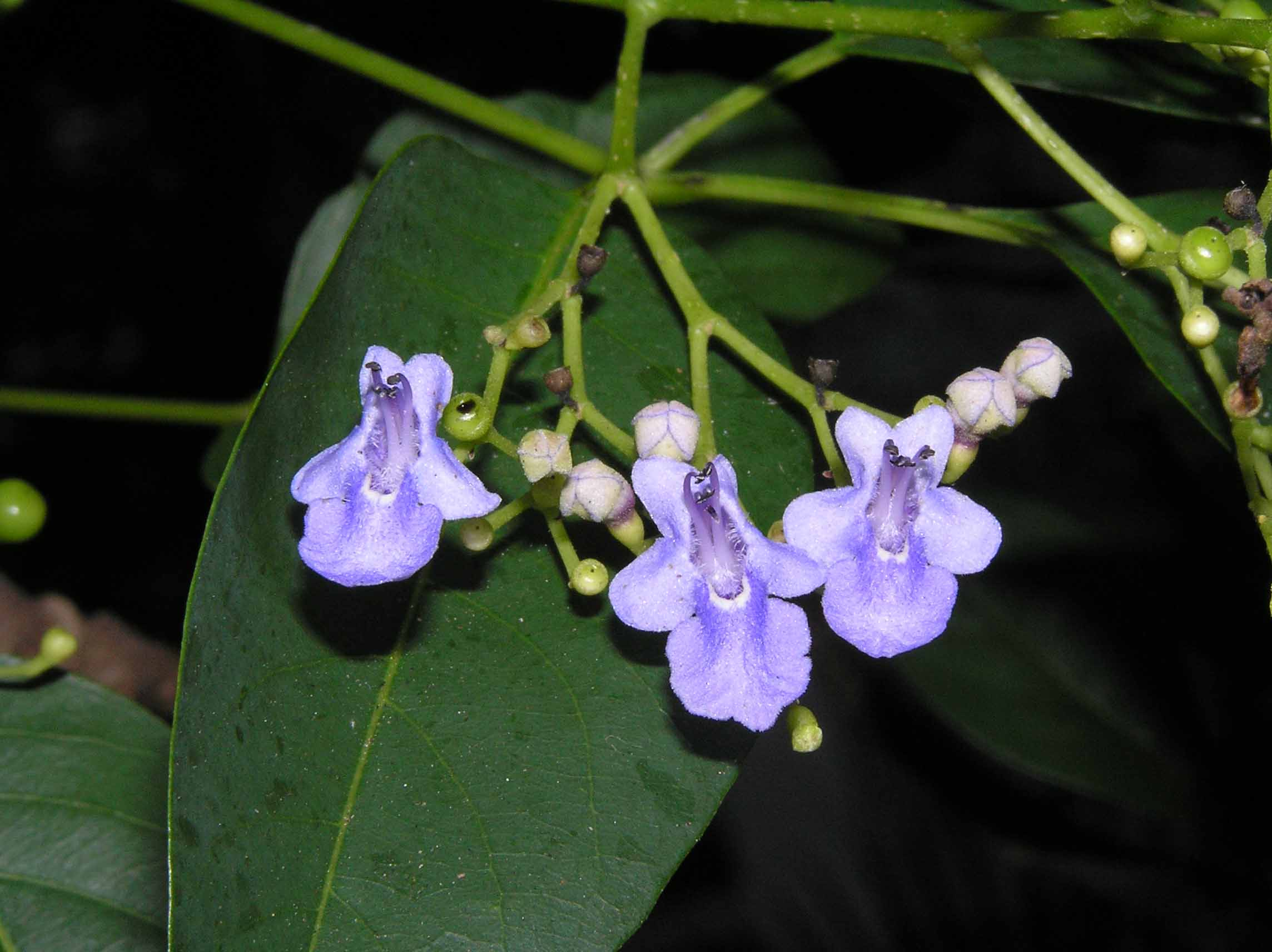

Conservation status
- Least Concern (IUCN 3.1)

Scientific classification
- Kingdom: Plantae
- Clade: Tracheophytes
- Clade: Angiosperms
- Clade: Eudicots
- Clade: Asterids
- Order: Lamiales
- Family: Lamiaceae
- Genus: Vitex
- Species: V. tripinnata

Binomial name
- Vitex tripinnata (Lour.) Merr., 1935

Synonyms
- Tripinna tripinnata Lour.; Tripinnaria asiatica Spreng.; Tripinnaria cochinchinensis Pers.; Tripinnaria tripinnata (Lour.) Steud.; Vitex annamensis Dop; Vitex leptobotrys Hallier f.

= Vitex tripinnata =

Species of tree

Vitex tripinnata is a species of tropical forest tree in the family Lamiaceae. Its recorded distribution is: Cambodia, Hainan island, Laos, Thailand and Vietnam: where it may be called Mắt cáo or Bình linh Evard.
