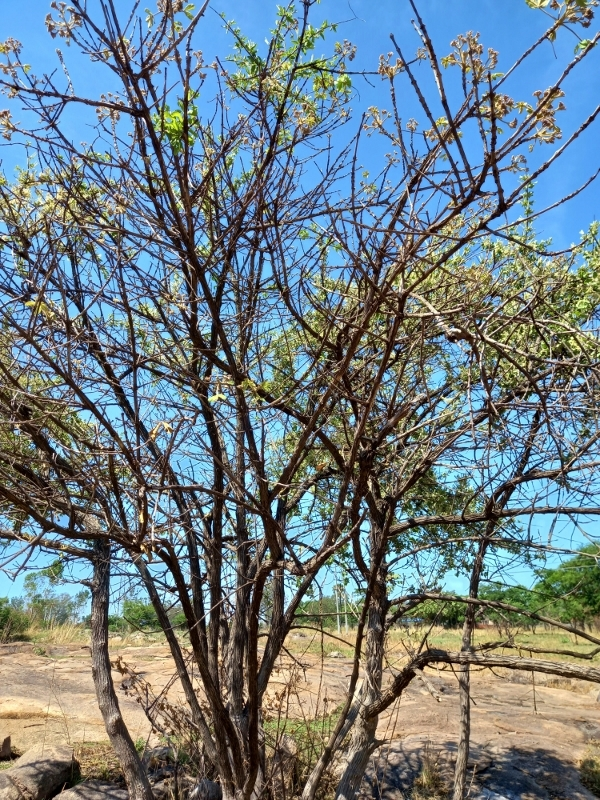

Conservation status
- Least Concern (IUCN 3.1)

Scientific classification
- Kingdom: Plantae
- Clade: Tracheophytes
- Clade: Angiosperms
- Clade: Eudicots
- Clade: Asterids
- Order: Lamiales
- Family: Lamiaceae
- Genus: Vitex
- Species: V. payos

Binomial name
- Vitex payos (Lour.) Merr.

Synonyms
- Allasia payos Lour.; Vitex allasia Planch.; Vitex hildebrandtii Vatke; Vitex iringensis Gürke; Vitex shirensis Baker; Vitex zambesiaca Baker; Vitex isotjensis Gibbs; Vitex eylesii S.Moore; Vitex villosa Sim; Vitex hildebrandtii var. glabrescens W.Piep.; Vitex hildebrandtii var. zambesiaca (Baker) W.Piep.; Vitex payos var. glabrescens (W.Piep.) Moldenke; Vitex payos var. stipitata Moldenke

= Vitex payos =

Species of plant

Vitex payos is a species of shrub or tree in the family of Lamiaceae which has a native range in southern Africa stretching from Angola to Kenya. It bears fruits with edible pulp which have a taste often compared to chocolate.

In English it is commonly known as the black plum or chocolate berry. Common names in other languages and dialects include:

- Chonyi and Digo: mfudu or mfudu onga
- Embu and Mbeere: mburu or muburu
- Gogo, Hehe, and Nyamwezi: mfulu or mfulu-genge
- Kamba: kimuu or muu
- Luguru: mfuru
- Meru: muuru
- Swahili: mfudu or mfufu
- Zigua: mgobe
