= Vitex amaniensis =

Conservation status
- Vulnerable (IUCN 2.3)

Scientific classification
- Kingdom: Plantae
- Clade: Tracheophytes
- Clade: Angiosperms
- Clade: Eudicots
- Clade: Asterids
- Order: Lamiales
- Family: Lamiaceae
- Genus: Vitex
- Species: V. amaniensis

Binomial name
- Vitex amaniensis W.Piep.

Species of flowering plant

Vitex amaniensis is a species of plant in the family Lamiaceae. It is endemic to Tanzania.
