= Canberra Indian Myna Action Group =

Australian voluntary public action group

The Canberra Indian Myna Action Group (CIMAG) is a voluntary public action group started in Canberra in 2006 to combat the invasive Indian myna that since its introduction to Canberra in 1968 had become the third most prevalent bird species, competing with and crowding out native birds. In November 2013 the action group won the 2014 Keep Australia Beautiful Award for 'Environmental Innovation and Protection'. As of July 2014, the action group has captured and humanely disposed an estimated 49,000 Indian mynas. The prevalence of the Indian myna in Canberra has been reduced to the sixteenth most prevalent species, with anecdotal evidence of increased observations and nesting by native bird species. The action group has been associated with scientific research in Canberra into the effect of Indian mynas on native bird species and whether controlling Indian myna populations affects the prevalence of native bird species.
