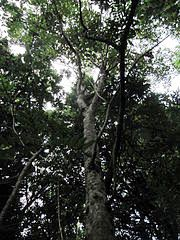

Conservation status
- Least Concern (IUCN 3.1)

Scientific classification
- Kingdom: Plantae
- Clade: Tracheophytes
- Clade: Angiosperms
- Clade: Eudicots
- Clade: Asterids
- Order: Lamiales
- Family: Lamiaceae
- Genus: Vitex
- Species: V. gaumeri

Binomial name
- Vitex gaumeri Greenm.

= Vitex gaumeri =

Species of flowering plant

Vitex gaumeri (also called fiddlewood, walking lady, or yax-nik) is a species of plant in the family Lamiaceae. It is found in Belize, Guatemala, Honduras, and Mexico.
