= Vitex divaricata =

Scientific classification
- Kingdom: Plantae
- Clade: Tracheophytes
- Clade: Angiosperms
- Clade: Eudicots
- Clade: Asterids
- Order: Lamiales
- Family: Lamiaceae
- Genus: Vitex
- Species: V. divaricata

Binomial name
- Vitex divaricata Sw.

Synonyms
- Vitex divaricata var. cubensis Urb. Vitex divaricata var. haitiensis Urb.

Species of plant

Vitex divaricata is a tree shrub of the Caribbean native to Puerto Rico and the US Virgin Islands. Its Spanish vernacular names include higüerillo and higuerillo. Its English vernacular name is white fiddlewood. It belongs to the order Lamiales. This tree is common in the Toro Negro State Forest.
