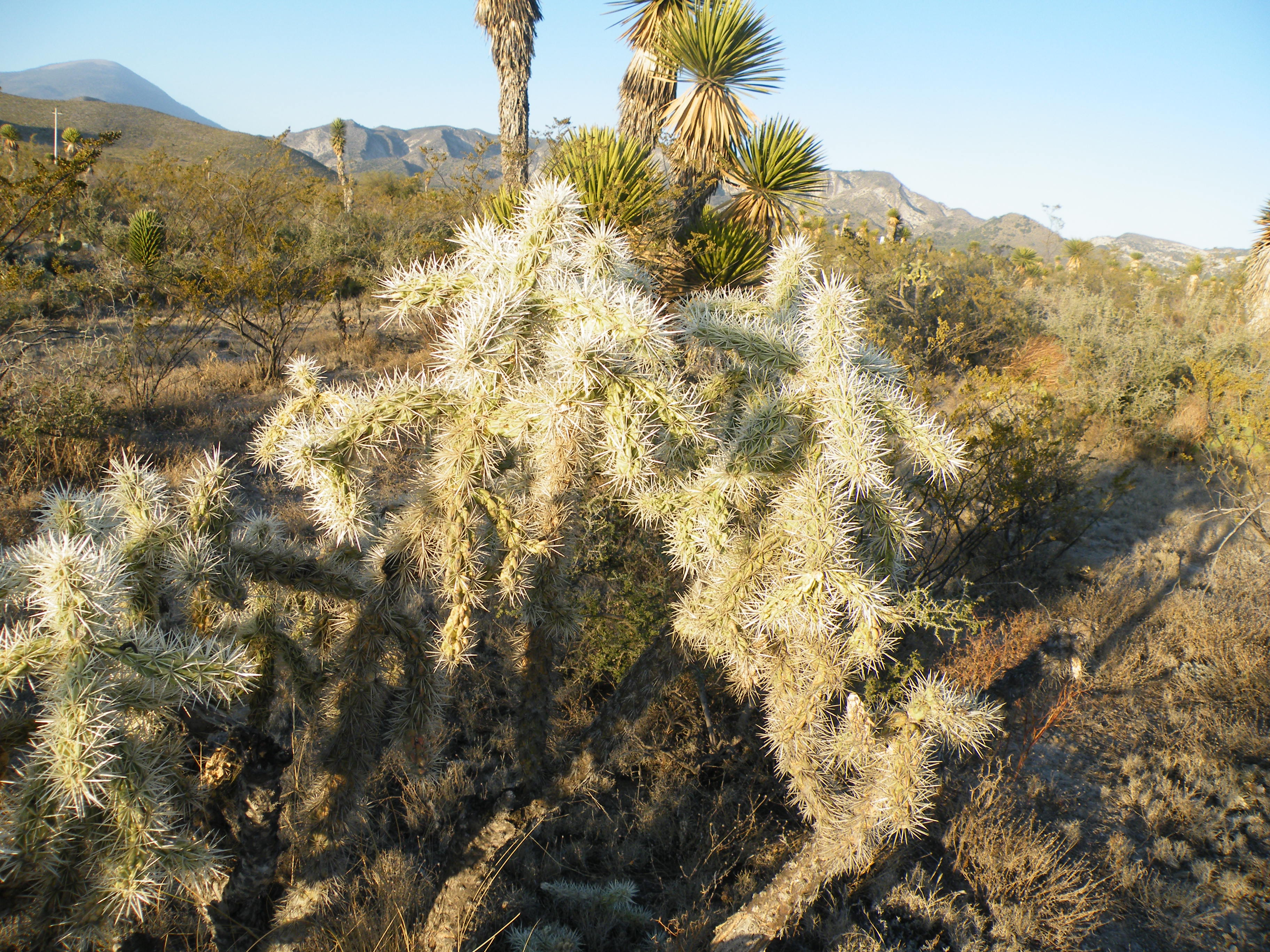

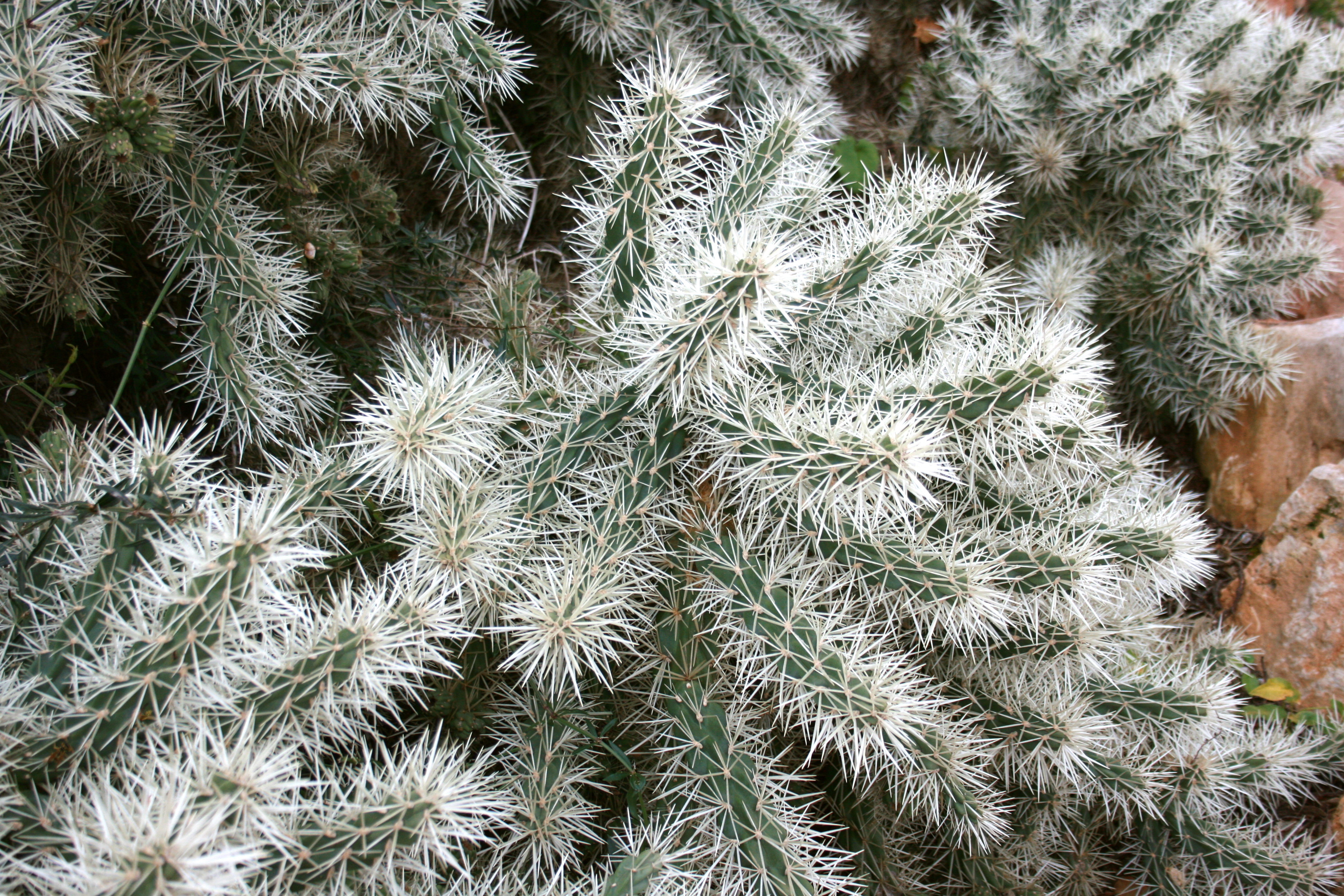

Conservation status
- Least Concern (IUCN 3.1)

Scientific classification
- Kingdom: Plantae
- Clade: Tracheophytes
- Clade: Angiosperms
- Clade: Eudicots
- Order: Caryophyllales
- Family: Cactaceae
- Genus: Cylindropuntia
- Species: C. tunicata

Binomial name
- Cylindropuntia tunicata (Lehm.) F.M.Knuth

Synonyms
- List: Cactus tunicatus Lehm.; Grusonia tunicata (Lehm.) G.D.Rowley; Opuntia tunicata (Lehm.) Pfeiff.; Cylindropuntia tunicata var. aricensis F.Ritter; Cylindropuntia tunicata var. chilensis F.Ritter; Opuntia exuviata DC.; Opuntia exuviata var. angustior DC.; Opuntia exuviata var. spinosior DC.; Opuntia exuviata var. viridior Salm-Dyck; Opuntia furiosa H.L.Wendl.; Opuntia puelchana A.Cast.; Opuntia stapeliae DC.; Opuntia tunicata var. chilensis (F.Ritter) A.E.Hoffm.; Opuntia tunicata var. laevior Salm-Dyck; Opuntia undulata Pfeiff.

= Cylindropuntia tunicata =

Species of cactus

Cylindropuntia tunicata, commonly referred to as sheathed cholla, is a species of flowering plant in the family Cactaceae. This cholla species is native to the Chihuahuan Desert of North America and parts of South America. Is also known as Brown-spined Hudson pear.

== Distribution ==
=== As an agricultural weed ===
C. tunicata is an invasive species affecting agriculture in Queensland, Australia. It has spines up to 7 cm long that cause painful injuries to people, livestock, working dogs, pets and damage tyres on vehicles.
