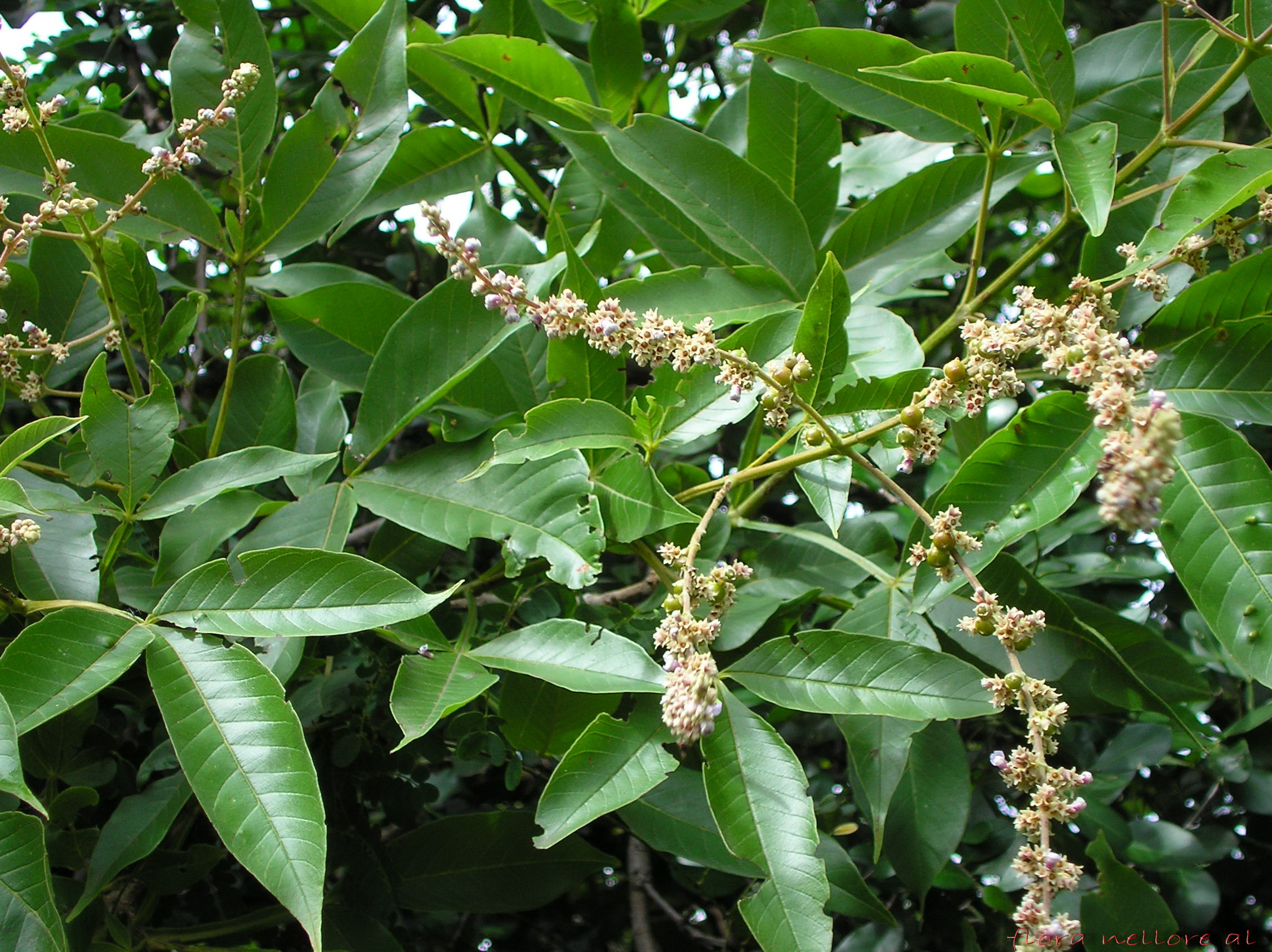
- Vitex altissima

Scientific classification
- Kingdom: Plantae
- Clade: Embryophytes
- Clade: Tracheophytes
- Clade: Angiosperms
- Clade: Eudicots
- Clade: Asterids
- Order: Lamiales
- Family: Lamiaceae
- Subfamily: Viticoideae
- Genus: Vitex; L.

Type species
- Vitex agnus-castus L.

Species
- see text

Synonyms
- 21 synonyms: Agnus-castus Tourn. ex Carrière; Allasia Lour.; Casarettoa Walp.; Chrysomallum Thouars; Limia Vand.; Macrostegia Nees; Mailelou Adans.; Neorapinia Moldenke; Nephrandra Willd.; Paravitex H.R.Fletcher; Pistaciovitex Kuntze; Psilogyne DC.; Pyrostoma G.Mey.; Rapinia Montrouz.; Tripinna Lour.; Tripinnaria Pers.; Tsoongia Merr.; Varengevillea Baill.; Viticipremna H.J.Lam; Wallrothia Roth; Wilckea Scop.

= Vitex =

Genus of flowering plants in the sage family

Vitex is a genus of flowering plants in the family Lamiaceae containing about 210 species. Common names include chaste tree or chastetree, traditionally referring to V. agnus-castus, but often applied to other species, as well, and pūriri for the New Zealand species V. lucens. Species of Vitex are native throughout the tropics and subtropics, with a few species in warm-temperate Eurasia and one in New Zealand.

== Description ==
Vitex is a genus of shrubs and trees, from 1–40 m (3.3–130 ft) tall. Some species have whitish bark that is characteristically furrowed. The leaves are opposite, usually palmately compound, with three to seven leaflets; a few have simple leaves. Most are evergreen, but a few, including V. agnus-castus and V. negundo, are deciduous; some have scented foliage. The flowers can be white, yellow, or violet, depending on the species; they are fragrant, and produced in terminal branched spikes or panicles. The fruit is a fleshy red, purple, or black drupe.

== Taxonomy ==
The genus Vitex was named by Carl Linnaeus in Species Plantarum in 1753. Vitex was the name used by Pliny the Elder for V. agnus-castus. It is derived from the Latin word vieo, meaning to weave or to tie up, a reference to the use of V. agnus-castus in basketry.

As a result of phylogenetic studies of DNA sequences, Vitex is one of several genera that were transferred from the Verbenaceae to the Lamiaceae in the 1990s. It is the largest genus in the subfamily Viticoideae of Lamiaceae. Taxon sampling in molecular phylogenetic studies has never been sufficient to test the monophyly of the Viticoideae, but it is generally thought to be an unnatural group. The subfamily is probably diphyletic, with Premna, Gmelina, and Cornutia constituting one clade, and with Vitex, Petitia, Pseudocarpidium, and Teijsmanniodendron constituting the other.

The type species is Vitex agnus-castus. In 2009, a molecular phylogenetic study showed that three small genera, Paravitex, Viticipremna, and Tsoongia, are embedded in Vitex. These three genera were duly sunk into synonymy with Vitex.

Pseudocarpidium, Petitia, and Teijsmanniodendron possibly are nested within Vitex. Sampling in the 2009 study was not sufficient to determine the phylogenetic position of these genera. The relationships of Teijsmanniodendron to these genera was not discussed in a revision of Teijsmanniodendron in 2009.

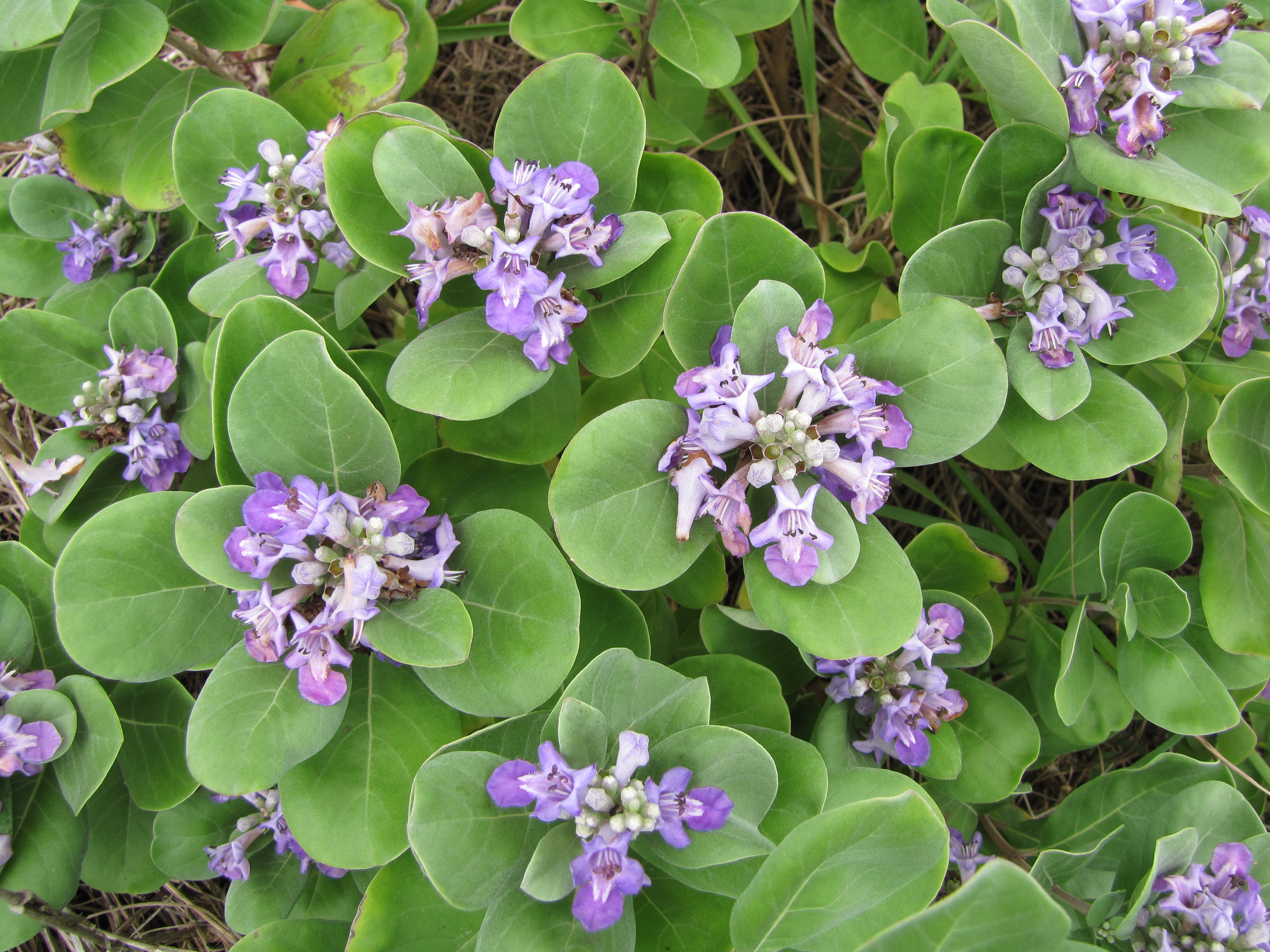
Vitex rotundifolia

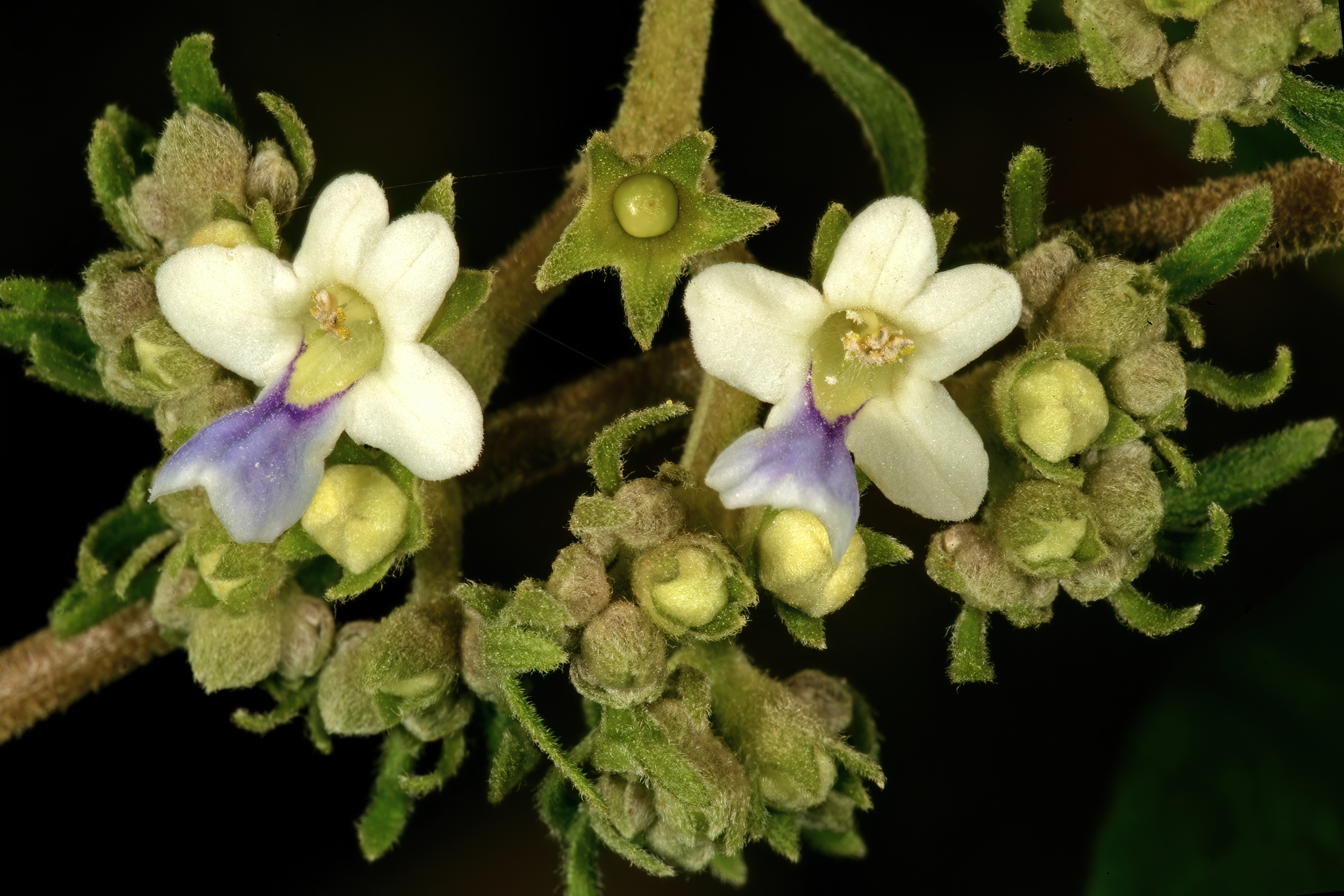
Vitex patula

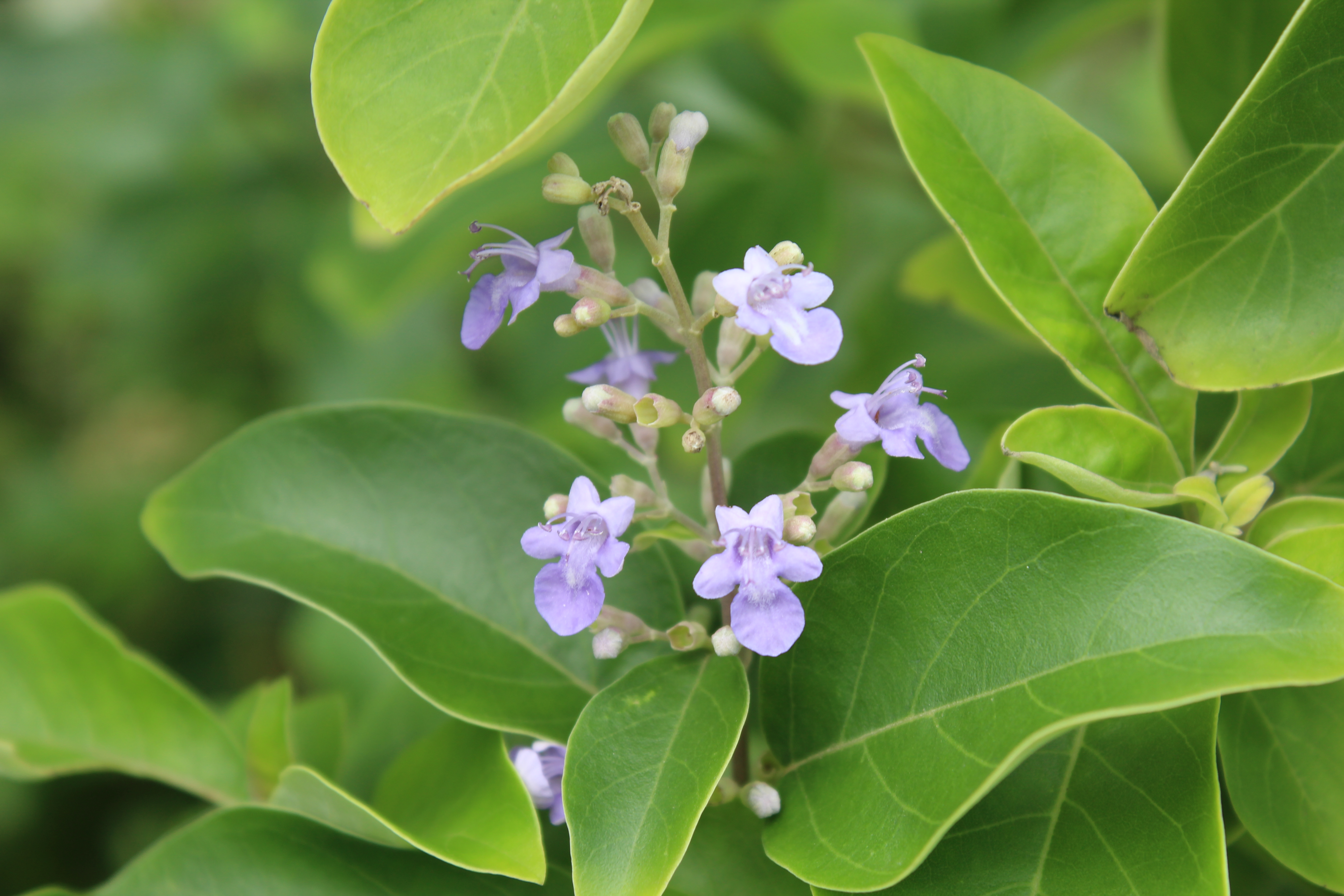
Vitex trifolia

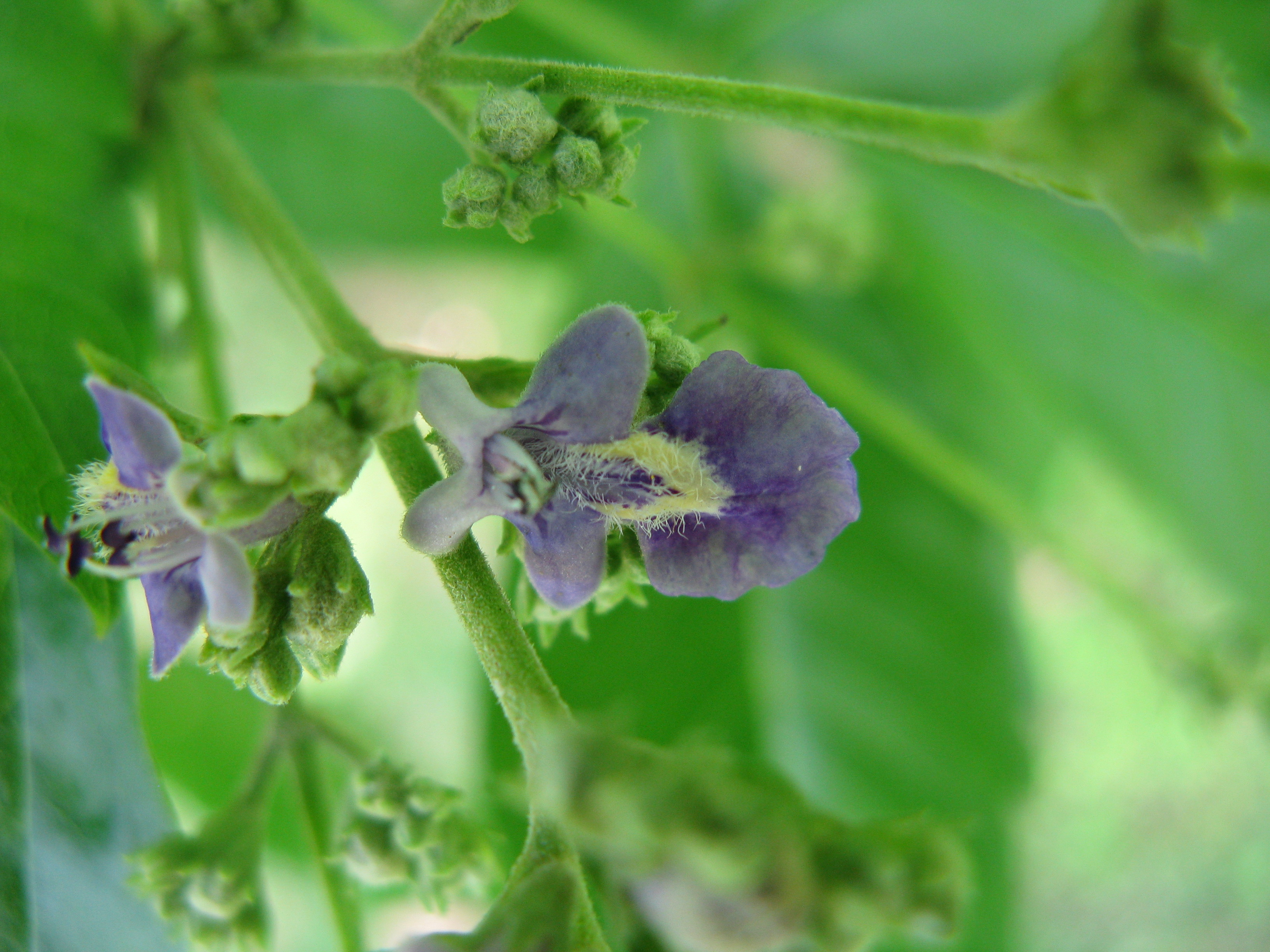
Vitex negundo var. negundo

=== Species ===
As of April 2026, Plants of the World Online accepts the following 211 species:

- Vitex acuminata R.Br.
- Vitex acunae Borhidi & O.Muñiz
- Vitex agelaeifolia Mildbr. ex W.Piep.
- Vitex agnus-castus L.
- Vitex ajugiflora Dop
- Vitex altissima L.f.
- Vitex amaniensis W.Piep.
- Vitex angolensis Gürke
- Vitex arvensis Gentallan, Sengun & M.B.Bartolome
- Vitex aurea Moldenke
- Vitex axillariflora (Merr.) Bramley
- Vitex barorum (Humbert) Callm. & Phillipson
- Vitex befotakensis Moldenke
- Vitex benuensis Engl. ex W.Piep.
- Vitex beraviensis Vatke
- Vitex betsiliensis Humbert
- Vitex bicolor Willd.
- Vitex bogalensis Wernham
- Vitex bojeri Schauer
- Vitex bracteata Scott Elliot
- Vitex brevilabiata Ducke
- Vitex brevipetiolata Moldenke
- Vitex buchananii Baker ex Gürke
- Vitex burmensis Moldenke
- Vitex caespitosa Exell
- Vitex calothyrsa Sandwith
- Vitex canescens Kurz
- Vitex capitata Vahl
- Vitex carbunculorum W.W.Sm. & Ramaswami
- Vitex cauliflora Moldenke
- Vitex cestroides Baker
- Vitex chrysleriana Moldenke
- Vitex chrysocarpa Planch.
- Vitex ciliata Pierre ex Pellegr.
- Vitex clementis Britton & P.Wilson
- Vitex cochinchinensis Dop
- Vitex cofassus Reinw. ex Blume
- Vitex collina (Montrouz.) Beauvis.
- Vitex columbiensis Pittier
- Vitex compressa Turcz.
- Vitex congolensis De Wild. & T.Durand
- Vitex cooperi Standl.
- Vitex coursii Moldenke
- Vitex cuspidata Hiern
- Vitex cymosa Bertero ex Spreng.
- Vitex degeneriana Moldenke
- Vitex dinklagei Gürke
- Vitex discoideoglandulosa De Wild.
- Vitex divaricata Sw.
- Vitex diversifolia Kurz ex C.B.Clarke
- Vitex djumaensis De Wild.
- Vitex doniana Sweet
- Vitex duckei Huber
- Vitex duclouxii Dop
- Vitex eberhardtii Dop
- Vitex elakelakensis Moldenke
- Vitex elmeri Moldenke
- Vitex excelsa Moldenke
- Vitex farafanganensis Moldenke
- Vitex ferruginea Schumach. & Thonn.
- Vitex fischeri Gürke
- Vitex flava Ridl.
- Vitex flavens Kunth
- Vitex floridula Duchass. & Walp.
- Vitex francesiana I.Darbysh. & Goyder
- Vitex froesii Moldenke
- Vitex gabunensis Gürke
- Vitex gamosepala Griff.
- Vitex gardneriana Schauer
- Vitex gaumeri Greenm.
- Vitex gigantea Kunth
- Vitex glabrata R.Br.
- Vitex golungensis Baker
- Vitex grandidiana W.Piep.
- Vitex grandifolia Gürke
- Vitex guanahacabibensis Borhidi
- Vitex guianensis Moldenke
- Vitex harveyana H.Pearson
- Vitex hemsleyi Briq.
- Vitex heptaphylla A.Juss.
- Vitex hirsutissima Baker
- Vitex hispidissima (Seem.) Callm. & Phillipson
- Vitex holoadenon Dop
- Vitex holocalyx Baker
- Vitex humbertii Moldenke
- Vitex humblotiana Callm. & Phillipson
- Vitex hypoleuca Schauer
- Vitex ibarensis Baker
- Vitex integrifolia Urb.
- Vitex iraquensis Moldenke
- Vitex klugii Moldenke
- Vitex krukovii Moldenke
- Vitex kwangsiensis C.Pei
- Vitex lanigera Schauer
- Vitex lastellei Moldenke
- Vitex leandrii Moldenke
- Vitex leucoxylon L.f.
- Vitex lignum-vitae A.Cunn. ex Schauer
- Vitex limonifolia Wall. ex C.B.Clarke
- Vitex lindenii Hook.f.
- Vitex lobata Moldenke
- Vitex lokundjensis W.Piep.
- Vitex longisepala King & Gamble
- Vitex lowryi Callm., Phillipson & G.E.Schatz
- Vitex lucens Kirk
- Vitex macrofoliola Moldenke
- Vitex madagascariensis Moldenke
- Vitex madiensis Oliv.
- Vitex maranhana Moldenke
- Vitex marquesii W.Piep.
- Vitex martii Moldenke
- Vitex masoalensis G.E.Schatz
- Vitex masoniana Pittier
- Vitex mcphersonii Callm. & Phillipson
- Vitex medusaecalyx H.J.Lam
- Vitex megapotamica (Spreng.) Moldenke
- Vitex melicopea F.Muell.
- Vitex melleri Baker
- Vitex menabeensis Capuron
- Vitex micrantha Gürke
- Vitex microphylla Moldenke
- Vitex millsii M.R.Hend.
- Vitex mollis Kunth
- Vitex mombassae Vatke
- Vitex mooiensis H.Pearson
- Vitex morogoroensis Walsingham & S.Atkins
- Vitex mossambicensis Gürke
- Vitex negundo L.
- Vitex novae-pommeraniae Warb.
- Vitex obovata E.Mey.
- Vitex orinocensis Kunth
- Vitex oscitans Moldenke
- Vitex oxycuspis Baker
- Vitex pachyclada Baker
- Vitex panshiniana Moldenke
- Vitex parviflora A.Juss.
- Vitex patula E.A.Bruce
- Vitex payos (Lour.) Merr.
- Vitex peduncularis Wall. ex Schauer
- Vitex perrieri Danguy
- Vitex pervillei Baker
- Vitex petersiana Klotzsch
- Vitex phillyreifolia Baker
- Vitex pierreana Dop
- Vitex pierrei Craib
- Vitex pinnata L.
- Vitex polygama Cham.
- Vitex pomerana Fraga, Antar, J.Freitas & Lírio
- Vitex pooara Corbishley
- Vitex praetervisa Borhidi
- Vitex pseudolea Rusby
- Vitex pulchra Moldenke
- Vitex pyramidata B.L.Rob.
- Vitex queenslandica (Munir) Bramley
- Vitex quinata (Lour.) F.N.Williams
- Vitex rabenantoandroi Callm. & Phillipson
- Vitex regnelliana Moldenke
- Vitex rehmannii Gürke
- Vitex resinifera Moldenke
- Vitex rivularis Gürke
- Vitex rotundifolia L.f.
- Vitex rubra Moldenke
- Vitex rubroaurantiaca De Wild.
- Vitex rufescens A.Juss.
- Vitex sampsonii Hance
- Vitex scabra Wall. ex Schauer
- Vitex scandens Moldenke
- Vitex schaueriana Moldenke
- Vitex schliebenii Moldenke
- Vitex schomburgkiana Schauer
- Vitex schunkei Moldenke
- Vitex seineri Gürke ex Piep.
- Vitex sellowiana Cham.
- Vitex siamica F.N.Williams
- Vitex snethlagiana Huber ex Moldenke
- Vitex sprucei Briq.
- Vitex stahelii Moldenke
- Vitex stellata Moldenke
- Vitex strickeri Vatke & Hildebrandt
- Vitex stylosa Dop
- Vitex teloravina Baker
- Vitex thailandica Bramley
- Vitex thorelii Dop
- Vitex thyrsiflora Baker
- Vitex tomentosa (Munir) Bramley
- Vitex tomentulosa Moldenke
- Vitex trichantha Baker
- Vitex triflora Vahl
- Vitex trifolia L.
- Vitex tripinnata (Lour.) Merr.
- Vitex tristis Scott Elliot
- Vitex turczaninowii Merr.
- Vitex ugogoensis Verdc.
- Vitex umbrosa Sw.
- Vitex uniflora Baker
- Vitex urbanii (Ekman) Bramley
- Vitex vansteenisii Moldenke
- Vitex vauthieri DC. ex Schauer
- Vitex velutinifolia Munir
- Vitex vestita Wall. ex Walp.
- Vitex villosissima (Moldenke) Callm. & Phillipson
- Vitex vitilevuensis (Munir) Bramley
- Vitex vondrozensis Moldenke
- Vitex waterlotii Danguy
- Vitex wimberleyi Kurz
- Vitex yaundensis Gürke
- Vitex yunnanensis W.W.Sm.
- Vitex zanzibarensis Vatke
- Vitex zenkeri Gürke
- Vitex zeyheri Sond. ex Schauer
- Vitex zigzag Callm. & Phillipson

== Uses ==
A number species are grown in cultivation. V. agnus-castus and V. negundo are the species most often planted in warm temperate European gardens; several others are frequently grown in the tropics. Most of the cultivated species serve as ornamental plants. Some provide valuable timber. The flexible twigs of some species are used in basket weaving. Some of the aromatic species are used medicinally or to repel mosquitos.
