= -phoresis =

Suffix used in various sciences

The suffix -phoresis means "migration":

- Phoresis, where one organism attaches itself to another for travel.
- Diffusiophoresis, motion observed in liquid environments where chemical gradients are generated by contact between solutions with different solute concentrations
- Electrophoresis, motion of dispersed particles relative to a fluid under the influence of a spatially uniform electric field
- Isotachophoresis, technique in analytical chemistry used to separate charged particles
- Necrophoresis, disposal of bodies of dead members of their colony in social insects
- Thermophoresis, phenomenon observed when a mixture of two or more types of motile particles (particles able to move) is subjected to the force of a temperature gradient and the different types of particles respond to it differently

== See also ==
- Apheresis ('taking away'), where a constituent of blood is separated out and the remainder returned to the circulation
