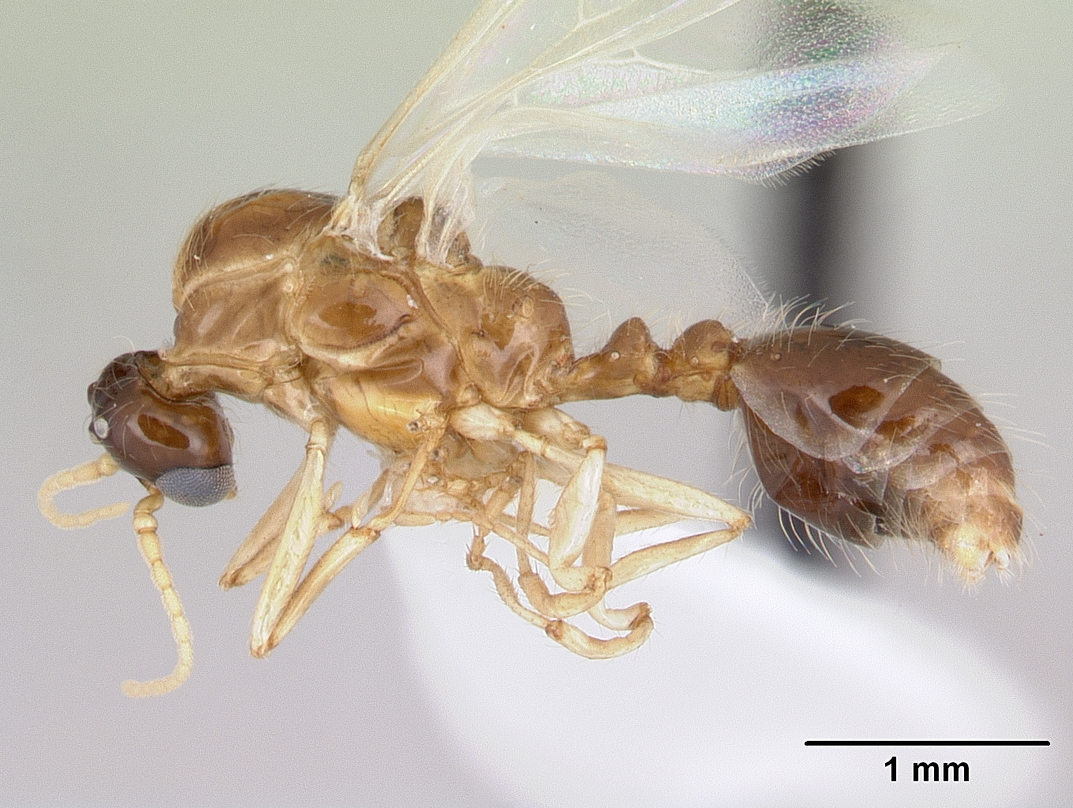
- Solenopsis daguerrei male

Conservation status
- Vulnerable (IUCN 2.3)

Scientific classification
- Kingdom: Animalia
- Phylum: Arthropoda
- Class: Insecta
- Order: Hymenoptera
- Family: Formicidae
- Subfamily: Myrmicinae
- Genus: Solenopsis
- Species: S. daguerrei

Binomial name
- Solenopsis daguerrei (Santschi, 1930)

Synonyms
- Solenopsis acuminata (Borgmeier, 1949)

= Solenopsis daguerrei =

Species of ant

Solenopsis daguerrei is a species of parasitic ants native to Argentina and Uruguay . The young queens of the species invade the nests of other species, such as the red imported fire ant (RIFA) (Solenopsis invicta). This is made possible by the fact that the S. daguerrei queen produces pheromones which are very similar to those produced by the queens of the host species. The young queen finds a queen of the host species and latches onto it, eating the food intended for the host queen and slowly killing it. The S. daguerrei queen then begins laying eggs. These are taken care of by the host ants, sometimes preferentially to their own brood. S. daguerrei only produce winged virgin queens and males. No workers are needed, since these are provided by the host species. The winged ants fly off to mate and invade new colonies.

S. daguerrei is being considered as a potential biological control agent for RIFA, which is an invasive species in many parts of the world. As of 2006, work is underway to find methods of rearing the ants in sufficient numbers to be released into the wild to reduce RIFA populations. In their native South America about 1-4% of the RIFA colonies are infested with S. daguerrei.
