= Kneallhazia solenopsae =

Scientific classification
- Kingdom: Fungi
- Division: Microsporidia
- Class: Microsporea
- Order: Microsporida
- Family: Thelohaniidae
- Genus: Kneallhazia Sokolova & Fuxa
- Species: K. solenopsae

Binomial name
- Kneallhazia solenopsae (J. D. Knell, G. E. Allen & E. I. Hazard) Sokolova & Fuxa

Species of microsporidian fungi

Kneallhazia solenopsae is a unique pathogenic intracellular microsporidium, that infects two of the fire ant species: the red Solenopsis invicta and the black Solenopsis richteri in North and South America.

Kneallhazia solenopsae was originally named Thelohania solenopsae. In the 1970s Knell, Allen and Hazard described some marked differences. Further field studies in the mid-1990s following their findings, led to the belief that Kneallhazia solenopsae could be used as a biological control agent to try to address the devastating impact of the imported fire ant. In 2008, Sokolova and Fuxa referred to newer molecular, morphological and life-cycle data and proposed that it be renamed in a new combination in a new genus. It was decided to name it after the three researchers - Knell, Allen and Hazard. There were also found to be several geminata species of solenopsae that could be used as hosts for the pathogen. It was also hoped that the pathogen could be used against other pest ant species.

Kneallhazia solenopsae has a life cycle that is almost perfectly adapted to the parasitization of fire ant colonies. Unlike other microsporidial pathogens of social hymenopterans, K. solenopsae infects all castes and stages of the host.

Kneallhazia solenopsae produces four types of spores and the most common of these, the octospore, can be detected with a microscope. Kneallhazia solenopsae infects both immature and adult fire ants. Once infected, the ants have shorter life-spans and infected queens stop laying eggs. Over time, the colony goes into decline.
