= Necrophoresis =

Undertakers of the insect world

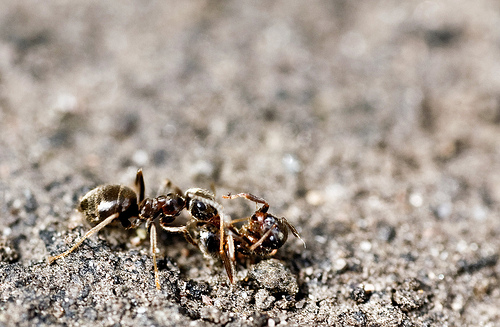
A black garden ant (Lasius niger) engaging in necrophoresis

Necrophoresis is a sanitation behavior found in social insects – such as ants, bees, wasps, and termites – in which they carry away the dead bodies of members of their colony from the nest or hive area. The term was introduced in 1958 by E.O. Wilson and his colleagues. The behaviour was however known from before with Pliny making the claim that ants were the only animals other than humans to bury their dead.

== Description ==
While the strict definition of necrophoresis deals with the removal of dead nestmates only, others have extended it to the removal of corpses that include non-nestmates and even alien species. The adaptive value of the behavior is that it acts as a sanitary measure to prevent disease or infection from spreading throughout the colony.

== Castes and specialization ==
Although any member of a colony can carry the bodies, it is usually done by designated 'undertakers'. Ant undertakers have a slightly altered development cycle, and are much more likely than other ants to handle corpse removal. They are not restricted to performing only this task, but they do exhibit different behavioral and movement patterns than other members of the colony, which assist them in this task. Non-undertaker ants may also remove dead bodies, but do so with much less consistency. Corpses will either be taken to a random point a certain distance away from the nest, or placed in a refuse pile closer to the nest, along with other waste. Although in mature ant colonies only workers feature undertaking behaviours, the queen ants from the Lasius niger species undertake deceased co-founders.

The removal of corpses carrying infectious disease is crucial to the health of a colony. Efforts to eliminate colonies of fire ants, for instance, include introducing pathogens into the population, but this has limited efficacy where the infected insects are quickly separated from the population. However, certain infections have been shown to delay the removal of dead bodies or alter where they are placed. Although placing corpses farther away reduces the risk of infection, it also requires more energy. Burial and cannibalism are other recorded methods of corpse disposal among social insects. Termites have been shown to use burial when they cannot afford to devote workers to necrophoresis, especially when forming a new colony.

== Identification of disease and death ==
Differentiating between dead and living insects is accomplished by detecting their chemical signature. Depending on the species, this can be communicated by either the absence of chemicals that are present when they are alive, or by those released in decaying corpses. Experiment have sought to identify how ants identify corpses that need to be disposed and have found that in some cases it is the presence of oleic and linoleic acid, produced by the breakdown of fats. This breakdown can take about two days. There are also differences in how dead nestmates and non-nestmates are treated. Seed collection and dispersal behaviors in myrmecochory are also found to be similar to those involved in necrophory and triggered by similar chemicals.
