= Ants of medical importance =

Ants capable of harming humans

Most ants are capable of biting, stinging, and spraying irritant chemicals. However, only relatively few species can harm humans; among which some can cause significant injury or, in rare cases, death. Like wasps, individual ants are capable of stinging multiple times as they do not lose their stingers.

== Fire ants ==
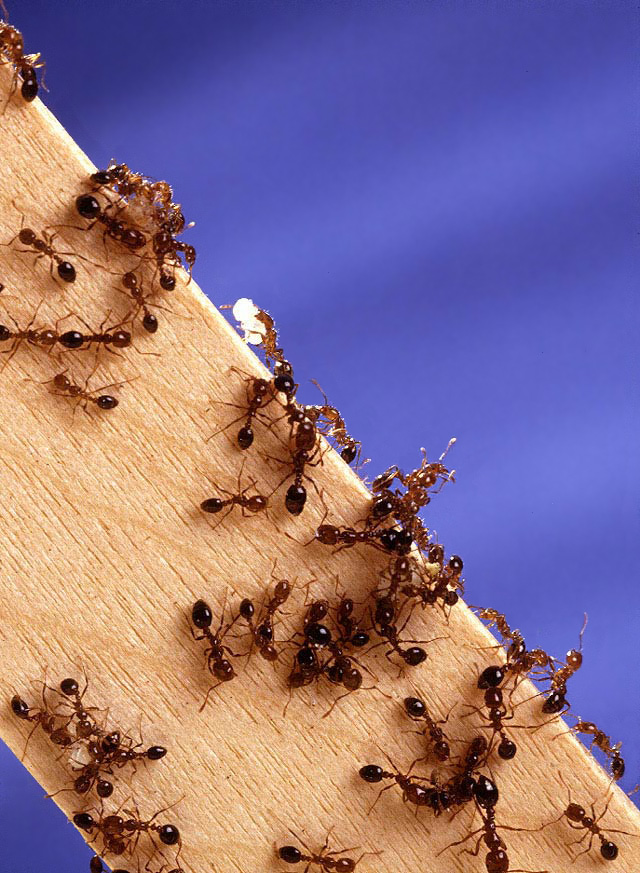
Red imported fire ant, Solenopsis invicta

The fire ants are a group of 20 species of New World ants which are reputed after their aggressiveness and painful stings. Four species are considered of relevant medical importance: Solenopsis invicta, Solenopsis richteri, Solenopsis geminata, and Solenopsis saevissima. The Red Imported Fire Ant S. invicta is the best studied among them, and reputed as the most dangerous species. S. invicta is expanding in range around the world and thus it is most often involved in medical emergencies. A person typically encounters problems with fire ants by inadvertently stepping onto one of their mounds, which causes the ants to swarm up the person's legs, attacking en masse. The ants quickly respond to alarm pheromones that are released by the first disturbed ants, causing a swarm followed by aggressive stinging. Fire ant stings are typically accompanied by burning and urticaria, followed by a welt formation. The welts often develop into white pustules that should not be scratched, as to avoid secondary infections. A few individuals are sensitive to the venom, and can, on rare occasions, die of anaphylaxis. In a survey of 29,300 physicians in the United States of America (in 1989), reports of 83 fatalities were obtained. Some fire ant attacks on humans confined to beds have also been noted; in some locations, fire ants can be a particular threat in medical facilities since they can have nesting colonies inside human habitations.

It has been demonstrated that, whilst the burning sensation and pustule formation is an effect of the sting injecting insoluble venom alkaloids, the more serious allergic reactions are caused by venom protein allergens.

== Other species ==
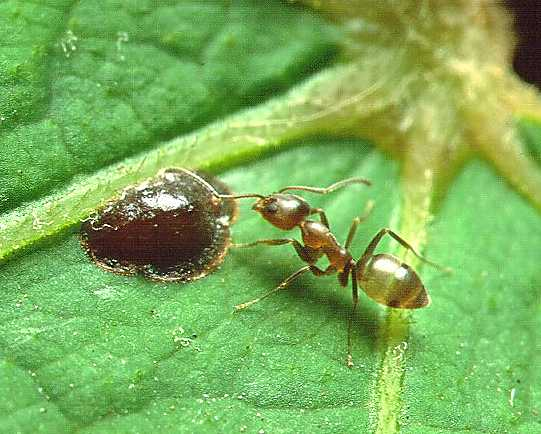
Argentine ant

Apart from Solenopsis invicta and Solenopsis richteri, serious allergic reactions are known from ants belonging to 6 different subfamilies (Formicinae, Myrmeciinae, Ponerinae, Ectatomminae, Myrmicinae, and Pseudomyrmecinae) and 10 genera (Solenopsis, Formica, Myrmecia, Tetramorium, Pogonomyrmex, Pachycondyla, Odontomachus, Rhytidoponera, Pseudomyrmex, and Hypoponera).

The Argentine ant, Linepithema humile is found in Argentina, Southern Europe, Southern US and California. They are small and are found in human habitations. They often kill other ant species. They have been noted as having the potential to carry pathogens in hospital environments.

The pharaoh ant, Monomorium pharaonis is found around the world. It is not known for its sting, but has been involved in respiratory allergies

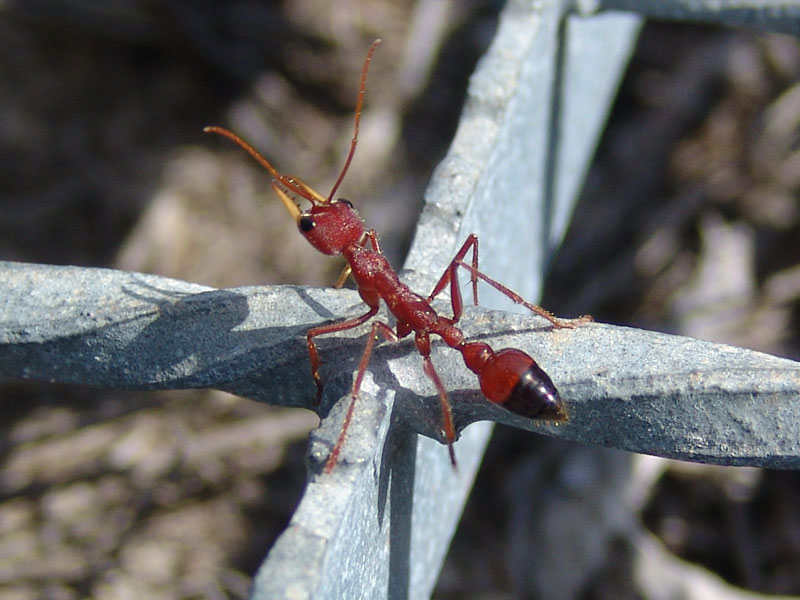
Red bulldog ant

Bulldog ants, from the genus Myrmecia, are native to Australia, with all but one of the ninety or so species found on the continent. Belonging to the ant subfamily Myrmeciinae, they are among the most primitive extant ants in the world. This species is known to cause some fatalities in sensitive humans.

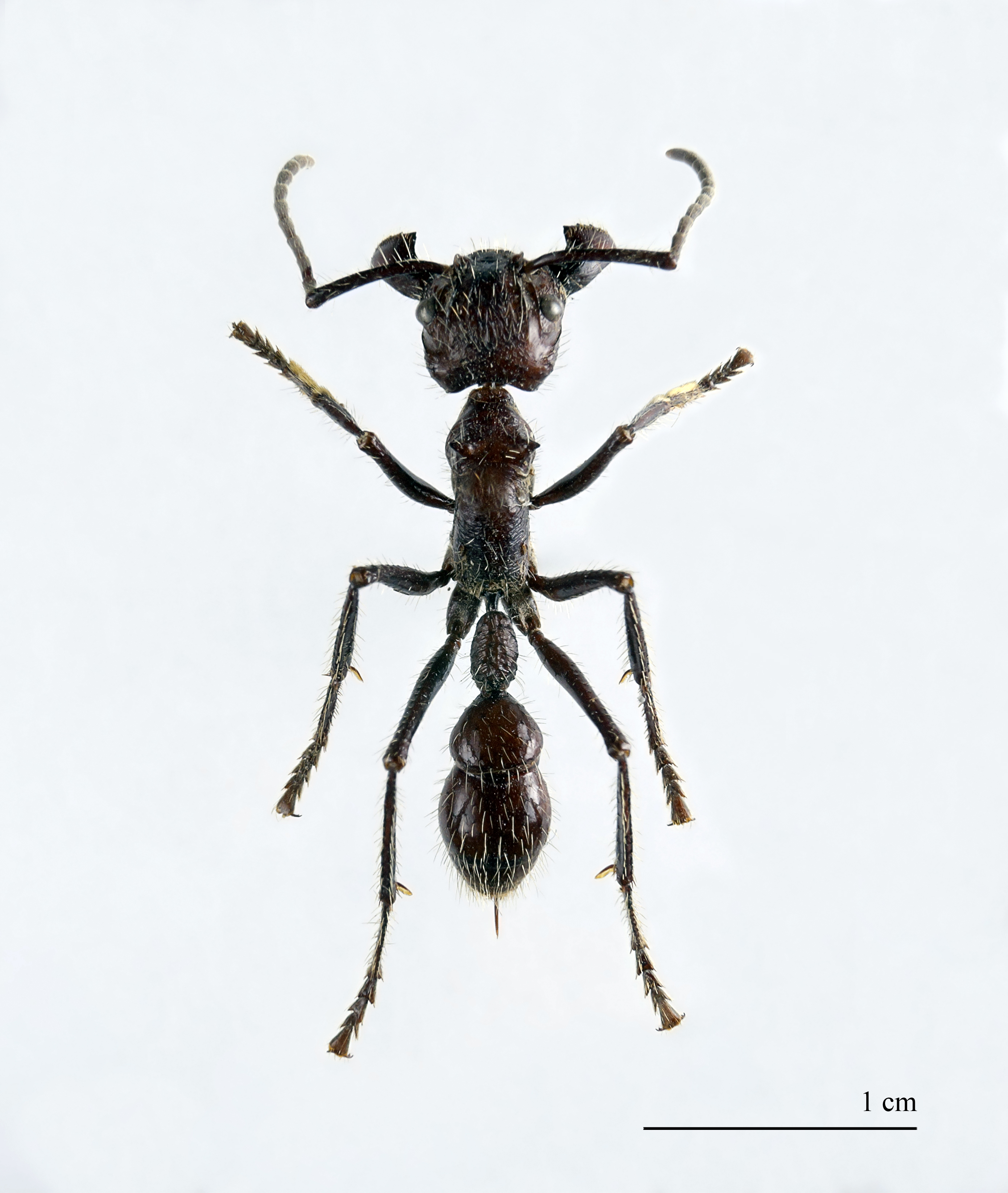
Bullet ant

Bullet ants, from the genus Paraponera, are found from Nicaragua southward to the Amazon Basin. They are and close relatives of the genus Dinoponera, which are New World ponerines known for their painful stings.

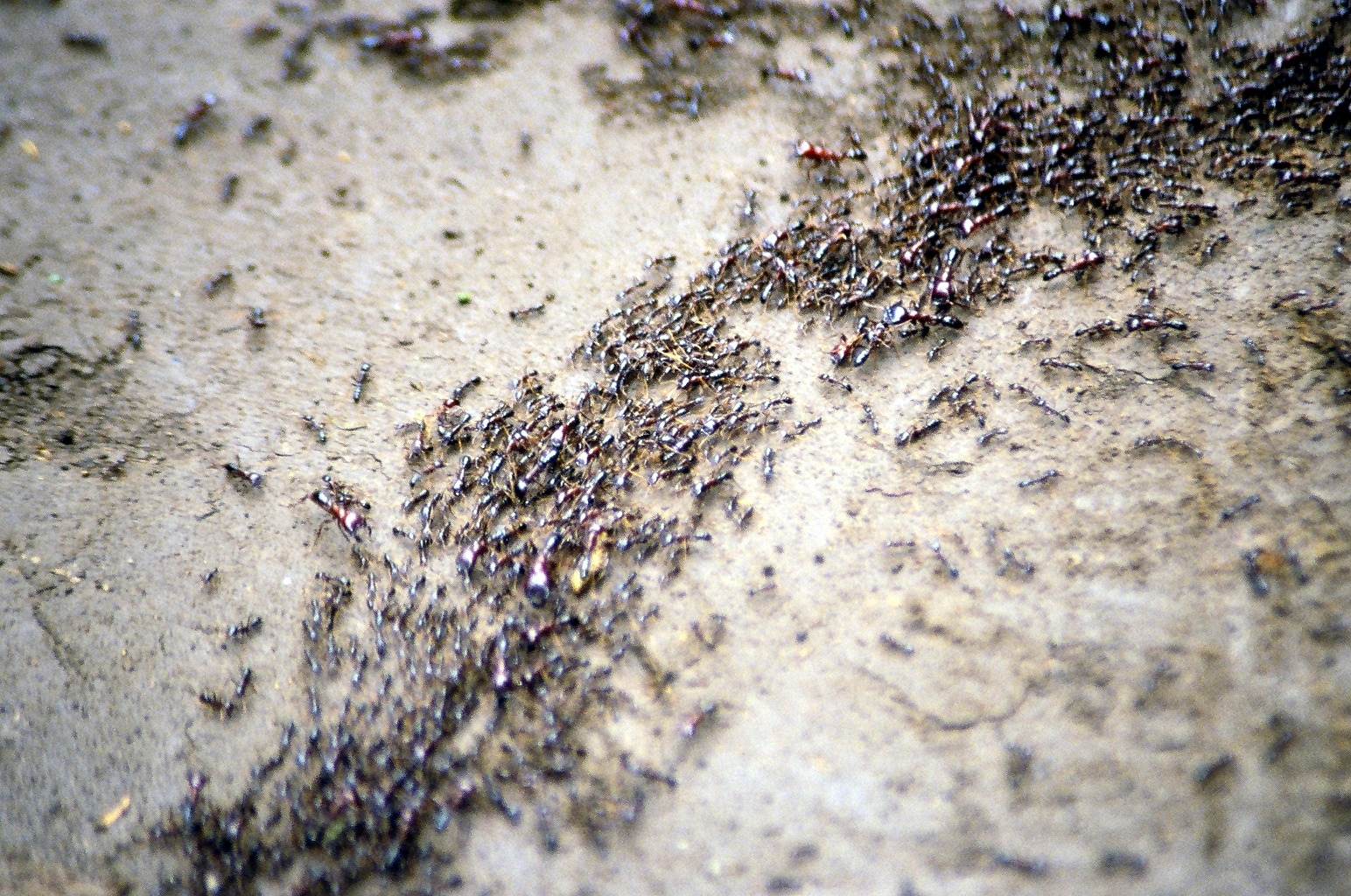
Driver ants

Driver ants, from the genus Dorylus, are found in the Old World, especially West Africa and the Congo Basin. Unlike the army ants of the New World, Old World army ants have a functional sting but rarely use it, preferring their razor-sharp, falcate mandibles for defense instead. Dorylus spp. colonies also reach larger sizes than Eciton.

The Pogonomyrmex maricopa, found in Western US, are bright red myrmicine ants whose venom is the most potent of any ant species.

== See also ==
- Killer bee
