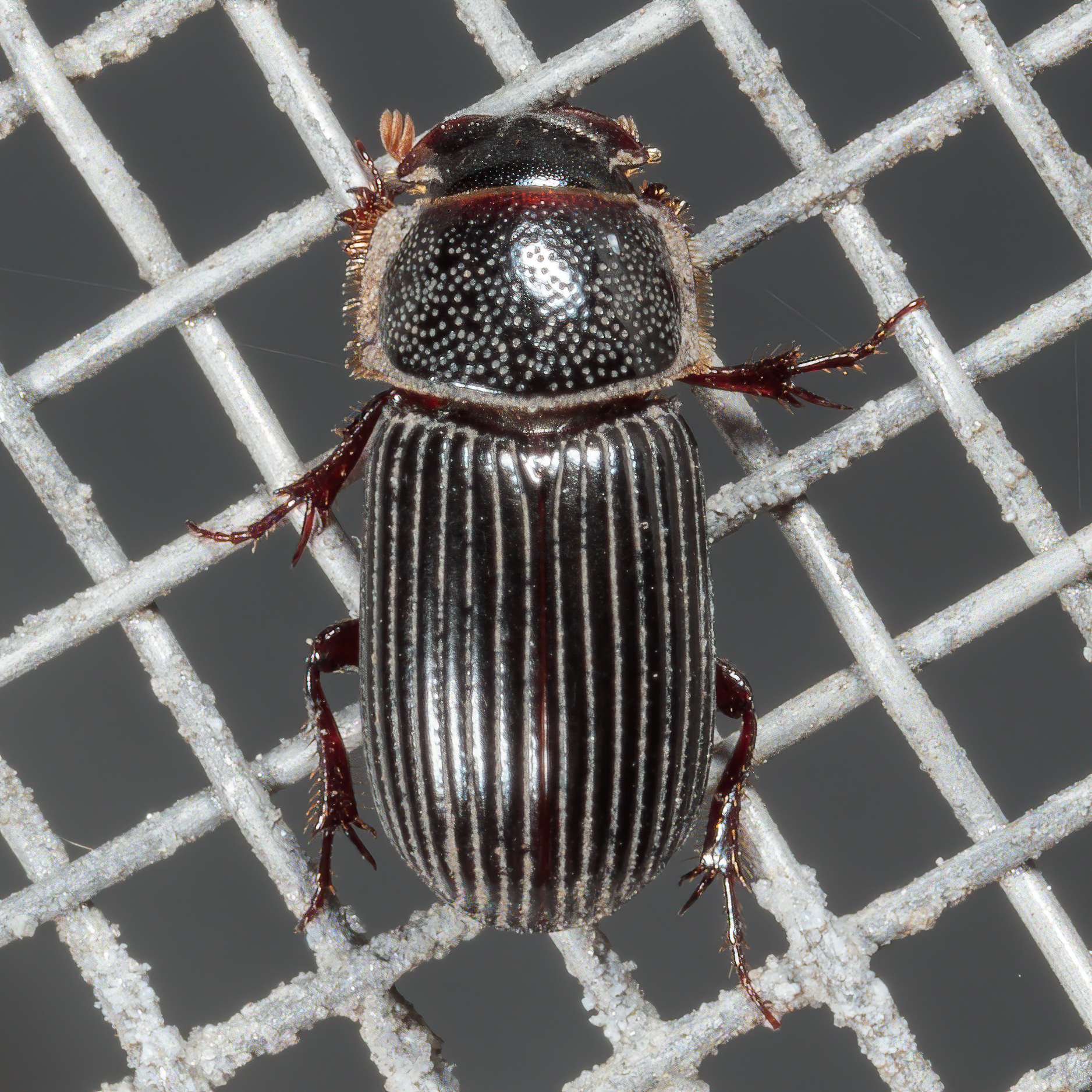
- Martineziana dutertrei, Texas

Scientific classification
- Kingdom: Animalia
- Phylum: Arthropoda
- Clade: Pancrustacea
- Class: Insecta
- Order: Coleoptera
- Suborder: Polyphaga
- Infraorder: Scarabaeiformia
- Family: Scarabaeidae
- Genus: Martineziana
- Species: M. dutertrei

Binomial name
- Martineziana dutertrei (Chalumeau, 1983)

Synonyms
- Martinezia dutertrei Chalumeau, 1983

= Martineziana dutertrei =

Species of beetle

Martineziana dutertrei is a species of aphodiine dung beetle in the family Scarabaeidae. It is found in Argentina, Bolivia, Brazil (Acre, Amazonas, Mato Grosso, Rio Grande do Sul), Chile, Cuba, the Dominican Republic, Guyana, Paraguay, as well as in the United States (Alabama, Florida, Georgia, Indiana, Louisiana, Mississippi, North Carolina, South Carolina, Virginia, Texas).

== Description ==
Adults reach a length of about 5.6 mm (0.22 in). The body is thin and dark piceous. The head has longitudinal wrinkles and is strongly gibbous medially. The pronotum has punctures of two sizes: dense fine punctures are mixed with larger ones, the latter spread across the pronotum, but smaller anteriorly and larger near the posterior and lateral margins. The elytra are long and not greatly widened posteriorly.

== Life history ==
Specimens have been found within the nests of Solenopsis invicta, Solenopsis richteri, Solenopsis geminata, Solenopsis xyloni and Linepithema humile.
