= S. silvestrii =

S. silvestrii may refer to:

- Solenopsis silvestrii, a fire ant species
- Strongylognathus silvestrii, an ant species endemic to Greece

== See also ==
- Silvestrii (disambiguation)
