= Ataenius erratus =

Scientific classification
- Kingdom: Animalia
- Phylum: Arthropoda
- Clade: Pancrustacea
- Class: Insecta
- Order: Coleoptera
- Suborder: Polyphaga
- Infraorder: Scarabaeiformia
- Family: Scarabaeidae
- Genus: Ataenius
- Species: A. erratus

Binomial name
- Ataenius erratus Fall, 1930

Species of beetle

Ataenius erratus is a species of beetle of the family Scarabaeidae. It is found in the United States (Alabama, Florida, Georgia, Mississippi, North Carolina, Ohio, South Carolina, Texas).

== Description ==
Adults reach a length of about 4.5–5.8 mm (0.18–0.23 in). They have an elongate, moderately shiny, piceous or reddish black body.

== Life history ==
Specimens have been collected on fruit of Ocotea catesbyana, on Solanum tuberosum, in debris of Pinus clausa, as well as in nests of Solenopsis geminata.
