= Acephate =

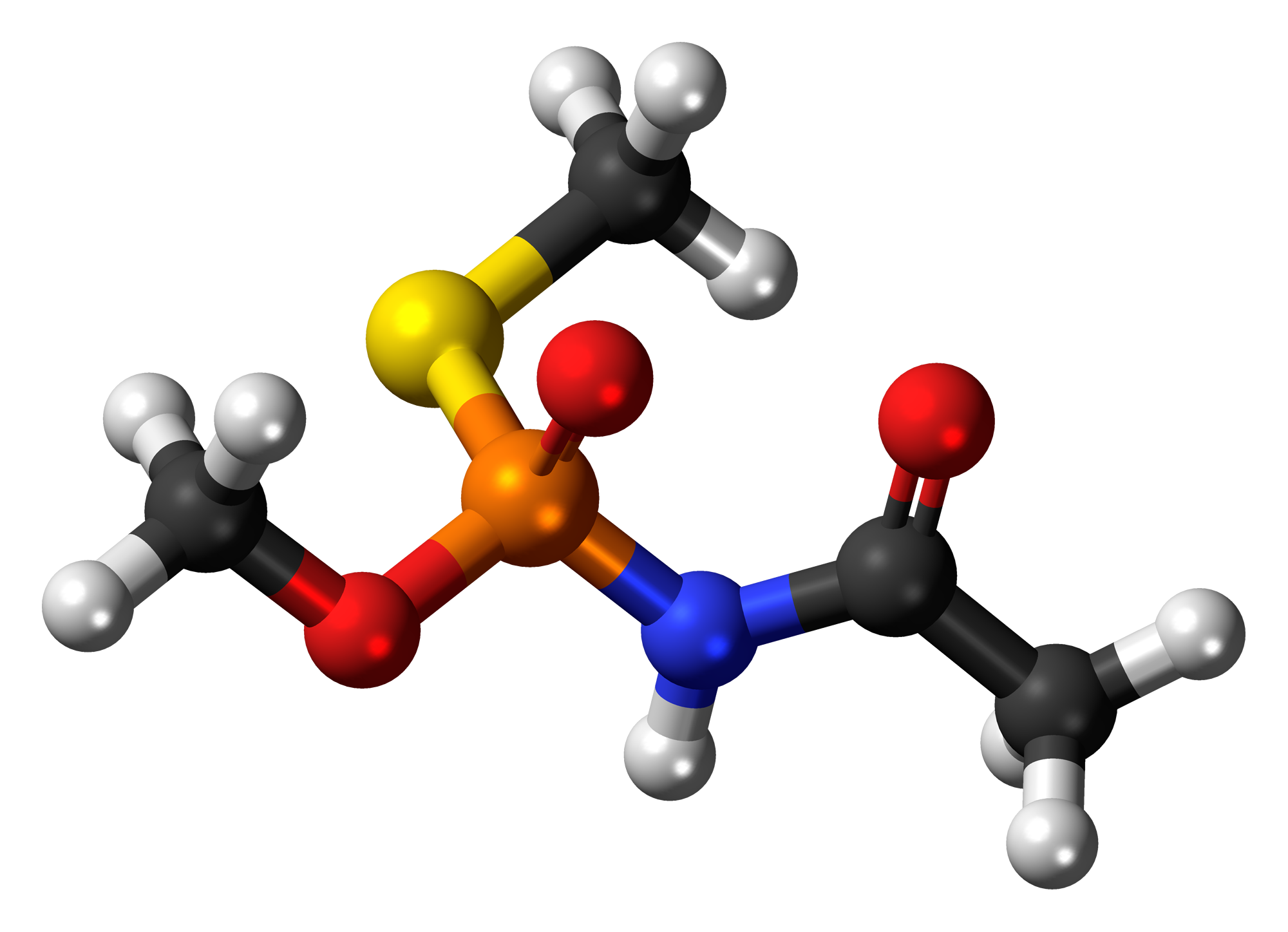

Names
- Preferred IUPAC name Dimethyl N-acetylphosphoramidothioate

Identifiers
CAS Number	30560-19-1
3D model (JSmol)	Interactive image
ChEBI	CHEBI:34520
ChEMBL	ChEMBL2133249
ChemSpider	1905
ECHA InfoCard	100.045.659
KEGG	C14426
PubChem CID	1982
RTECS number	TB4760000
UNII	3Y417O444D
CompTox Dashboard (EPA)	DTXSID8023846
- InChI: InChI=1S/C4H10NO3PS/c1-4(6)5-9(7,8-2)10-3/h1-3H3,(H,5,6,7) Key: YASYVMFAVPKPKE-UHFFFAOYSA-N; InChI=1/C4H10NO3PS/c1-4(6)5-9(7,8-2)10-3/h1-3H3,(H,5,6,7) Key: YASYVMFAVPKPKE-UHFFFAOYAG
- SMILES: O=C(NP(=O)(OC)SC)C

Properties
Chemical formula	C_{4}H_{10}NO_{3}PS
Molar mass	183.16 g·mol^{−1}
Appearance	colourless to white solid
Density	1.35 g/cm^{3}
Melting point	88–90 °C (190–194 °F; 361–363 K)
Solubility in water	79 g/100 mL
Solubility	very soluble in acetone soluble in ethanol
Vapor pressure	2×10^{−6} mmHg

Pharmacology
Legal status	AU: S6 (Poison)

Hazards
- GHS labelling
Pictograms	(GHS07: Exclamation mark)
Signal word	Warning
Hazard statements	H302
Precautionary statements	P264, P270, P301+P312, P330, P501
- Except where otherwise noted, data are given for materials in their standard state (at 25 °C [77 °F], 100 kPa). verify (what is ?) Infobox references

Acephate is an organophosphate foliar and soil insecticide of moderate persistence with residual systemic activity of about 10–15 days at the recommended use rate. It is used primarily for control of aphids, including resistant species, in vegetables (e.g. potatoes, carrots, greenhouse tomatoes, and lettuce) and in horticulture (e.g. on roses and greenhouse ornamentals). It also controls leaf miners, caterpillars, sawflies, thrips, and spider mites in the previously stated crops as well as turf, and forestry. By direct application to mounds, it is effective in destroying imported fire ants.

Acephate is sold as a soluble powder, as emulsifiable concentrates, as pressurized aerosol, and in tree injection systems and granular formulations.

As of 2012, the EPA no longer allows the usage of acephate on green beans grown in the United States.

== Toxicology ==
It is considered non-phytotoxic on many crop plants. Acephate and its primary metabolite, methamidophos, are toxic to Heliothis spp. that are considered resistant to other organophosphate insecticides. Acephate emits toxic fumes of various oxides of phosphorus, nitrogen, and sulfur when heated to decomposition. Symptoms of exposure to acephate include a slight irritation of eyes and skin.

The U.S. annually uses 4–5 million pounds of acephate.

The EU classifies Acephate as an Annex III substance, meaning that it meets the requirements to be considered a health and environmental hazard.
