= Grease ant =

Grease ant can refer to:

- Linepithema humile
- Solenopsis molesta
