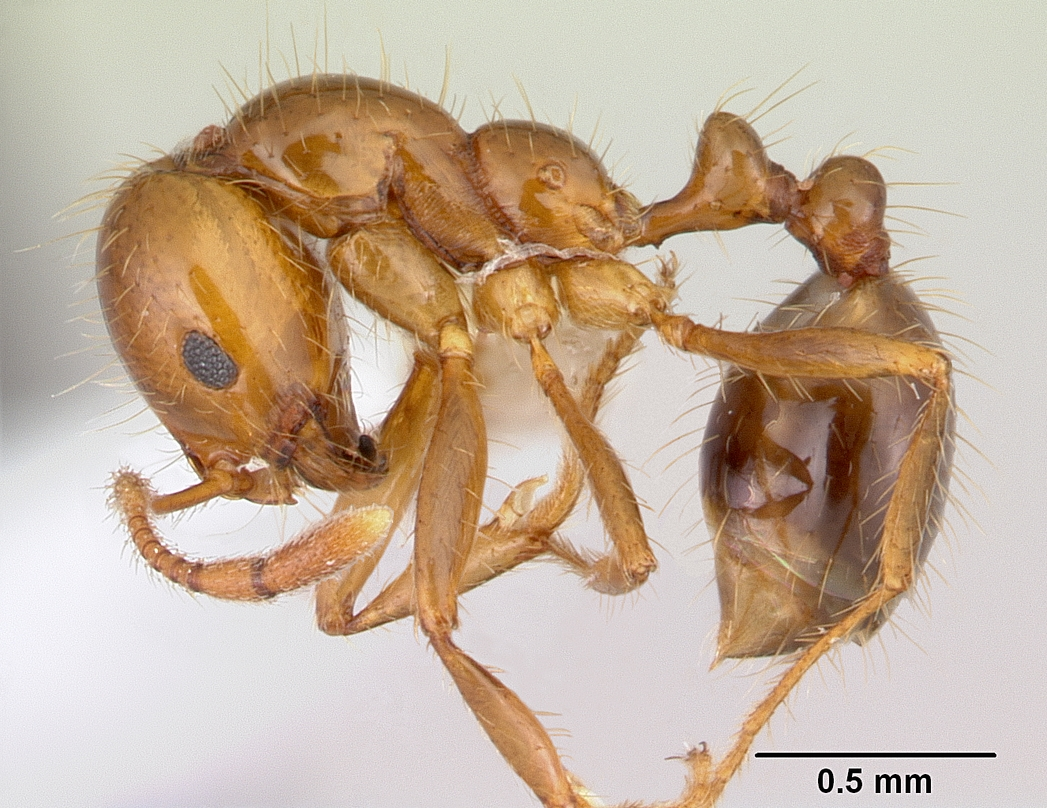
- Solenopsis saevissima worker

Scientific classification
- Kingdom: Animalia
- Phylum: Arthropoda
- Clade: Pancrustacea
- Class: Insecta
- Order: Hymenoptera
- Family: Formicidae
- Subfamily: Myrmicinae
- Genus: Solenopsis
- Species: S. saevissima

Binomial name
- Solenopsis saevissima (Smith, 1855)
- The natural range of Solenopsis saevissima

= Solenopsis saevissima =

Species of ant

Solenopsis saevissima, commonly known in Brazil as formiga-de-fogo 'fire ant', formiga-vermelha 'red ant', or formiga-lava-pés (lit. 'maundy ant'), is one of more than 185 species in the genus Solenopsis. It, along with 13 other species, is also a member of the Solenopsis saevissima species group which are popularly known as fire ants.

Although it is indigenous to South America, it has been apparently imported to Africa, Guadalupe and the Galápagos Islands. To date there is no evidence of it in the United States. S. saevissima is known for its powerful and painful sting, hence the name "fire ant". It is a pest in horticulture and one proposed method of control is to introduce the scuttle fly phorid into its habitat.

Little information about S. saevissima and its behaviors is known or studied except from a few reports in Brazil and in French Guiana. The species is apparently all polygynous across the native habitat, and highly aggressive.

== Etymology ==
The scientific name for Solenopsis saevissima comes from the Greek: solen, which means pipe or channel, opsis, which means appearance or sight and the Latin saevissima, which means "the very cruel". Its name derive of early accounts of its viciousness as reported from the Amazon forest. S. saevissima is named so because it is known to be even more vicious than S. invicta the red imported fire ants, which costs the United States millions of dollars per year in agricultural, medical, and traffic-related damage.

== Morphology ==
The typical morphology of a worker ant

S. saevissima belongs to the Solenopsis saevissima species group which includes 13 fire ant species that exhibit remarkably similar morphology, rendering morphological distinction nearly impossible without the aid of chemical characters. S. saevissima has polymorphic adult workers that differ in size depending on their castes: minor workers are generally smaller and major workers are relatively larger. The major workers also typically have trapezoidal heads and antennal scapes almost reaching their vertex; the minor workers have ovate heads and antennal scapes that extend past their heads.

Like all species of the S. saevissima species group, S. saevissima has workers averaging 1.9 mm in length, antennae containing 10 segments, and mandibles with 4 or 5 teeth. Similarly to other species within Solenopsis, it has a conspicuous central hair on the front of its clypeus that extends beyond the outer margin of mandibles. Differently from most other species in the group, it lacks a well-developed medial clypeal tooth and its propodeum is rounded. Proper morphological identification of the species is complicated by interspecies breeding and the existence of a number of cryptic species in its native range. Currently it is believed that nominal S. saevissima actually comprises at least 5 cryptic species (i.e. of identical morphology) that can be separated using chemical characters.

== Colony ==
=== Social hierarchy ===
Unlike S. invicta, which has been identified as unicolonial ants (polygynous colonies coalescing into one giant supercolony in which there is no aggression between workers of the various colonies), S. saevissima forms monogynous colonies, in which each colony has only one fertile female: the queen and the workers are aggressive towards other colonies. The stable inhabitants of the nest, similar to those of the other fire ants, include one reproductive queen and hundreds to thousands of sterile daughter workers. Occasionally, the nest would be inhabited by a few virgin queens and several drones (male ants). The virgin queens must soon leave the nest to establish their own colonies and the drones only live long enough for the mating flight and then they die afterwards. The job of the queen is to reproduce; the job of the drones is to pass on their genes through mating with the queen; and the jobs of the workers are to build, repair, and protect the nest, to care for the brood, and to feed everyone.

=== Eusociality ===
S. saevissima, similar to the other social insects in the order Hymenoptera, is eusocial: an extreme form of kin selection in which members of a group willingly give up their reproductive abilities in favor of the reproductive success of their close relatives. For S. saevissima, the workers are all sterile female daughters who dedicate their lives to the caring and protection of their future sisters: the broods of the fertile queen (their mother). In eusociality, the sterile ants often perform specialized tasks to effectively care for the reproductive queen, including group defense and self-sacrifice.

=== Haplodiploidy and Hamilton's rule ===
All Solenopsis species has the haplodiploid sex-determination system, in which the females are developed from the merging of a sperm and an egg and the males are developed from an unfertilized egg. Ideally, according to Hamilton's rule, the female workers would all share the same father and therefore receive the same X chromosome from him and then receive one of the two possible X chromosomes from their mother, which should result in 3/4 relatedness. However, because it is unknown as to whether the S. saevissima queen mates with only one single drone or multiple drones, one can only assume that the sister workers are related to each other and the immature broods by 50% - 75%. This is still closer than the 50% relatedness the workers would have had with their own daughters. Then it is no surprise that the eusocial workers do give up their reproductive ability to take care of their sisters because, mathematically, they are able to pass on more of their genes in this method. But of course they are only related to their brothers by 1/4, so haplodiploidy alone does not explain the origin of eusociality.

== Behavior ==
=== Foraging ===
S. saevissima often displaces the other ant species within the vicinity of its nest because it is omnivorous and opportunistic and prefers abundant food supplies, therefore reducing the resources for others. Its typical diet includes sugary juices from dead beetles, isopods, and plants.

Small and middle-sized workers generally forage alone in paths of irregular loops when away from the colony. If they find a small, single food source, they will attempt to drag it back to the nest. However, if the food source is too large or is in several components, the worker will first inspect it for 10 to 30 seconds, feed itself, and then secrete a trail substance by the Dufour's gland to recruit fellow workers.

This secreted pheromone attracts and excites the workers, drawing them to the direction indicated by the trail. The trail consists of fragments of secretion and is extremely specific to each species. Intrinsically, the secretion itself reveals neither the quantity of the food nor the quality. The quantity of food is described by the number of ants in the mass forage since the larger the quantity of food, the more ants will be attracted. However the number of workers in the mass forage does stabilize at a certain level because those who are unable to reach the food leave without laying any trails. The quality of the food is communicated through percentage of positive responses: workers can choose whether or not to secrete trail substances depending on their preference of the food. The more scrumptious the food, the more trails. However, if the food is beyond the radius of 5 to 10 centimeters from the colony, the workers will abandon the trail and turn around. The longer a worker is away from the colony, the less likely that she will return.

=== Mating ===
Mating flights between the winged queen and winged drones usually occur between the late mornings to midafternoons. This typically takes place on days following a rainy day or night. The mating ritual is similar to that of the average fire ants: the queens only mate once in their lifetime, storing the sperms inside their bodies, and the males soon die afterward. The virgin queens and drones of several adjacent colonies gather together for the flight and interbreed. No intra-colony breeding occurs. Since only monogynous colonies have been reported for this species, a new queen would need to leave her the colony of her birth and establish her own colony.

S. saevissima has an extremely rapid proliferation rate. In less than one year's time, a single queen can mother several thousands of workers, males, and new virgin queens.

=== Brood caring ===
Studies have shown that the immature forms of worker ants secrete pheromones that induce adult workers to recognize and care for them. In one experiment, adult workers were observed to carry grits coated with a special chemical extract into the nest. Once inside, the ants groomed the treated grits and generally proceeded as if caring for their own broods. When the colony is disturbed, workers are seen to pick up the treated grits and run with them in the same manner as they would have with their broods.

=== Alarm call ===
When in any sense of danger, the workers release pheromones as a type of alarm call to warn their sisters. Most alarm pheromones are volatile compounds that function as attractants. Sometimes, odor trail pheromone is also secreted by the stressed ant. This then provides the sister workers with a directional guide.

=== Flooding ===
Sometimes, due to heavy rainfall in South America, floods occur. When the water rises, S. saevissima all move upward from the underground to the top of the nest. The workers then form large masses that can float on water, with the queen and the broods protected in the center. The large mass of workers eventually anchors to either a grass stem or a bush. When the flood recedes, they all return to soil and build a new nest.

=== Emigration ===
Colony emigration for S. saevissima occurs in a similar manner to mass foraging: communication through chemical signals. The workers emit an odor trail for others to follow and similar to the other chemical signals, this odor trail is also specific to each species. Migration can be caused by unexpected environmental factors such as flooding or establishment of new colonies by new queens.

== Parasitic enemies ==
=== Ants ===
S. saevissima is said to be a host species for the parasitic ant species, S. hostilis, although no extensive studies have seen conducted in this host-parasite relationship. Also, S. hostilis has not been collected since its characterization in 1959.

=== Phorids ===
At least 17 species of phorids are known to parasitize the workers of the S. saevissima species group. S. saevissima is reported to be attacked by more phorids than any other type of fire ants. The adult female phorid flies inject their eggs into the thorax of the workers. Then, the maggots decapitate the heads of the ants and eat away their brain. Phorids are especially likely to parasitize workers either during the mating flights of the queen or stalking them during forage. In defense to phorids, fire ants evolved underground foraging tunnels.

Apodicrania termophila, a species of phorid fly, attacks certain South American fire ants, although it is ambiguous as to whether it attacks S. saevissima because part of its life is spent being cared for by the ants.

== Habitat and distribution ==
=== Habitat ===
S. saevissima is native to the tropical and warm climate regions of South America, especially eastern Brazil (Pelotas). It is commonly found in the disturbed areas of grasslands and forest openings due to its workers' nature as excellent recolonizers. These disturbed sites can be manmade (farms or plantation) or natural (animal trails and riverbanks).

S. saevissima prefers to build its colonies in sandy soil rather than clays. Mounds can reach up to 10 feet in length and have over one million residents.

=== Distribution ===
S. saevissima has been mostly restricted in the eastern half of South America, with rare imports to Africa and the Galápagos Islands. It was reported in Guinea in the 1920s and Kenya in 1911, but there has been no recent collections. So far, it has not been imported into the United States.

== Sting ==
=== Venom ===
Ants belonging to the genus Solenopsis are known as "fire ants" because of the pain caused by their stings, which inject venoms. The venoms of fire ants are characterized by a variety of alkaloids known as solenopsins (2-methyl-6-alkylpiperidines) that exhibit necrotic, hemolytic, antibiotic, and toxic properties. These venoms have very small amounts of proteins, which are mainly neurotoxins that can be highly allergenic. The queens of S. saevissima , like in other fire ant species, mainly produce the alkaloid compound isosolenopsin A (cis-2methyl-6-undecylpiperidine) while the workers mainly produce trans-2methyl-6-undecylpiperidine. This shows that the assortment of alkaloid production is specific to each caste and therefore suggests that the recognition of the various configuration of alkaloid venom may be important for distinguishing the castes.

=== Treatment ===
Venom from the bite of a sterile female fire ant typically causes painful red bumps with white pustules on the skin of its victim. It may also cause severe allergic reactions such as anaphylaxis which can lead to death. First aid includes external treatments of topical steroid cream and oral medicines of antihistamines.

== Species group ==
Solenopsis saevissima is the scientific name for both a species group and the species within that group. This can cause some confusion when reading literary studies about them. This is because it encompasses a number of highly similar species which were once all considered under the name "Solenopsis saevissima". This number of species within this species group currently includes 13 individual species which are included in a group of 20 aggressive species of ants popularly known as fire ants.

The majority of the species within this group are "thief ants" with small monomorphic workers. They tend to build their colonies near those of other ant species so that they can steal their food. The rest of the species are "fire ants", including the species S. saevissima. These have larger polymorphic workers and forage for their own food.

The species group currently comprises thirteen species:

- Solenopsis altipunctata (probably now re-baptized to Solenopsis metallica)
- Solenopsis daguerrei (parasitic)
- Solenopsis electra
- Solenopsis hostilis (parasitic)
- Solenopsis interrupta
- Solenopsis invicta (invasive)
- Solenopsis macdonaghi
- Solenopsis megergates
- Solenopsis pusillignis
- Solenopsis pythia
- Solenopsis quinquecuspis
- Solenopsis richteri (invasive)
- Solenopsis saevissima
- Solenopsis weyrauchi
