= Martineziana argentina =

Scientific classification
- Kingdom: Animalia
- Phylum: Arthropoda
- Clade: Pancrustacea
- Class: Insecta
- Order: Coleoptera
- Suborder: Polyphaga
- Infraorder: Scarabaeiformia
- Family: Scarabaeidae
- Genus: Martineziana
- Species: M. argentina

Binomial name
- Martineziana argentina (Harold, 1867)

Synonyms
- Euparia argentina Harold, 1867

Species of beetle

Martineziana argentina is a species of beetle of the family Scarabaeidae. It is found in Argentina, Bolivia, Brazil (Minas Gerais), Paraguay and Uruguay.

== Description ==
Adults reach a length of about 6.5 mm (0.26 in). The body is piceous and the head has longitudinal wrinkles and is strongly gibbous. The clypeus is emarginate. The pronotum has punctures of two sizes, with minute extremely fine and inconspicuous punctures scattered and larger punctures scattered across the disc and lateral margins. The elytra are posteriorly widened.

== Life history ==
Specimens have been found within the nests of Solenopsis saevissima.
