= Imported fire ant =

Imported fire ant may refer to:

- Red imported fire ant
- Black imported fire ant

== See also ==
- All pages containing imported fire ant
- Toxicology of red imported fire ant venom
