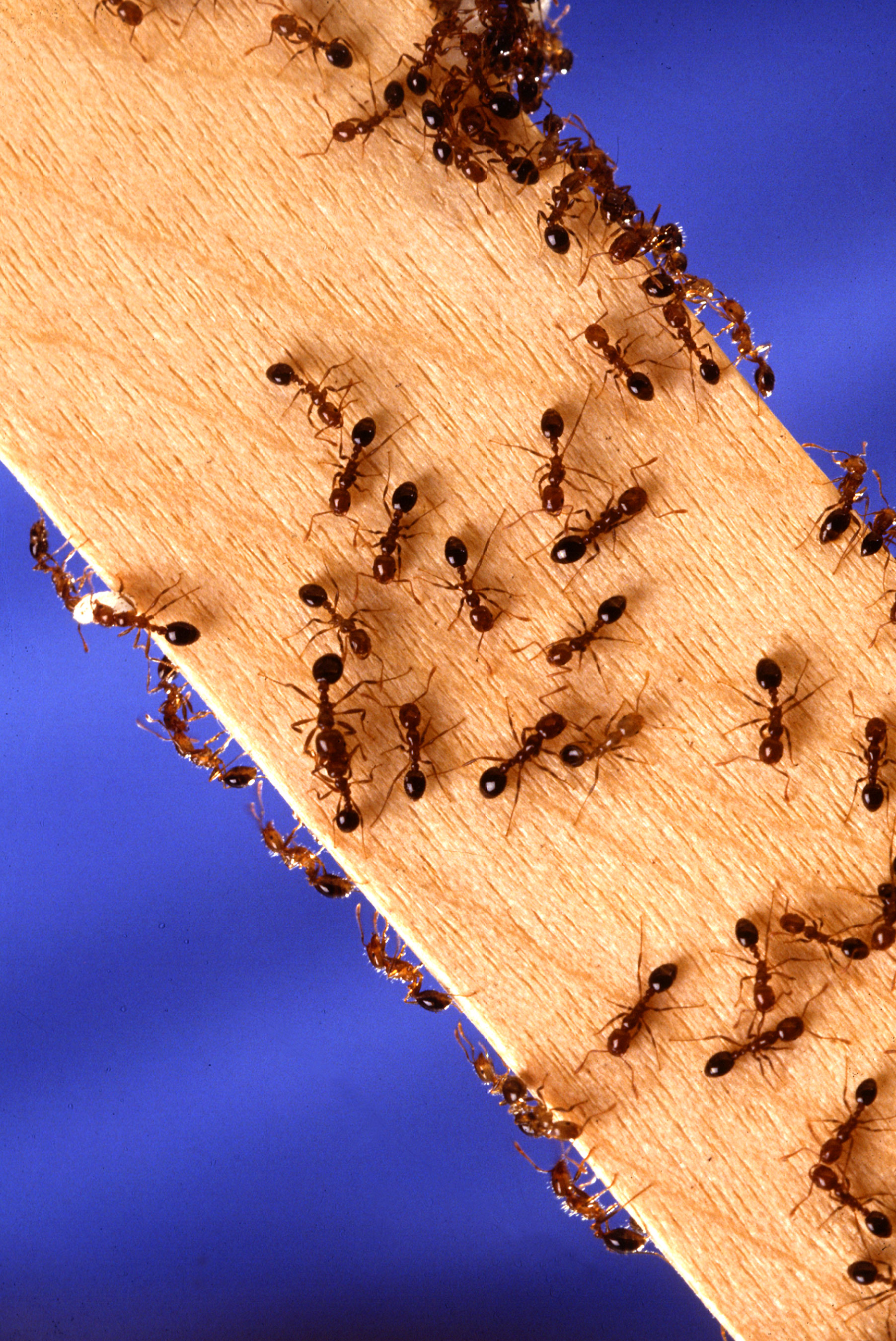

Scientific classification
- Kingdom: Animalia
- Phylum: Arthropoda
- Clade: Pancrustacea
- Class: Insecta
- Order: Hymenoptera
- Family: Formicidae
- Subfamily: Myrmicinae
- Tribe: Solenopsidini
- Genus: Solenopsis; Westwood, 1840

Type species
- Solenopsis geminata Fabricius, 1804

Diversity
- 201 species

= Fire ant =

Fire ant Temporal range: Early Oligocene–Recent

Genus of red ants

Fire ants are several species of ants in the genus Solenopsis, which includes over 200 species. Solenopsis are stinging ants, and most of their common names reflect this, for example, ginger ants and tropical fire ants. Many of the names shared by this genus are often used interchangeably to refer to other species of ant, such as the term red ant, mostly because of their similar coloration despite not being in the genus Solenopsis. Both Myrmica rubra and Pogonomyrmex barbatus are common examples of non-Solenopsis ants being termed red ants.

None of these common names apply to all species of Solenopsis nor exclusively to species of Solenopsis; for example, several species of weaver ants of the genus Oecophylla in Southeast Asia are colloquially called "fire ants" because of their similar coloration and painful bites, but the two genera are not closely related. Wasmannia auropunctata is another unrelated ant more commonly called the "little fire ant" due to its potent sting.

== Appearance ==
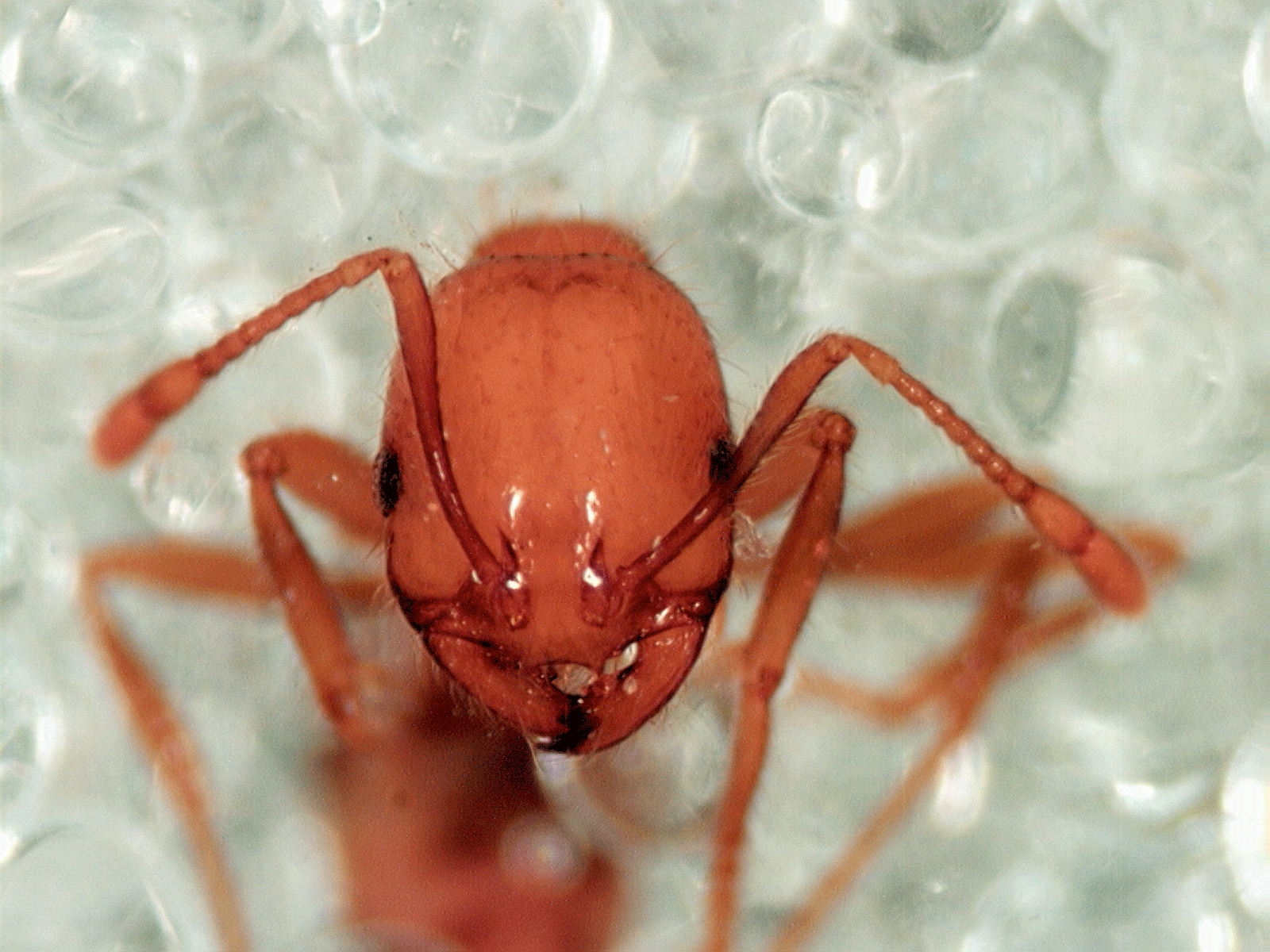
Detail of the head (Solenopsis geminata)

The bodies of mature fire ants, like the bodies of all typical mature insects, are divided into three sections: the head, the thorax, and the abdomen, with three pairs of legs and a pair of antennae. Fire ants of those species invasive in the United States can be distinguished from other ants locally present by their copper brown head and thorax with a darker abdomen. The worker ants are blackish to reddish and their size varies from 2 to 6 mm (0.079 to 0.236 in). In an established nest these different sizes of ants are all present at the same time.

Solenopsis spp. ants can be identified by three body features—a pedicel with two nodes, an unarmed propodeum, and antennae with 10 segments plus a two-segmented club. Many ants bite, and formicine ants can cause irritation by spraying formic acid; myrmicine ants like fire ants have a dedicated venom-injecting sting, which injects an alkaloid venom, as well as mandibles for biting.

== Behavior ==
A typical fire ant colony produces large mounds in open areas, and feeds mostly on young plants, insects and seeds. Fire ants often attack small animals such as small lizards and can kill them. Unlike many other ants, which bite and then spray acid on the wound, fire ants bite only to get a grip and then sting (from the abdomen) and inject a toxic alkaloid venom called solenopsin, a compound from the class of piperidines. For humans, this is a painful sting, a sensation similar to what one feels when burned by fire (hence the name), and the after-effects of the sting can be deadly to sensitive people. Fire ants are more aggressive than most native species, so have pushed many species away from their local habitat. One such species that Solenopsis ants parasitically take advantage of are bees, such as Euglossa imperialis, a nonsocial orchid bee species, from which the ants enter the cells from below the nest and rob the cell's contents.

These ants are renowned for their ability to survive extreme conditions. They do not hibernate, but can survive cold conditions, although this is costly to fire ant populations as observed during several winters in Tennessee, where 80 to 90% of colonies died due to several consecutive days of extremely low temperatures.

Fire ants have been known to form mutualistic relationships with several species of Lycaenidae and Riodinidae butterflies. In Lycaena rubidus, the larvae secrete a fluid that is high in sugar content. Fire ants bring the larvae back to the nest, and protect them through the pupal stage in exchange for feeding on the fluid. In Eurybia elvina, fire ants were observed to frequently construct soil shelters over later instars of larvae on inflorescences on which the larvae are found.

Fire ants nest in the soil, often near moist areas, such as river banks, pond shores, watered lawns, and highway shoulders. Usually, the nest will not be visible, as it will be built under objects such as timber, logs, rocks, or bricks. If no cover for nesting is available, dome-shaped mounds are constructed, but these are usually only found in open spaces, such as fields, parks, and lawns. These mounds can reach heights of 40 cm (16 in), but can be even higher on heavier soils, standing at 1.0 m (3 ft 3 in) in height and 1.5 m (4 ft 11 in) in diameter. Colonies are founded by small groups of queens or single queens. Even if only one queen survives, within a month or so, the colony can expand to thousands of individuals. Some colonies may be polygynous (having multiple queens per nest).

Fire ants are resilient and can survive floods. During Hurricane Harvey in Texas in 2017, clumps of fire ants, known as rafts, were seen clumped together on the surface of the water. Each clump had as many as 100,000 individual ants, which formed a temporary structure until finding a new permanent home. Ants clumped in this way will recognize different fluid flow conditions and adapt their behavior accordingly to preserve the raft's stability.

Fire ants dig tunnels efficiently using about 30% of the population of the colony, thereby avoiding congestion in tunnels.

== Queens, males and workers ==
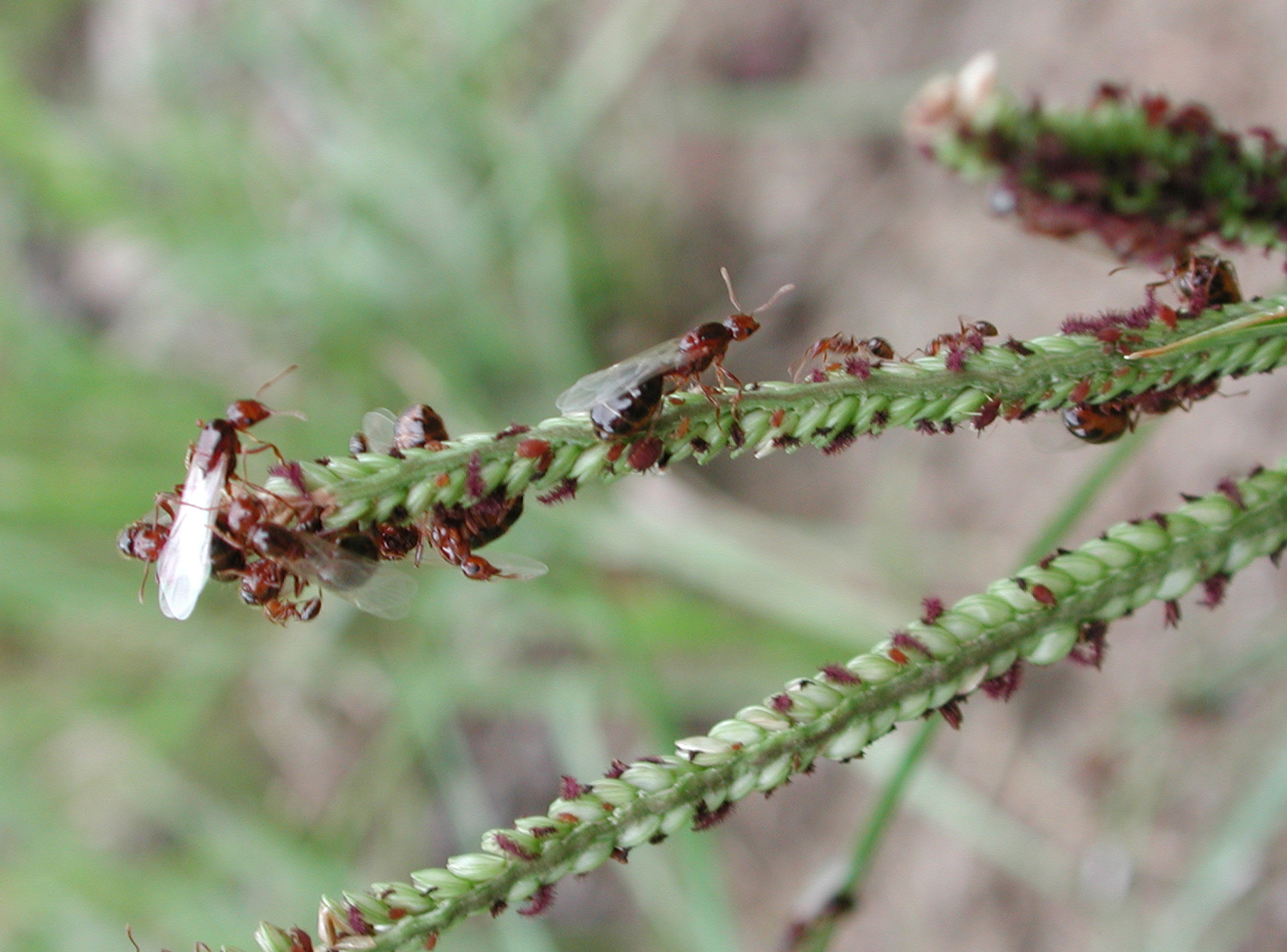
Solenopsis winged reproductive females, queens and workers

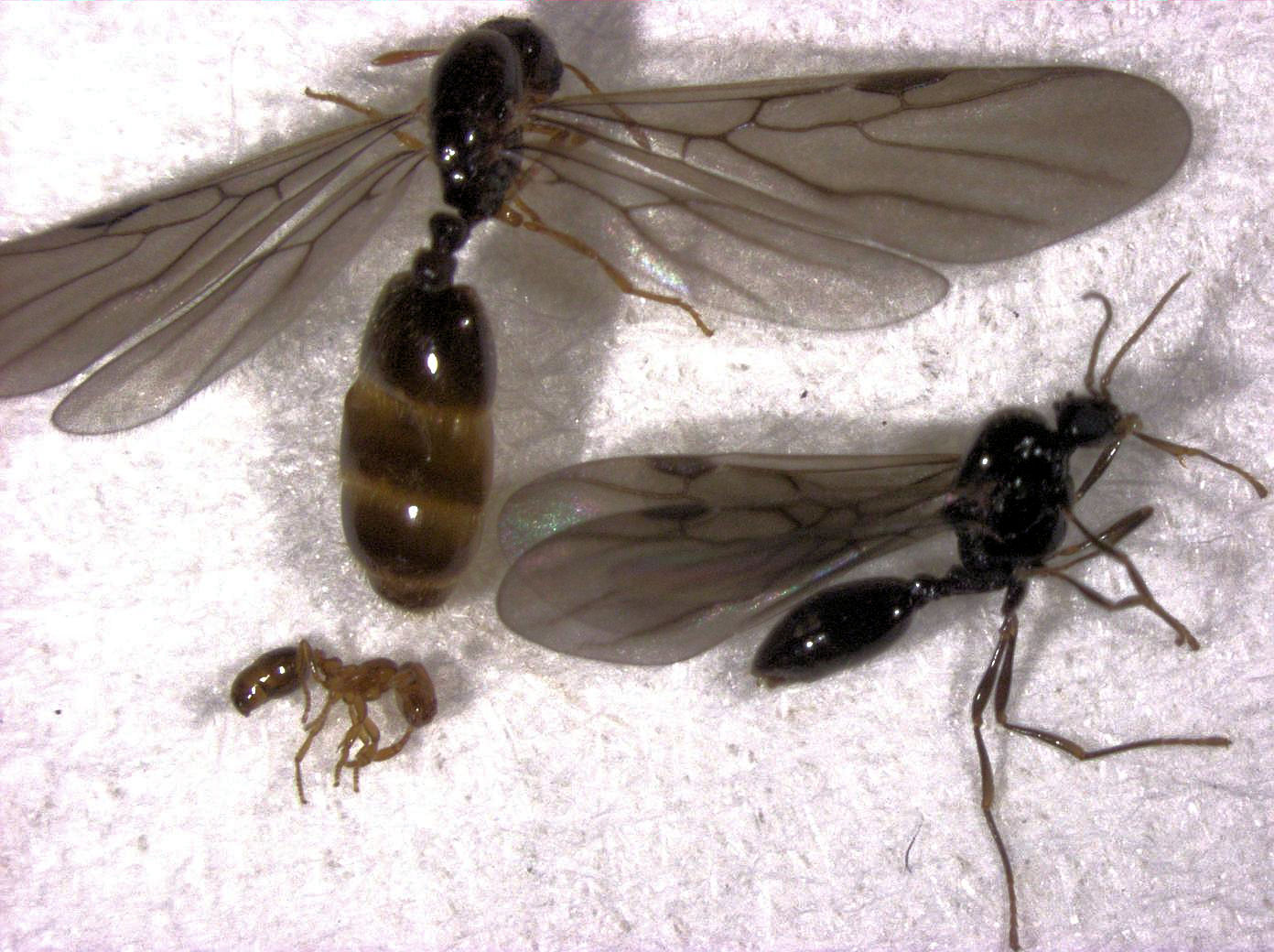
A fire ant worker (bottom), queen (top), and male (right)

=== Queen ===
Fire ant queens, the reproductive females in their colony, also are generally the largest. Their primary function is reproduction. Typically, a fire ant queen will seek to establish a new colony following a nuptial flight, wherein it will use its special venom to paralyze offending competitors, in the absence of workers for defense. Fire ant queens may live up to seven years and can produce up to 1,600 eggs per day, and colonies will have as many as 250,000 workers. The estimated potential life span is around 5 years and 10 months to 6 years and 9 months. Young, virgin fire ant queens have wings (as do male fire ants), but they often cut them off after mating. Occasionally, a queen will keep its wings after mating and through its first year.

=== Males (drones) ===
Male fire ants mate with queens during a nuptial flight. After a male has successfully inseminated a queen, the male will not get accepted back to the mother colony, and will eventually die outside the nest.

=== Workers ===
The other roles in an ant colony are usually undertaken by workers. Fire ant workers are haphazardly divided into different size classes, namely minima, minor, media, and major workers. The major ants are known for their larger size and more powerful mandibles typically used in macerating and storing food items (i.e. as repletes), while smaller workers take care of regular tasks (the main tasks in a colony are caring for the eggs/larvae/pupae, cleaning the nest, and foraging for food). However, Solenopsis daguerrei colonies contain no workers, as they are considered social parasites.

== Invasive species ==
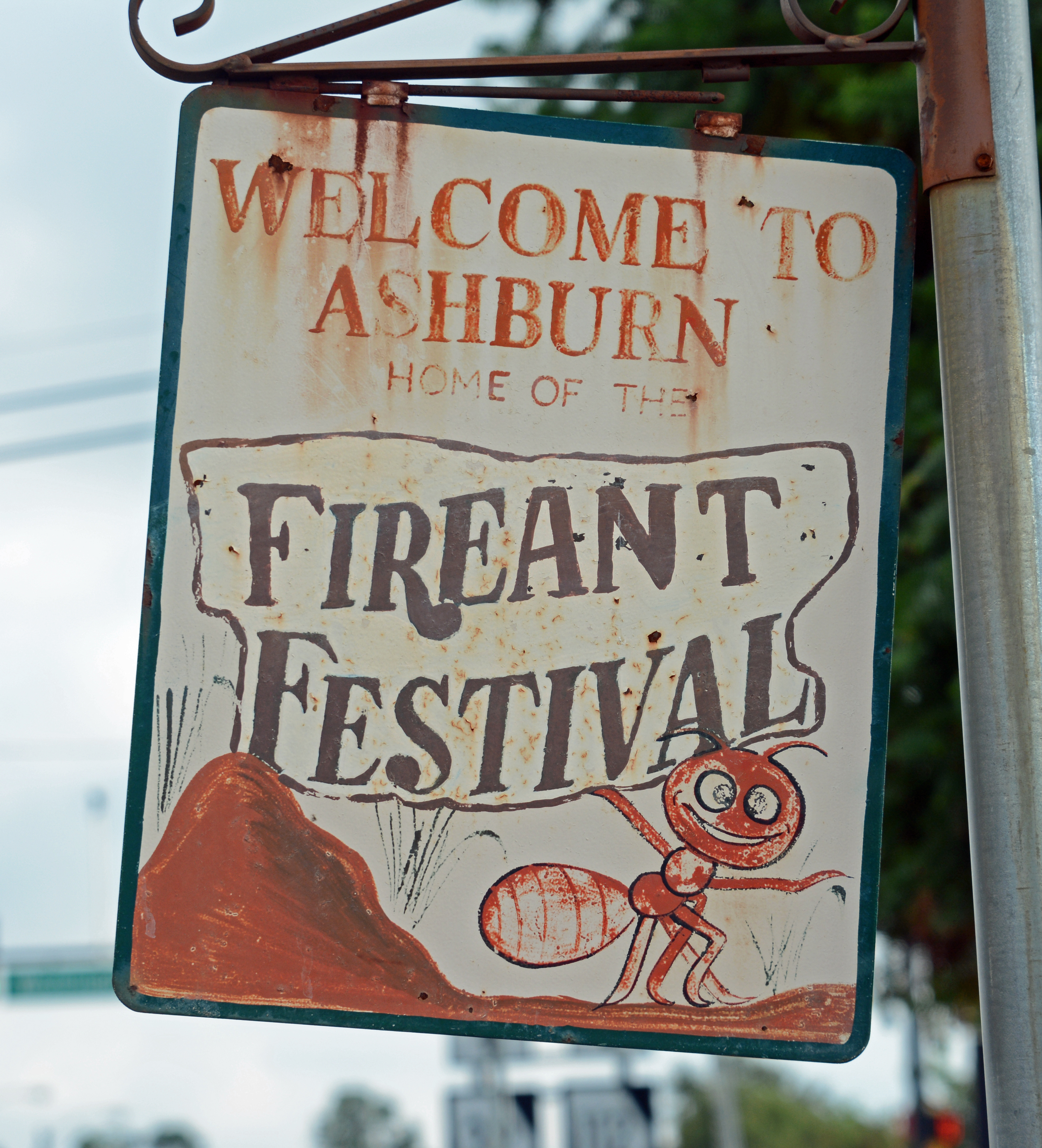
Sign for the Fire Ant Festival in Ashburn, Georgia

Although most fire ant species do not bother people and are not invasive, Solenopsis invicta, known in the United States as the red imported fire ant (or RIFA), is an invasive pest in many areas of the world, including the United States, Australia, China and Taiwan. The RIFA was believed to have been accidentally introduced to these countries via shipping crates, particularly in the case of Australia.

In Australia, RIFA ants were first identified in the Port of Brisbane in 2001, although a strategic review of the Australian RIFA eradication program published in 2021 suggested that RIFA ants may have been present but undetected in Australia as early as 1992. As of November 2023, the invasion of fire ants is restricted to an area of 7000 km2 in South East Queensland that includes Brisbane, with the colonised area bordering the state of New South Wales (NSW), with incursions reported in northern NSW on a regular basis. Outside of this region, as of 2023, there have been seven other incursions that have had to be eradicated, with all incursions linked to ports and airports, including in Gladstone, the Port of Botany near Sydney (in 2014), and the Port of Fremantle, Western Australia. Elsewhere, fire ants have been frequently intercepted on incoming cargo in ports and airports across Australia. Of particular concern, Australian researchers predict that the entire country is able to provide suitable habitat for RIFA colonization, with the exception of highland Tasmania and the Snowy Mountains. In the 21-year time period between 2001 and 2022, the commonwealth and state governments of Australia spent a combined AU$644m in their attempts to eradicate RIFA ants. In 2015, the Australian National Red Imported Fire Ant Eradication Program (NRIFAEP) National Fire Ant Eradication Program was set up and received AU$411m of funding. For the time period of 2023–2027, funding of AU$593m has been agreed. Despite the funded plan and a degree of success in the eradication of RIFA not seen elsewhere in the world, some Australian experts warn that the government on a national and state level may be moving too slowly given the size of the threat.

They were believed to be in the Philippines, but they are most likely to be misidentified for Solenopsis geminata ants.

In the US, the FDA estimates that more than $5 billion is spent annually on medical treatment, damage, and control in RIFA-infested areas. Furthermore, the ants cause approximately $750 million in damage annually to agricultural assets, including veterinarian bills and livestock loss, as well as crop loss. Over 40 million people live in RIFA-infested areas in the southeastern United States. It is estimated that 30–60% of the people living in fire ant-infested areas of the US are stung each year. RIFA are currently found mainly in warmer US states in the south-east of the country including Florida, Georgia, South Carolina, Louisiana, Mississippi and Alabama, but extend to include parts of North Carolina, Virginia, Tennessee, Arkansas, Texas, Oklahoma, New Mexico, and California.

Since September 2004, Taiwan has been seriously affected by the red fire ant. The US, Taiwan and Australia all have ongoing national programs to control or eradicate the species, but with the exception of those in Australia, none have been especially effective. According to a study published in 2009, it took only seventy years for the lizards in parts of the United States to adapt to the ant's presence; they now have longer legs and new behaviors that aid them in escaping from the danger.

Solenopsis invicta is the most famous species in this genus, especially in the US, however several other species are similarly dangerous and invasive, such as Solenopsis geminata, which has invaded most of the tropical countries, wreaking havoc in medical systems, especially in unprepared countries and islands.

== Sting effects ==
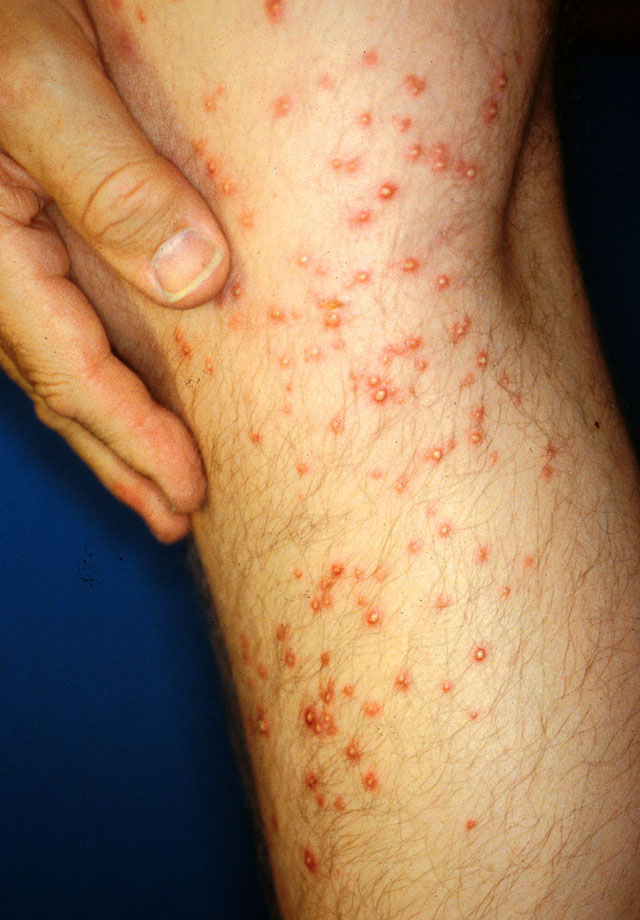
A human leg three days after brief contact with a fire ant colony

The venom of fire ants is mainly (>95%) composed of oily alkaloids structurally derived from piperidine (also known as solenopsins) mixed with a small amount of toxic proteins. Fire ant stings are painful, characterised by a local burning sensation, followed by urticaria. The sting site typically swells into a bump within hours, which can cause further pain and irritation, especially following several stings at the same place. The bump may develop into a white pustule within 24–36 hours which can become infected if scratched, but will spontaneously flatten within a few days if left alone. The pustules are obtrusive and uncomfortable while active and, if they become infected, may cause scarring. Some people may become allergic to the venom, and if untreated, may become increasingly sensitive to the point of experiencing anaphylaxis following fire ant stings, which requires emergency treatment. Management of an emergency visit due to anaphylaxis is recommended with the use of adrenaline. It has been demonstrated that, whilst pustule formation results from the injected venom alkaloids, allergy to fire ant stings is caused solely by venom allergenic proteins.

=== Treatment ===
First aid for fire ant stings includes external treatments and oral medicines. There are also many home remedies of varying efficacy, including immediate application of a solution of half bleach and half water, or aloe vera gel – the latter of which is also often included in over-the-counter creams that also include medically tested and verified treatments. External, topical treatments include the anesthetic benzocaine, the antihistamine diphenhydramine, and the corticosteroid hydrocortisone. Antihistamines or topical corticosteroids may help reduce the itching and will generally benefit local sting reactions. Oral medicine includes antihistamines. Severe allergic reactions to fire ant stings, including severe chest pain, nausea, severe sweating, loss of breath, serious swelling, and slurred speech can be fatal if not treated.

== Predators ==
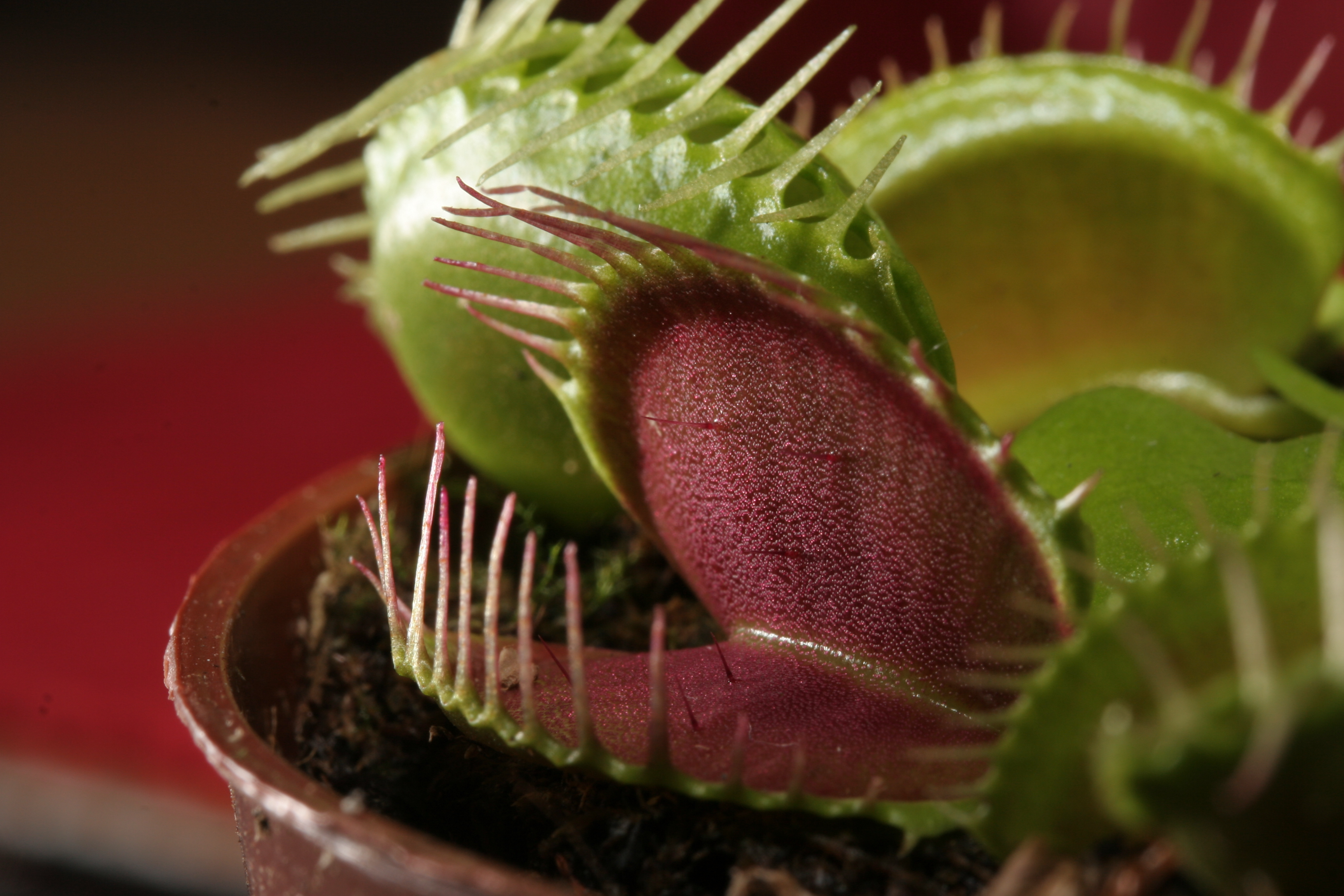
Venus flytrap

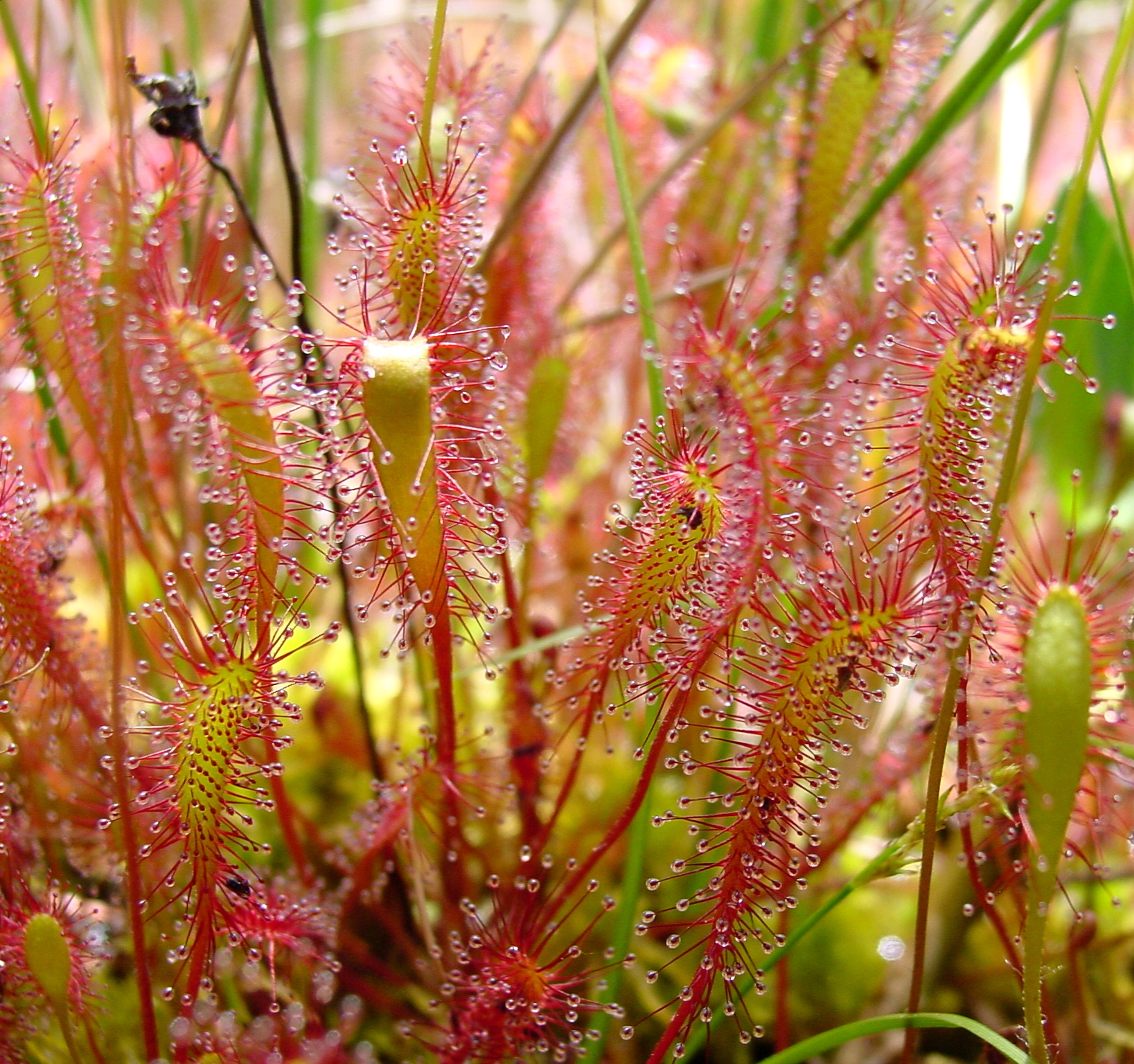
A species of Drosera with its sticky leaves that trap many ants

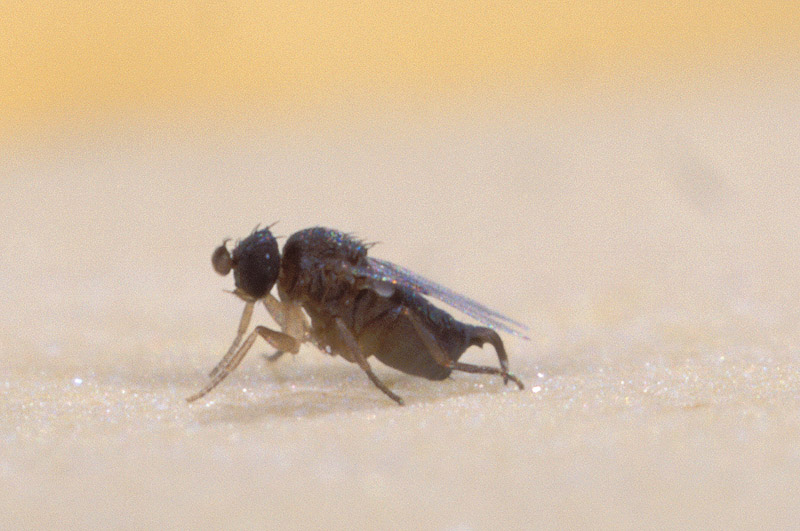
Pseudacteon curvatus, phorid fly parasitoid of fire ants

Phorid flies, or Phoridae, are a large family of small, hump-backed flies somewhat smaller than vinegar flies. Two species in this family (Pseudacteon tricuspis and Pseudacteon curvatus) are parasitoids of the red imported fire ant in its native range in South America. Some 110 species of the genus Pseudacteon, or ant-decapitating flies, have been described. Members of Pseudacteon reproduce by laying eggs in the thorax of the ant. The first instar larvae migrates to the head, then develops by feeding on the hemolymph, muscle tissue, and nervous tissue. After about two weeks, they cause the ant's head to fall off by releasing an enzyme that dissolves the membrane attaching the ant's head to its body. The fly pupates in the detached head capsule, emerging two weeks later.

Pseudacteon flies appear to be important ecological constraints on Solenopsis species and they have been introduced throughout the southern United States, starting with Travis, Brazos, and Dallas counties in Texas, as well as south central Alabama, where the ants first entered North America.

The Venus flytrap, a carnivorous plant, is native only to North and South Carolina in the United States. About 33% of the prey of the Venus flytrap are ants of various species. They lure their prey with a sweet sap. Once the prey has entered the trap and within about three seconds of touching two or three "trigger hairs" on the surface of the trap, the leaf closes around the prey and digests it. The majority of ants that are captured include non-native RIFAs, and three other species of ants. Other carnivorous plants, such as sundews (Drosera) and various kinds of pitcher plants also trap many ants.

Key natural enemies of fire ants also include other ant species which will attack prospective queens during the nest founding period, when there is an absence of workers to defend the emergent colony. Frequent competitors of fire ant founding queens include other Solenopsis thief ant species, and some invasive pest species, such as the tawny crazy ant, and the black crazy ant.

A number of entomopathogenic fungi are also natural enemies of fire ants, such as Beauveria bassiana and Metarhizium anisopliae. The latter is commercially available for the biological control (as an alternative to conventional pesticides) of various pest insects, and a new proposed technology has increased its shelf life and efficiency against fire ants.

== Species ==
The genus Solenopsis contains over 200 species. Not all species included in the genus are known as fire ants, but most are small slow-moving ants which are unable to sting, called thief ants. "True" fire ants are but a group of about 20 species of Solenopsis which are larger, and will viciously sting in swarms whenever disturbed. Some of the most studied species include:

- Solenopsis invicta Buren, 1972
- Solenopsis richteri Forel, 1909
- Solenopsis geminata (Fabricius, 1804)
- Solenopsis saevissima (Smith, 1855)
- Solenopsis silvestrii Emery, 1906
- Solenopsis solenopsidis (Kusnezov, 1953)
- Solenopsis xyloni McCook, 1879

== See also ==
- Ant venom
- Ants of medical importance
- Bullet ant
- Bulldog ant
- Red imported fire ants in Australia
