= Martineziana =

Scientific classification
- Kingdom: Animalia
- Phylum: Arthropoda
- Clade: Pancrustacea
- Class: Insecta
- Order: Coleoptera
- Suborder: Polyphaga
- Infraorder: Scarabaeiformia
- Family: Scarabaeidae
- Tribe: Eupariini
- Genus: Martineziana; Chalumeau & Ozdikmen, 2006

Synonyms
- Martineziella Chalumeau, 1986; Martinezia Chalumeau, 1983

Genus of beetles

Martineziana is a genus of aphodiine dung beetles in the family Scarabaeidae. There are about six described species in Martineziana.

== Species ==
These six species belong to the genus Martineziana:

- Martineziana argentina (Harold, 1867)
- Martineziana dutertrei (Chalumeau, 1983)
- Martineziana excavaticollis (Blanchard, 1846)
- Martineziana separata (Schmidt, 1909)
- Martineziana simplex (Balthasar, 1963)
- Martineziana vandykei (Hinton, 1936)
