= Martineziana excavaticollis =

Scientific classification
- Kingdom: Animalia
- Phylum: Arthropoda
- Clade: Pancrustacea
- Class: Insecta
- Order: Coleoptera
- Suborder: Polyphaga
- Infraorder: Scarabaeiformia
- Family: Scarabaeidae
- Genus: Martineziana
- Species: M. excavaticollis

Binomial name
- Martineziana excavaticollis (Blanchard, 1845)

Synonyms
- Oxyomus excavaticollis Blanchard, 1845

Species of beetle

Martineziana excavaticollis is a species of beetle of the family Scarabaeidae. It is found in Argentina, Bolivia, Brazil (Acre, Distrito Federal, Mato Grosso), Paraguay, Mexico (Nayarit) and the United States (Texas).

== Description ==
Adults reach a length of about 6 mm (0.24 in). The body is broad and dark brown. The head has transverse wrinkles and is medially gibbous. The pronotum is transverse and has punctures of two sizes: the fine punctures are inconspicuous among the extremely large punctures. The elytra are short and broad and the interstriae are microreticulate with inconspicuous punctures.
