= Martineziana separata =

Scientific classification
- Kingdom: Animalia
- Phylum: Arthropoda
- Clade: Pancrustacea
- Class: Insecta
- Order: Coleoptera
- Suborder: Polyphaga
- Infraorder: Scarabaeiformia
- Family: Scarabaeidae
- Genus: Martineziana
- Species: M. separata

Binomial name
- Martineziana separata (Schmidt, 1909)

Synonyms
- Euparia separata Schmidt, 1909

Species of beetle

Martineziana separata is a species of beetle of the family Scarabaeidae. It is found in Argentina, Brazil (Mato Grosso) and Paraguay.

== Description ==
Adults reach a length of about 5 mm (0.20 in). The body is piceous and the head and pronotum are covered with fine setae. The pronotum has punctures of two sizes: moderate, setaceous punctures mixed with wide coarse areolate punctures. The elytra have deep striae and the interstriae are convex, with rows of punctures on each side.
