= Martineziana simplex =

Scientific classification
- Kingdom: Animalia
- Phylum: Arthropoda
- Clade: Pancrustacea
- Class: Insecta
- Order: Coleoptera
- Suborder: Polyphaga
- Infraorder: Scarabaeiformia
- Family: Scarabaeidae
- Genus: Martineziana
- Species: M. simplex

Binomial name
- Martineziana simplex (Balthasar, 1963)

Synonyms
- Euparia simplex Balthasar, 1963; Martinezia cambeforti Chalumeau, 1983

Species of beetle

Martineziana simplex is a species of beetle of the family Scarabaeidae. It is found in Argentina, Bolivia, Brazil (Amazonas, Distrito Federal, Mato Grosso, Mato Grosso do Sul, Pará, Piauí), French Guiana, Paraguay, Uruguay and Venezuela.

== Description ==
Adults reach a length of about 4.3–4.6 mm (0.17–0.18 in). The body is dark reddish brown. The head has weak or indistinct transverse wrinkles and the pronotum has punctures of two sizes: the fine punctures are densely distributed everywhere, while the coarser punctures are scarce near the anterior margin, but abundant near the lateral and posterior margins. The elytra are wider posteriorly.

== Life history ==
Specimens have been collected from Urochloa decumbens pastures.
