= Solenopsis solenopsidis =

Conservation status
- Vulnerable (IUCN 2.3)

Scientific classification
- Kingdom: Animalia
- Phylum: Arthropoda
- Class: Insecta
- Order: Hymenoptera
- Family: Formicidae
- Subfamily: Myrmicinae
- Genus: Solenopsis
- Species: S. solenopsidis

Binomial name
- Solenopsis solenopsidis (Kusnezov, 1953)

Species of ant

Solenopsis solenopsidis is a species of ant in the genus Solenopsis. It is endemic to Argentina.
