= Solenopsis silvestrii =

Scientific classification
- Domain: Eukaryota
- Kingdom: Animalia
- Phylum: Arthropoda
- Class: Insecta
- Order: Hymenoptera
- Family: Formicidae
- Subfamily: Myrmicinae
- Genus: Solenopsis
- Species: S. silvestrii

Binomial name
- Solenopsis silvestrii Emery, 1906

Species of ant

Solenopsis silvestrii is a fire ant species in the family Formicidae.
