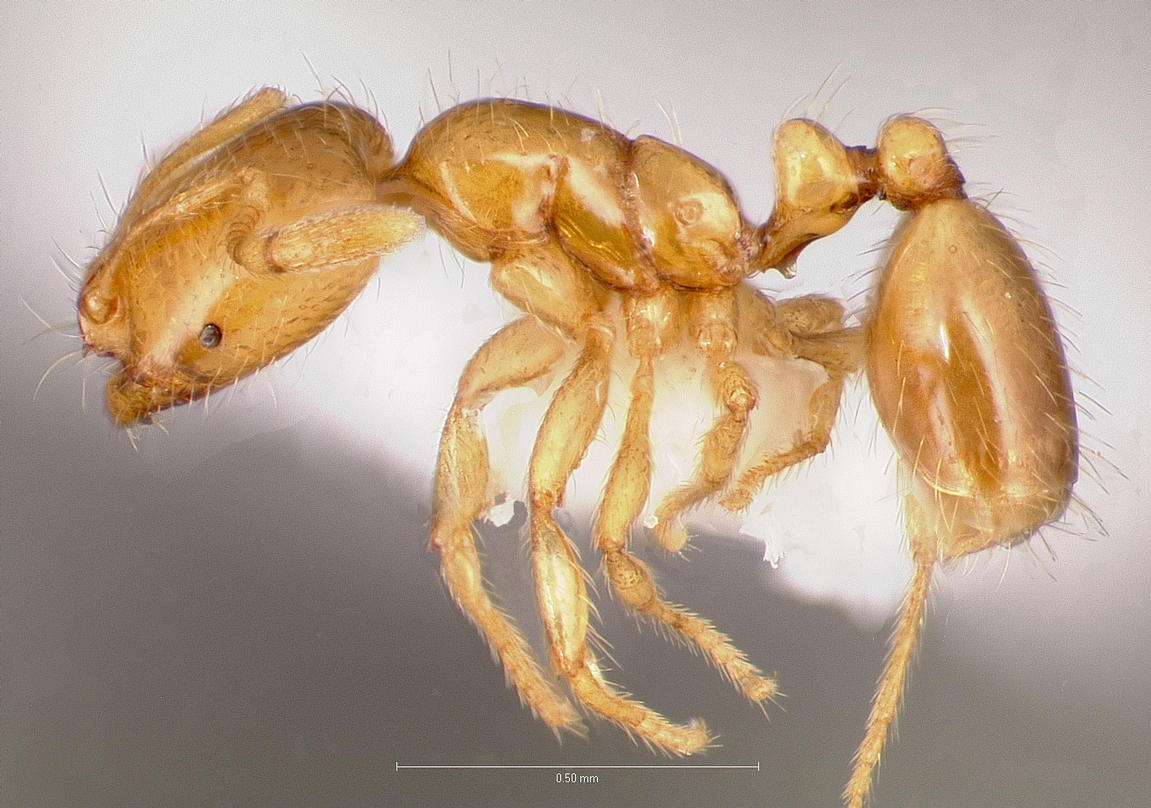
- Solenopsis molesta worker

Scientific classification
- Kingdom: Animalia
- Phylum: Arthropoda
- Clade: Pancrustacea
- Class: Insecta
- Order: Hymenoptera
- Family: Formicidae
- Subfamily: Myrmicinae
- Tribe: Solenopsidini
- Genus: Solenopsis
- Species: S. molesta

Binomial name
- Solenopsis molesta (Say, 1836)

= Solenopsis molesta =

Species of ant

Solenopsis molesta is the best known species of Solenopsis thief ants. They get their names from their habit of nesting close to other ant nests, from which they steal food. They are also called grease ants because they are attracted to grease. Nuptial flight in this species occur from late July through early fall.

== Appearance ==
S. molesta range anywhere from 1/32 of an inch (0.5 mm) to 1/8 of an inch (3 mm) long. Queens in this species measure at just over 5mm in length and range from a yellow to a light brown color. Workers are yellow and occasionally pale brown in appearance. They have very small eyes and are covered in erect and sub-erect yellow hairs. These ants have a two-segmented petiole (a petiole and postpetiole) connecting their abdomen to the thorax.

They have 10 segments in their antennae, which end in large segmented clubs. Thief ants possess small stingers on their oblong abdomens. Worker ants have large jaws for carrying food, usually other ants' brood, back to the colony. The larvae of thief ants have been described from the Brazilian species Solenopsis helena. Despite a general resemblance to the larvae of the larger fire ants, the larvae of thief ants are much smaller and present spiculate hairs on their face.

== Distribution ==
S. molesta are native to the United States and can be found in Eastern, Western, and Central parts of the country and northern Mexico.

== Habitat ==
The habitat of Solenopsis molesta is vast, because they can survive just about anywhere. They can live in people's homes, in the cracks or under the floorboards.

They can build nests anywhere, but usually near the nests of other species they steal from. They usually nest under rocks, in any exposed soil, or rotting logs. If they cannot find any of these things, then they move into another colony. Their nests are generally large for the ants’ size, and have tunnels that lead to another ant colony for a reliable and steady food source.

== Behavior ==
Colonies of S. molesta usually have anywhere from a few hundred to a few thousand workers. Colonies are occasionally polygynous, with a maximum of eight queens in a single nest. The number of thief ants in a colony depends on the location. Colonies with a reliable and ready food source do not have as many workers because food is readily available. Since ants of this species are so small, they can colonize just about anywhere. They can live in people's homes without them ever knowing that they have an infestation of tiny ants.

Solenopsis molesta are common in homes, and due to their small size they can easily enter sealed packages of food. Other thief ant colonies are inside other ant colonies. They then eat the food and sometimes larva of the host ants. They will eat just about anything, including dead animals and fungal spores, and will travel great distances in search for food. Once food has been found, a trail is formed from the colony to the food so the other thief ant workers can find it.

== Mating ==
S. molesta queens are bigger than the workers, being four to five millimeters long. Mating takes place from late July to early fall. Both the queens and S. molesta drones have wings, and mating takes place while flying. Queens sometimes fly with a worker or two clinging to their bodies, presumably to help out right away when the queen finds a suitable place for a colony. Queens can lay anywhere from 27 and 387 eggs per day, but the average number of eggs laid per day is 105. It takes about 52 days for an egg to become a fully mobile worker. Young Solenopsis molesta spends about 21 days in the larval stage when the weather is suitable.

== Diet ==
They eat grease whenever they find it, which is why they are sometimes called grease ants. They also eat meat, cheese and other dairy products, and seeds. They also eat larvae and pupae of other ant species and other insects such as codling moths. Thief ants do not appear to be attracted to sweets, unlike most other ants. However, they will consume some fruits and sugary soft drinks.

== Pest ==
Solenopsis molesta can be troublesome when they get into human dwellings. It is extremely hard to find these ants, due to their inaccessible and remote nesting areas and their extremely small size. They are also not always present outside their colony, and travel far to find food. Also, they are so small they can get into things that other insects cannot get into. The easiest way to locate a colony is to look for trails of ants. It is also hard to get rid of a S. molesta infestation because they are not attracted to common ant traps.

One of the most common ways to get rid of the ants is to put oil or grease in the middle of the ant trap. However, this is a hit-or-miss method, because too little grease will not attract the ants, and too much will limit the effectiveness of the trap. The ants also appear to be resistant to most insecticides. Solenopsis molesta are sometimes mistaken for the pharaoh ant, because there are similarities between the two. They are both around the same size, but there are differences in their markings.
