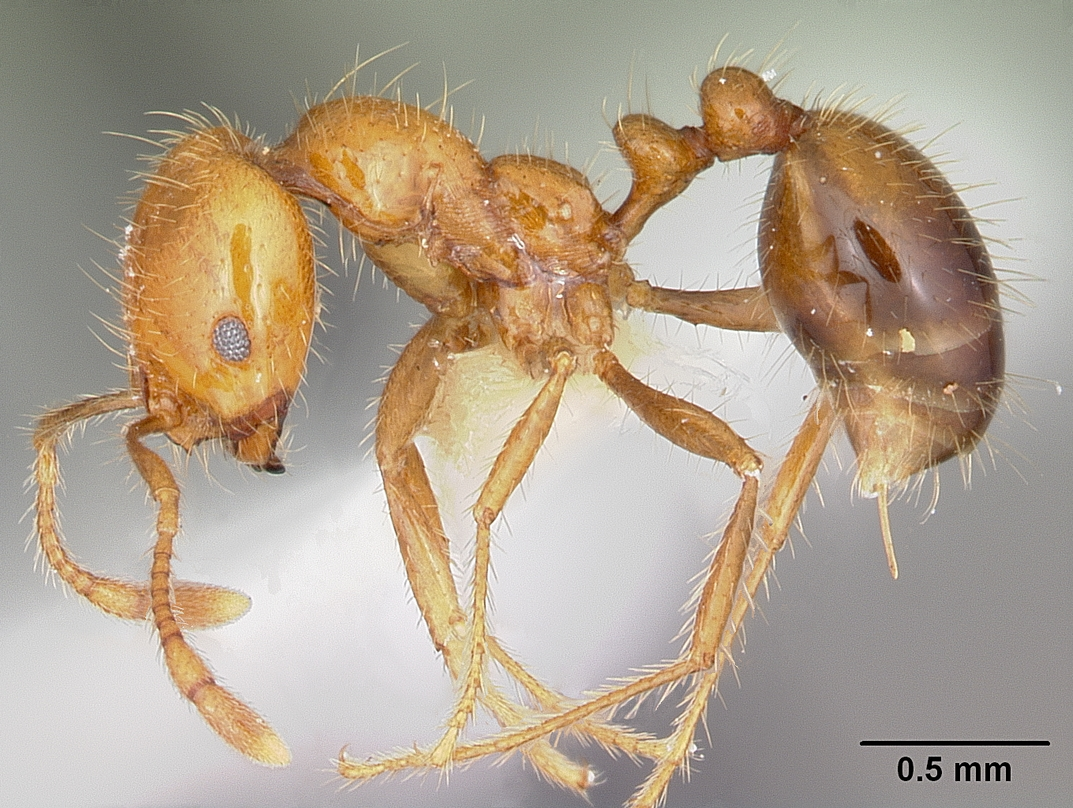

Scientific classification
- Kingdom: Animalia
- Phylum: Arthropoda
- Clade: Pancrustacea
- Class: Insecta
- Order: Hymenoptera
- Family: Formicidae
- Subfamily: Myrmicinae
- Tribe: Solenopsidini
- Genus: Solenopsis
- Species: S. geminata

Binomial name
- Solenopsis geminata (Fabricius, 1804)

Synonyms
- Atta geminata Fabricius, 1804

= Solenopsis geminata =

Species of fire ant

Solenopsis geminata or tropical fire ant is a species of fire ants, described by Fabricius in 1804, in the tribe Solenopsidini; it was originally placed in the Atta genus. This species has a pan-tropical distribution.

== Distribution ==
Solenopsis geminata is native to Northern, Central and South America, including the Caribbean islands, but has since spread throughout the tropics by human means. It is an invasive species with a world-wide distribution even greater than that of other invasive fire ant species such as Solenopsis invicta (red imported fire ant).

== Colonies and reproduction ==
S. geminata build their nests primarily in the soil in open, sunny areas. The nests are formed, some as craters or mounds, up to 2 feet wide and 12 inches tall with multiple entrance holes up to some 20 per nest. The number of mounds varies greatly, from 10 to 80 per acre in native habitats to up to 1000 or even 1500 mounds per acre in areas where they are introduced.

The colonies can either be monogyne, containing a single queen, or polygyne, containing many reproductive queens. They are known to hybridize with other closely related fire ant species. Queens may start a new colony following a nuptial flight. Otherwise, like other fire ants, they are known to spread by floating. Globally they can expand over long distances by jump-dispersal through human-mediated transport and invade new areas.

== Venom ==
The venom of S. geminata is comparable in power and dangerousness to the one of Solenopsis invicta, and can cause severe allergic reactions, especially anaphylactic shock, capable of threatening human survival. The lipophilic alkaloid solenopsin is a major constituent of its venom.

== Subspecies ==
The Global Biodiversity Information Facility includes:

1. Solenopsis geminata subsp. geminata (Fabricius, 1804)
2. Solenopsis geminata subsp. micans Stitz, 1912
3. Solenopsis geminata subsp. rufa (Fabricius, 1804)
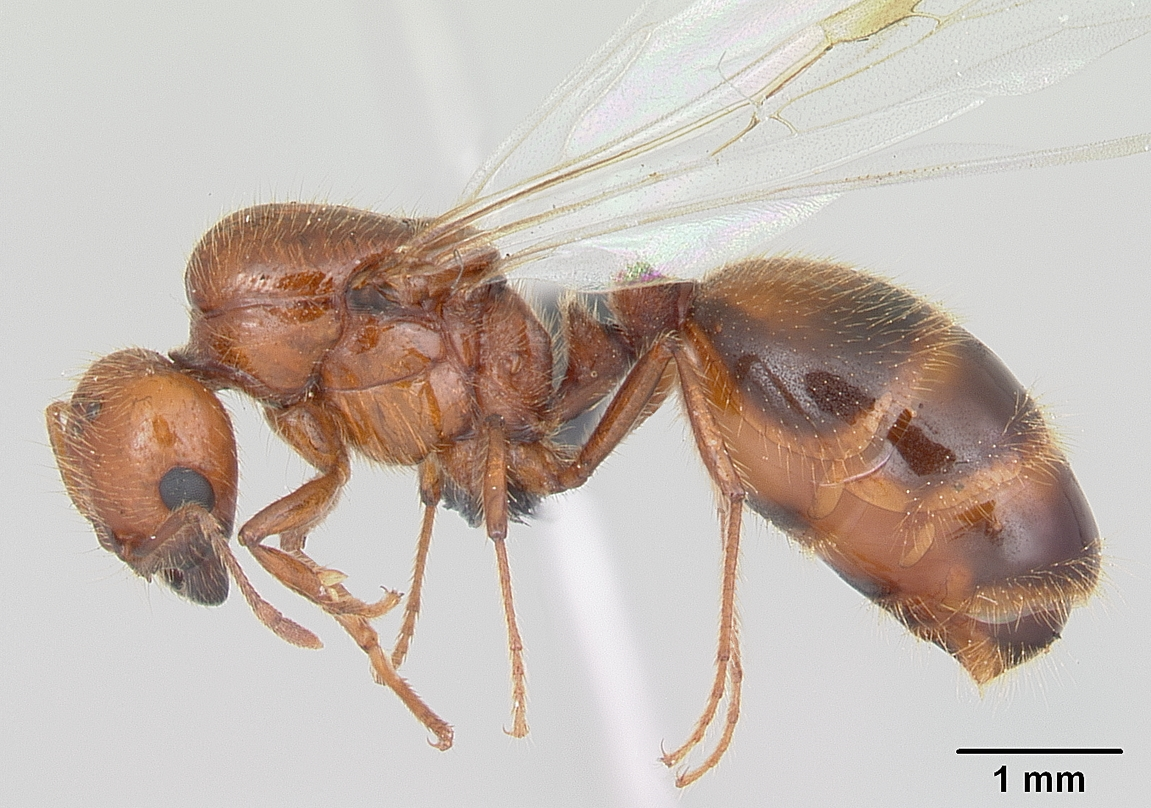
Queen

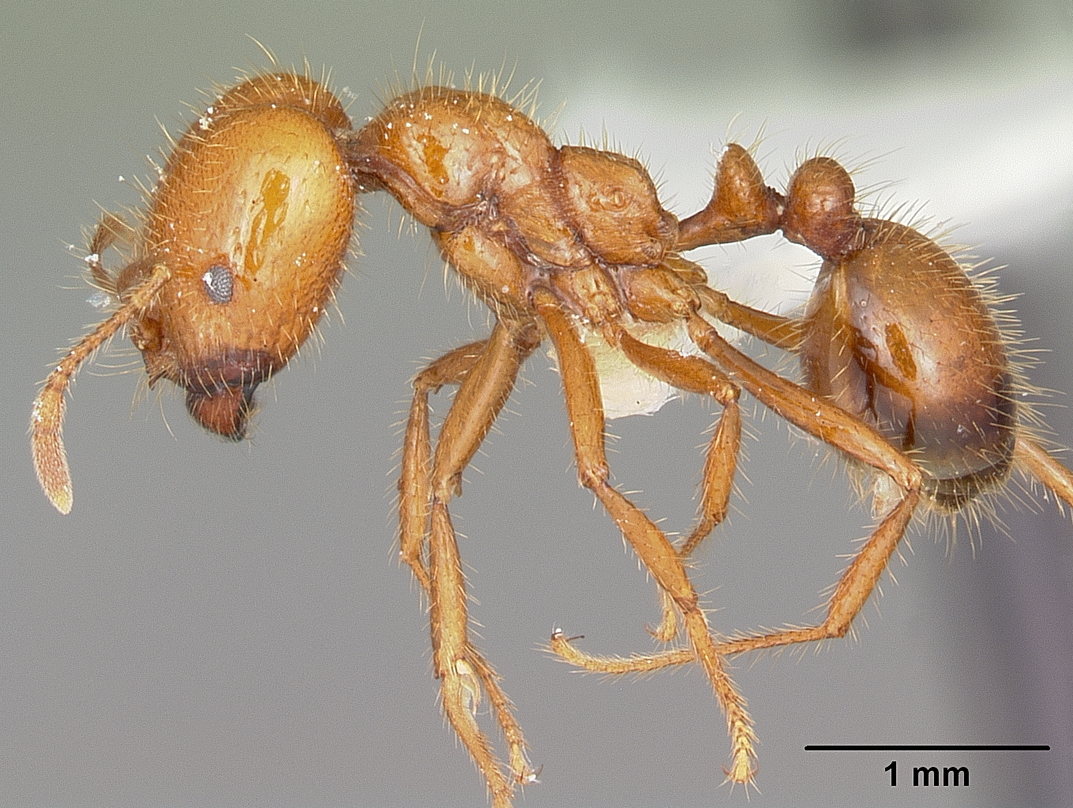
Worker

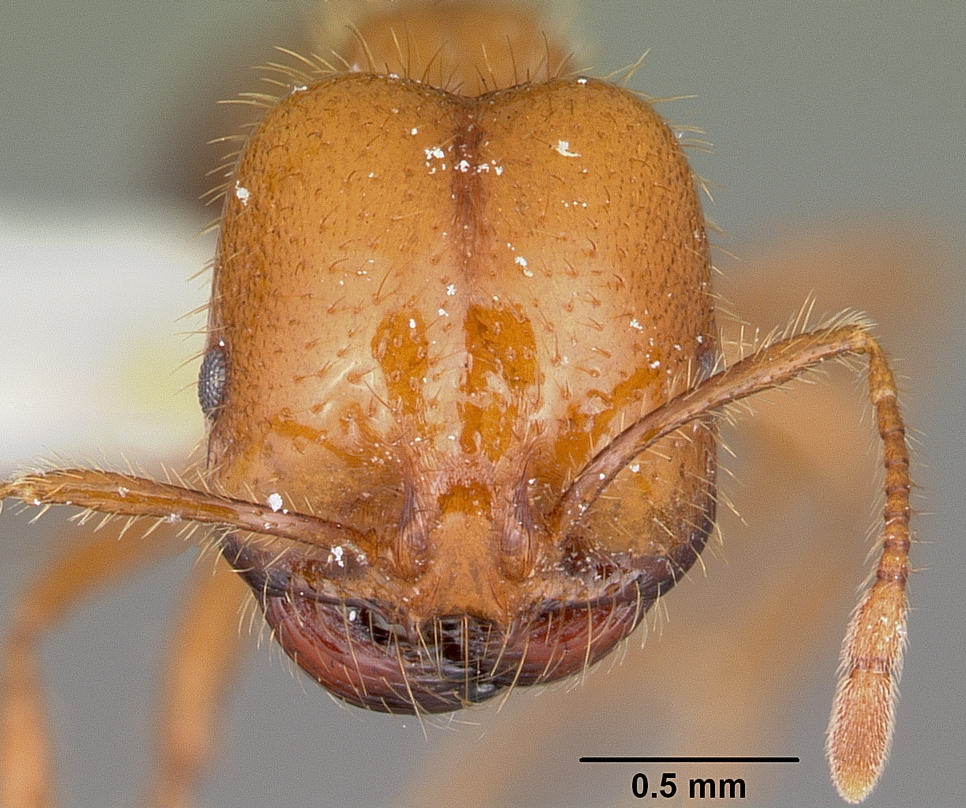
Head

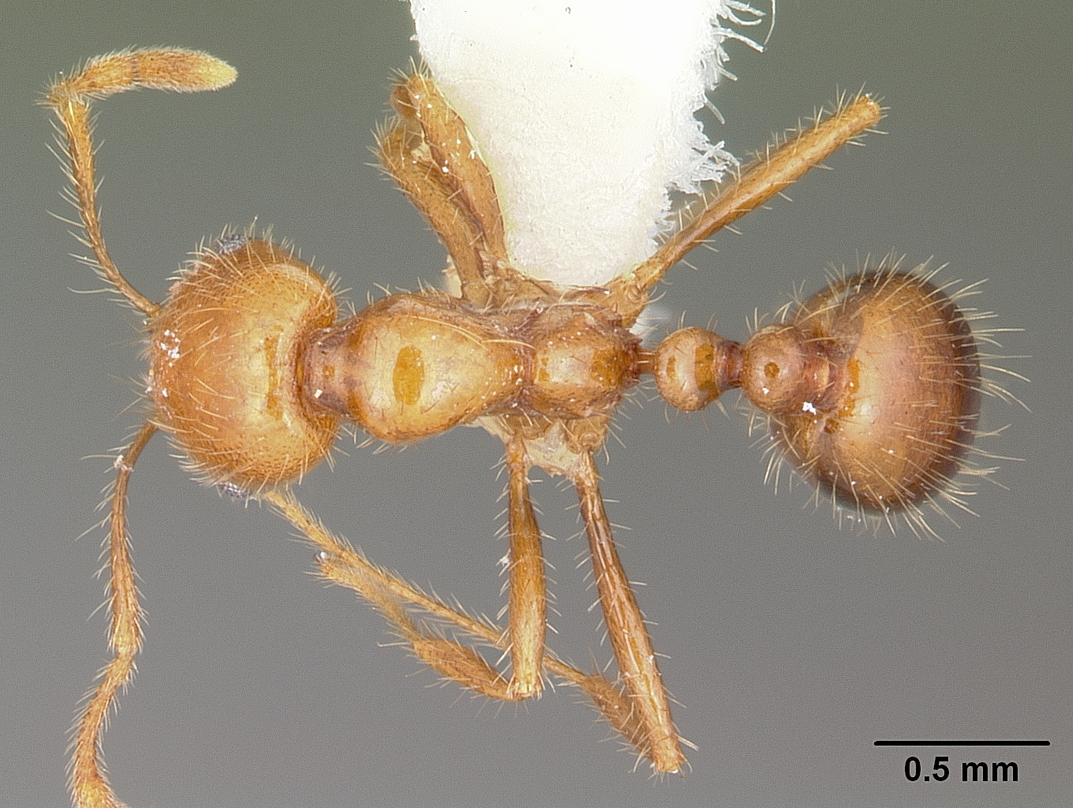
Dorsal view

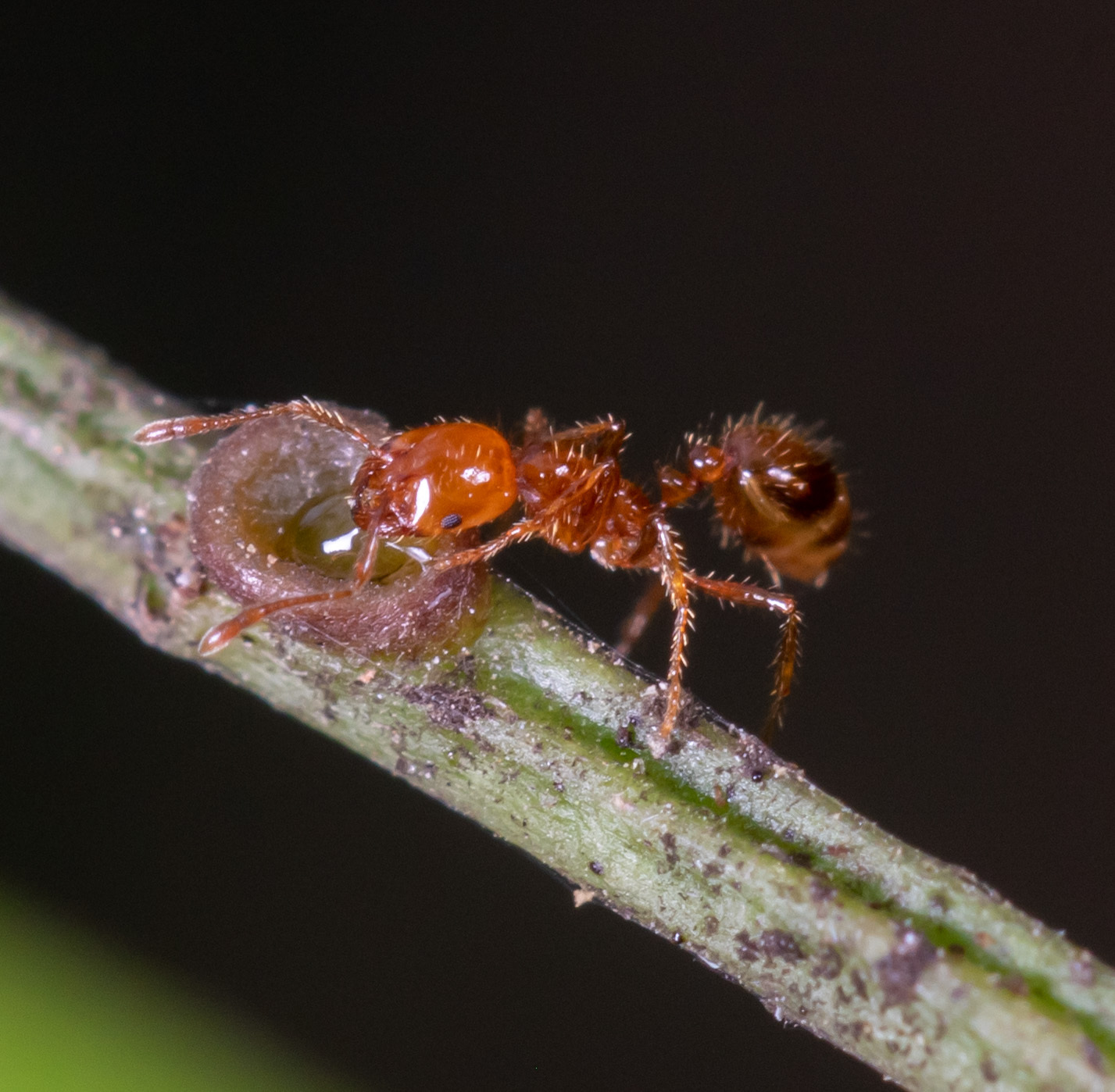
Worker drinking nectar
