= Toxicology of red imported fire ant venom =

Overview of toxicology of imported fire ant venom

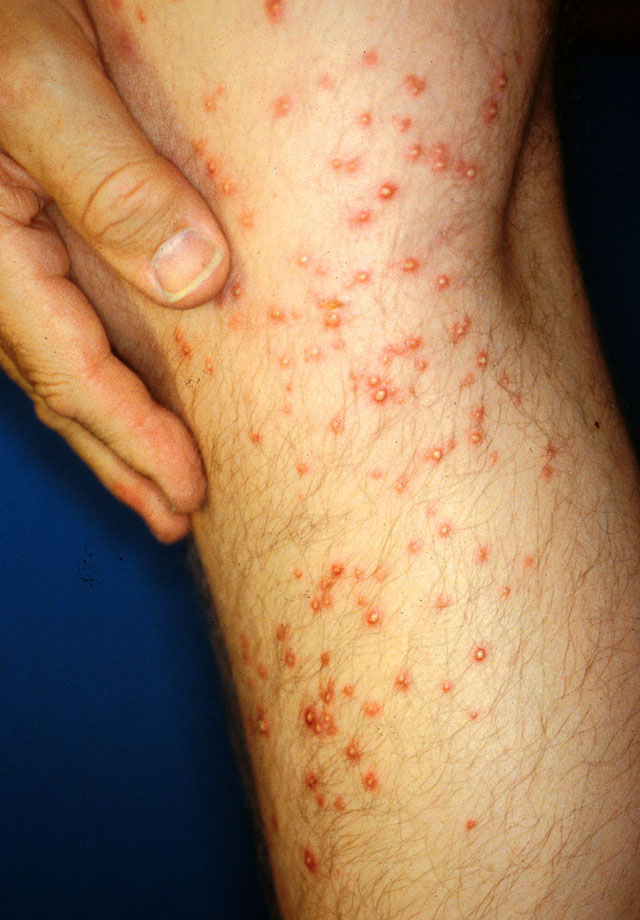
Formation of pustules on a human leg

The toxicology of fire ant venom is relatively well studied. The venom plays a central role in the biology of Red imported fire ants, such as in capturing prey, and in defending itself from competitors, assailants, and diseases. Some 14 million people are stung annually in the United States, suffering reactions that vary from mild discomfort, to pustule formation, swelling, and in rare cases, systemic reactions followed by anaphylactic shock. Fire ant venoms are mainly composed (>95%) of a complex mixture of insoluble alkaloids added to a watery solution of toxic proteins. For the Red imported fire ant Solenopsis invicta Buren there are currently 46 described proteins, of which four are well-characterised as potent allergens.

== Venom ==
Solenopsin, one of the components of the venom

Venom plays an important role in the biology of fire ants, being used to capture prey items, nest defense, and antimicrobial action. On average, however, a worker stores very little venom (only about 0.5 μg at any given time). Newborn workers contain little to no venom within their reservoirs, but workers that are only one day old can produce 1.17 μg/day. However, workers that are 17 days old only produce 0.3 μg/day. Workers deliver 0.66 nl of venom when they sting, which amounts to 3.1% of their supply. Older workers deliver less venom when they sting, but middle-aged workers and nest-defenders deliver much higher quantities. Like all fire ant species, venom is secreted by the venom gland and is stored in the poison sac. When in use, it is ejected through the stinger's main duct. Capacity is between 20 and 40 nl, but this depends on the worker's size. The American entomologist Justin O. Schmidt described it as being "sharp, sudden, mildly alarming", therefore ranking at "1" in the Schmidt sting pain index, a pain scale which ranks the pain intensity of an insect's sting from 0 to 4.

Over 95% of the venom components are water-insoluble piperidine alkaloids. Piperidines include trans-2-methyl-6-n-undecylpiperidines, trans-2-methyl-6-n-tridecylpiperidine, trans-2-methyl-6-(cis-4-tridecenyl) piperidines, trans-2-methyl-6-n-pentadecylpiperidine, trans-2-methyl-6-(cis-6-pentadecenyl)piperidine and 2,6-dialkylpiperidines (the ants' venom is dominated by the trans- stereoisomers of this specific ingredient). trans-2-Methyl-6-n-undecylpiperidine (solenopsin) has been shown to have cytotoxic, hemolytic, necrotic, insecticidal, antibacterial, antifungal, and anti-HIV properties. As well as that, the alkaloid has shown antiangiogenic activity. These components are responsible for the formation of hives, and also for the development of sterile pustules on areas where the ant has stung. Experiments indicate that the median lethal dose (LD_{50}) on tested female rats is 0.36 mg/kg.

Approximately 46 proteins have been identified in the red imported fire ant's venom, although scientists have long believed the venom only contained alkaloids. This assumption was mostly due to the difficulties in obtaining sufficient venom for analysis because of its low protein content, which is only 0.1% of the venom's total weight.

These proteins are experimentally suggested to directly account for the anaphylactic reactions seen in humans sensitive to the venom. Whilst including a number of neurotoxins and potential allergens, not all of these proteins are involved with venom function. At least four protein allergens have been characterised, named Sol i 1–4. Of these, Sol i 3, is part of the antigen 5 family, and Sol i 1 is a phospholipase A1B; Sol i 1 shows a close relation with wasp venom phospholipases. Sol i 2 and 4 are unique, odorant-binding proteins of poorly understood function. Other proteins found in the venom may benefit the colony; some of these proteins can kill off bacteria, which may explain why workers spray venom around their nests by vibrating their gasters. Other proteins also bind pheromones which may assist a worker to lay chemical trails to communicate with other nestmates.

== Incidence ==
In the United States, more than 40 million people live in areas infested with fire ant populations and 14 million people are stung by them annually. A quarter of all victims stung by red imported fire ants are expected to develop sensitivity to the venom, and approximately 6,000 will suffer anaphylaxis. 51% of people who relocated themselves to infested areas report getting stung within three weeks after arrival. In a survey conducted in South Carolina, 33,000 people (or 94 per 10,000 population) received medical attention due to red imported fire ants, and 660 people (1.9 per 10 000 population) were treated for anaphylaxis. In Texas, 79% of participants in a survey stated they had been stung by red imported fire ants, while 20% had not. 61% of West Texans state they had been stung by the ants before, compared to 90% in central Texas, 89% in east Texas, 86% in the gulf coastal regions, 78% in the south and 72% in the north. In separate survey, 87% of individuals classed their reactions as mild, 12% as moderate and 1% as severe. In Australia, 64,000 homes are within red imported fire ant infested areas, and 140,000 consultations and 3,000 anaphylactic reaction cases are predicted every year by 2030 if government efforts to eradicate the ant fail. A survey conducted in China shows that one-third of participants in infested areas were victims of red imported fire ant stings.

Studies suggest that the rate of systemic reactions to stings may be associated with seasonal variations in the venom's potency. 51% of allergic reactions occurred in summer, and 19% in spring. However, A survey reported a higher incidence during spring (39.9%) than summer (31.9%). Younger people, usually those under 20 years, experience the highest rate of sting attacks (50%), but the rate declines with older people. Among men and women, the rate varies as some studies report more women being attacked than men and vice versa. Deaths from red imported fire ant stings are rare, but may become common the more the ant spreads. Many cases have also been reported in the past. It is reported that more than 80 deaths have been recorded; of these, 22 cases were recorded in Florida and 19 in Texas. However, when duplicate reports are excluded, four deaths were recorded in Alabama, 10 in Florida, two in Georgia and Louisiana, and 14 in Texas. People can be educated and be made aware of the dangers of red imported fire ants.

== Signs and symptoms ==
Reactions seen in humans vary; some are hypersensitive to venom while others show resilience. Hypersensitivity can be attributed to certain medical problems such as heart conditions or diabetes. Bacterial infections attributed to sting injuries also pose a problem and may require further medical attention. Most humans can withstand many stings, but others may suffer from severe reactions such as anaphylaxis.

People who are stung by red imported fire ants may experience intense local burning or flare-ups, followed by reddening of the skin at the sting site. This area will swell into a bump, hive or vesicle within 20 minutes. White fluid-filled sterile pustules begin to form within hours or days after being stung. Pustules on the skin remain for a couple of days, and may become infected which would require medical attention. In most cases, pustules dry up in a matter of weeks and leave brown scars that either remain for several months or become permanent. The formation of pustules occurs in almost every person stung by the ants. In one study, 96% of participants reported the formation of pustules, whereas 2% reported large local reactions. Between 17% and 56% of people stung develop venom-specific IgE. Many of them will experience pruritic lumps around areas where the ants stung, known as late-phase responses or cutaneous allergic reactions.

Pustule formation can only be prevented if the ants are removed before they have a chance to sting. Once venom has been injected, pustules will form and no form of treatment will prevent them from occurring. Medications such as antibiotics, diphenylhydrazines, epinephrines or topical steroids will not affect pustular reactions.

Anaphylaxis occurs in 0.6 to 6% of people who have been stung by the ants, and it can be fatal if left untreated. Typical symptoms of anaphylaxis include dizziness, headaches, fever, severe chest pain, nausea, severe sweating, low blood pressure, loss of breath, serious swelling, and slurred speech. One case reports a victim feeling strong vertigo 5 to 10 minutes after being stung, followed by glassy eyes, dry mouth, paleness, unconsciousness and severe cramps on the sting sites. In addition, neuropathy, seizures (even without any evidence of prior systemic reactions), cerebrovascular accidents, and nephrotic syndrome have been associated with red imported fire ant stings. A series of neurotoxins have been identified in red imported fire ant venom, which may explain why some victims experience hallucinations after they have been stung.

== Treatment ==
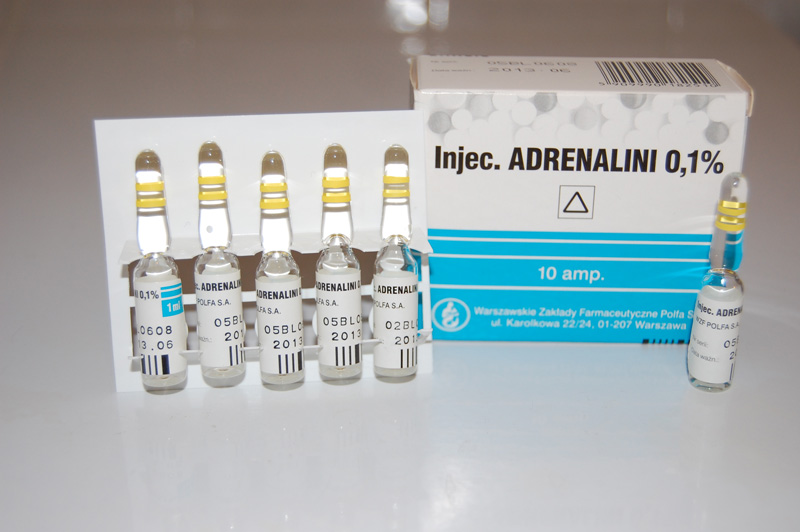
Adrenaline (also called epinephrine) can quickly reverse the adverse events of dyspnoea and hypotension

It is suggested that a conservative approach be used when treating sting injuries; specifically, the kind of treatment used should be based on the symptoms. For minor sting injuries, with symptoms only including pustule formations and pain, over-the-counter products are available to prevent infection. Ants should be removed by washing the area with antiseptic soap, and itchiness. It is rare for ant sting sites to become infected, so the use of antibiotic prophylaxis is not always required.

Victims who show signs of anaphylaxis are treated with antihistamines, epinephrines, and parenteral corticosteroids. Epinephrine is the first product for use to treat systemic allergic responses, particularly if a patient is experiencing dyspnoea or hypotension because it is capable of reversing adverse events quickly and is very safe to use. It is recommended that people who have suffered from anaphylaxis carry an epinephrine autoinjector (EpiPen), should dyspnoea or hypotension begin to occur.

Whole body extract immunotherapy (WBE) to treat victims of anaphylaxis has been in use since 1973. Anyone who has a suspected allergy to the venom is redirected to an allergist for assessment. The treatment uses the entire body of the ant and not just the venom, and unlike fire ant venom immunotherapy (which is occasionally used), WBE contains venom proteins. To reduce a patient's sensitivity to the venom, gradual increases of dose extracts are injected into the body. WBE immunotherapy appears to be very effective in preventing systemic reactions; in one study of participants who completed WBE immunotherapy, two out of fifteen participants suffered from allergic reactions upon being stung 18 months after immunotherapy. As mentioned, fire ant venom immunotherapy is occasionally used, and studies show it can reduce the risk of systemic reactions. In fact, another study claims that fire ant venom immunotherapy is more effective than WBE immunotherapy. Fire ant venom immunotherapy is not recommended for children with large local reactions, although an exception may be made for those who live in heavily infested areas. There is also an increased risk of systemic allergic reactions to future stings in children who have cutaneous manifestations after getting stung. This makes many experts put some children on fire ant venom immunotherapy, while others do not.

The recommended maintenance dose is between 0.5 mL of a 1:100 w/v 1:10 w/v WBE. For fire ant venom immunotherapy, the most common maintenance dose is 0.5 mL of a 1:200 (wt/vol) dilution. During the build-up phase, it is recommended that dosing is given weekly or biweekly, although some scientists suggest that rush protocols can be successful. It is recommended that patients going through immunotherapy receive treatment for three to five years, and lifelong therapy, although there is no consensus as to how long an individual should be treated.

== Stings to animals ==
The stings of the red imported fire ant in animals are painful, and may prove life-threatening. In dogs, stings from the red imported fire ant can cause pustular dermatosis, a condition where pustules appear in crops as a result of the ant sting. After getting stung, the immediate response consists of erythema and swelling. The pustules remain for approximately 24 hours, whereas in humans they can last for several days. In livestock, red imported ants mostly sting animals in regions with no hair, particularly around the ears, eyes, muzzle, the perineum and ventral portion of the abdomen. Newborn or young livestock can be blinded or killed when attacked by the ants. Healthy individuals are less likely to be attacked than weak or sick animals. Red papule and mild swelling occur, followed by vesicopustule with a red halo developing within 24 to 48 hours. The eyes and eyelids are commonly damaged from the stings; in sheep and goats, ophthalmic ointment containing antibiotics and corticosteroids can be used to treat the eyes of sheep and goats, but this treatment is not recommended for horses. In non-domestic animals, cases of red imported fire ants stings in animals such as ferrets, moles squirrels, white-tailed deer, cottontail rabbits, and newborn blackbucks have been reported, as well as lizards and screech owl nestlings. The aftermath of the injuries is like those in domestic animals.

Red imported fire ants are known to actively kill vertebrate animals, and cause significant livestock losses. Animals may trigger major stinging episodes when they disturb active nests, with thousands of ants participating in the attack. During such episodes, an animal may suffer from hundreds to thousands of individual stings. It is suspected that many victims of the red imported fire ants may be depressed as a result of the effects of the toxin. Some animals may swallow red imported fire ants as they lick or bite around the sites they are stinging. This can cause additional injuries inside the animal itself, especially in the upper gastrointestinal tract. In suckling white tail deer fawns, sting sites have been found in the oesophagus and abomasum; toxins from the ingested ants may cause inflammation of the gastrointestinal lining.

== Sources ==
- Adams, C.T. (1986). "Agricultural and medical impact of the imported fire ants". In Lofgren, C.S.; Vander Meer, R.K. (eds.). Fire Ants and Leaf-cutting Ants: Biology and Management. Boulder, Colorado: Westview Press. pp. 48–57. ISBN 978-0-8133-7071-2.
- Capinera, J.L. (2008). Encyclopedia of Entomology (2nd ed.). Dordrecht, Netherlands: Springer. ISBN 978-1-4020-6242-1.
- Fox, E.G.P. (2016). "Venom Toxins of Fire Ants". In Gopalakrishnakone, P.; Calvete, J. (eds.). Venom Genomics and Proteomics. Toxinology. Dordrecht, Netherlands: Springer. ISBN 978-9-4007-6415-6.
- Lockey, R.F.; Ledford, D.K. (2014). Allergens and Allergen Immunotherapy: Subcutaneous, Sublingual, and Oral (5th ed.). Boca Raton, Florida: CRC Press, Taylor & Francis Group. ISBN 978-1-84214-574-6.
- Schneiderman, P.; Grossman, M. (2006). A Clinician's Guide to Dermatologic Differential Diagnosis, Volume 1: The Text. New York: CRC Press. ISBN 978-0-203-09052-7.
- Taber, S.W. (2000). Fire Ants. College Station, Texas: Texas A&M University Press. ISBN 978-1-60344-711-9.
- Tschinkel, W. (2006). The Fire Ants. Cambridge, Massachusetts: Belknap Press of Harvard University Press. ISBN 978-0-674-02207-2.
