= Solenopsin =

Names
- Preferred IUPAC name (2R,6R)-2-Methyl-6-undecylpiperidine
- Other names Solenopsin A

Identifiers
CAS Number	137038-57-4
3D model (JSmol)	Interactive image
ChemSpider	65431
PubChem CID	72523
UNII	JMN4G8N49K
CompTox Dashboard (EPA)	DTXSID90903975
- InChI: InChI=1S/C17H35N/c1-3-4-5-6-7-8-9-10-11-14-17-15-12-13-16(2)18-17/h16-18H,3-15H2,1-2H3/t16-,17-/m1/s1 Key: AYJGABFBAYKWDX-IAGOWNOFSA-N
- SMILES: CCCCCCCCCCC[C@@H]1CCC[C@H](N1)C

Properties
Chemical formula	C_{17}H_{35}N
Molar mass	253.474 g·mol^{−1}
- Except where otherwise noted, data are given for materials in their standard state (at 25 °C [77 °F], 100 kPa). verify (what is ?) Infobox references

Solenopsin is a lipophilic alkaloid with the molecular formula C_{17}H_{35}N found in the venom of fire ants (Solenopsis). It is considered the primary toxin in the venom and may be the component responsible for the cardiorespiratory failure in people who experience excessive fire ant stings.

Structurally solenopsins are a piperidine ring with a methyl group substitution at position 2 and a long hydrophobic chain at position 6. They are typically oily at room temperature, water-insoluble, and present an absorbance peak at 232 nanometers. Fire ant venom contains other chemically related piperidines which make purification of solenopsin from ants difficult. Therefore, solenopsin and related compounds have been the target of organic synthesis from which pure compounds can be produced for individual study. Originally synthesized in 1993, several groups have designed novel and creative methods of synthesizing enantiopure solenopsin and other alkaloidal components of ant venom.

== Total synthesis ==
The total synthesis of solenopsin has been described by several methods. A proposed method of synthesis(Figure 1) starts with alkylation of 4-chloropyridine with a Grignard reagent derived from 1-bromoundecane, followed by reaction with phenyl chloroformate to form 4-chloro-1-(phenoxycarbonyl)-2-n-undecyl-1,2-dihydropyridine. The phenylcarbamate is converted to the BOC protecting group, and then pyridine is methylated at the 6 position. The pyridine ring is then reduced to a tetrahydropyridine via catalytic hydrogenation with Pd/C and then further reduced with sodium cyanoborohydride to a piperidine ring. The BOC group is finally removed to yield solenopsin. A number of analogs have been synthesized using modifications of this procedure.

A shorter method of synthesis stemming from commercially available lutidine has been more recently proposed.

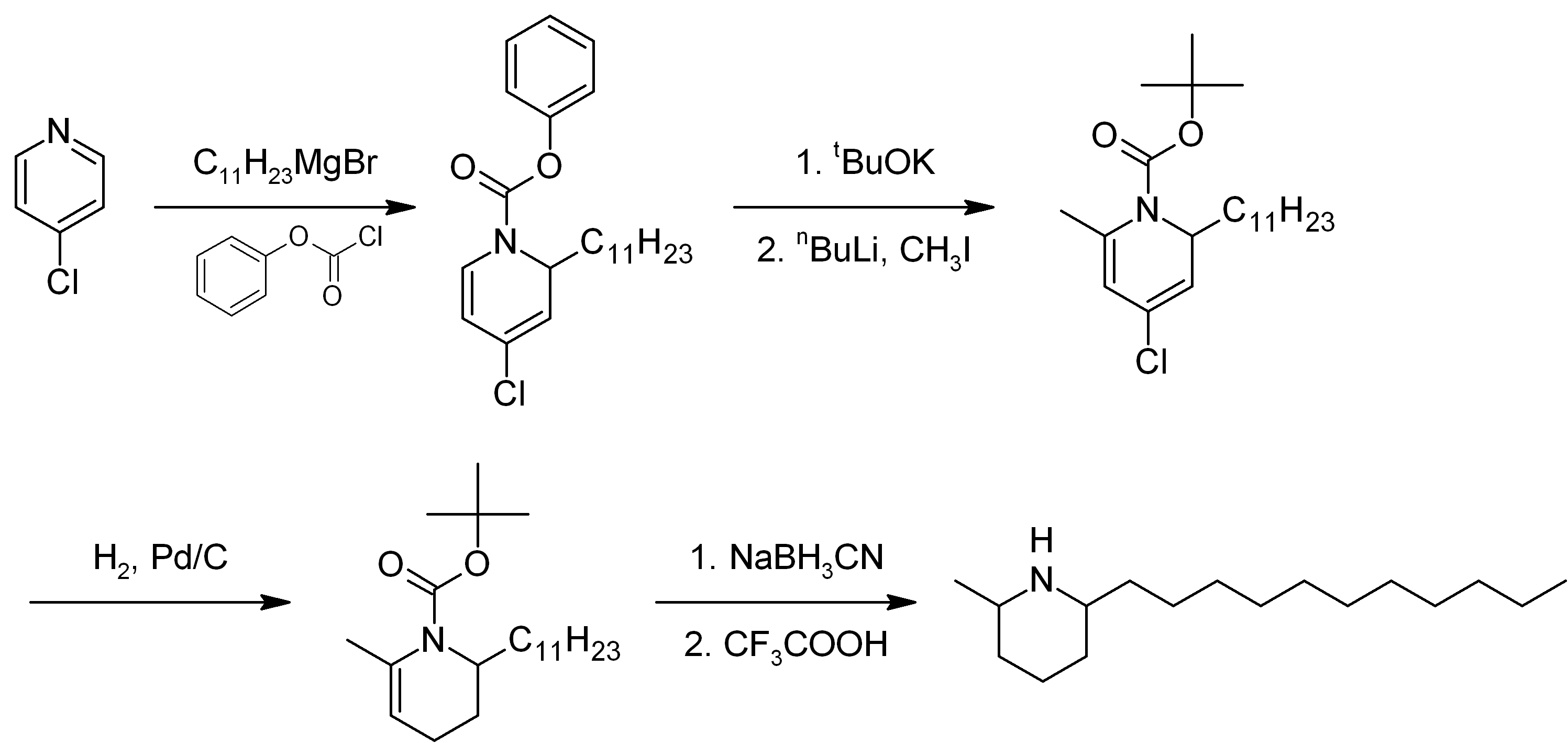
Figure 1. Example synthesis of racemic solenopsin

== Biological activities ==
Solenopsins are described as toxic against vertebrates and invertebrates. For example, the compound known as isosolenopsin A has been demonstrated to have strong insecticidal effects which may play a central role in the biology of fire ants.

In addition to its toxicity, solenopsis has a number of other biological activities. It inhibits angiogenesis in vitro via the phosphoinositide 3-kinase (PI3K) signaling pathway, inhibits neuronal nitric oxide synthase (nNOS) in a manner that appears to be non-competitive with L-arginine, and inhibits quorum-sensing signaling in some bacteria. The biological activities of solenopsins have led researchers to propose a number of biotechnological and biomedical applications for these compounds. For instance, mentioned anti-bacterial and interference in quorum-sensing signalling apparently provide solenopsins with considerable anti-biofilm activity, which suggests the potential of analogs as new disinfectants and surface-conditioning agents. Also, solenopsins have been demonstrated to inhibit cell division and viability of Trypanosoma cruzi, the cause of Chagas disease, which suggests these alkaloids as potential chemotherapeutic drugs.

Solenopsin and analogs share structural and biological properties with the sphingolipid ceramide, a major endogenous regulator of cell signaling, inducing mitophagy and anti-proliferative effects in different tumor cell lines.

Synthetic analogs of solenopsin are being studied for the potential treatment of psoriasis.
