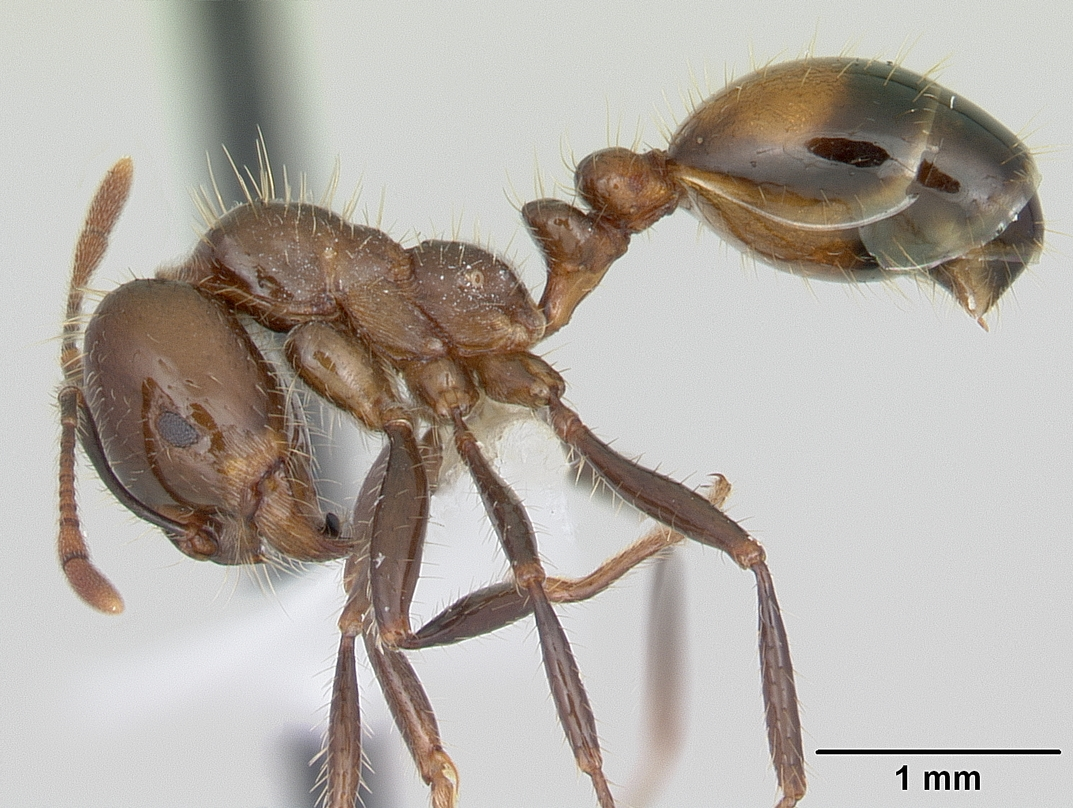
- Solenopsis richteri worker

Scientific classification
- Kingdom: Animalia
- Phylum: Arthropoda
- Clade: Pancrustacea
- Class: Insecta
- Order: Hymenoptera
- Family: Formicidae
- Subfamily: Myrmicinae
- Genus: Solenopsis
- Species: S. richteri

Binomial name
- Solenopsis richteri Buren, 1972
- The original natural range of Solenopsis richteri.

= Black imported fire ant =

Species of ant

The black imported fire ant (Solenopsis richteri), often abbreviated as BIFA, is a species of ant in the genus Solenopsis (fire ants). It was long thought to either be a subspecies or a color variation of Solenopsis invicta (the red imported fire ant, or simply RIFA), but is now recognized as its own species, with a demonstratively different range and living habits. BIFA seem to be more tolerant of cold, and a less dominant species than RIFA. The BIFA's higher body content of water than the RIFA might be related to their difference of living regions.

The species is native to South America, but has been introduced to North America. In the United States, the official assessment is that BIFA are limited to extreme northeastern Mississippi, northwestern Alabama and a few southern counties in Tennessee, though this may reflect underestimation of their range. As of April 2013 their range has been found as far north as the tidewater area of Virginia, and as of July 2016 they have been reported near coastal South Carolina. Since the 2013 records, this species has been collected in NE Arkansas in several Craighead County localities. These collections are presumably the result of recent landscaping of new construction projects.

All stings of imported fire ants will produce a sterile pustule that is helpful in distinguishing them from the stings or bites of other insects. Pustules are surrounded by reddened swelling (wheal) with the redness (erythema) extending beyond (flare). The extent of reaction to imported fire ant stings is variable depending on the quantity of allergic (IgE) antibodies an individual has already formed. There may also be differences in the venom from the two species that result in more pronounced wheal and flare formation after stings from BIFA.

== See also ==
- Kneallhazia solenopsae
