= List of Solenopsis species =

This is a list of valid species of the myrmicine genus Solenopsis (fire ants). There are over 200 species in this genus.

== Species ==
- Solenopsis abdita Thompson, 1989
- Solenopsis abjectior Pacheco & Mackay, 2013
- Solenopsis africana Santschi, 1914
- Solenopsis alecto Santschi, 1934
- †Solenopsis alena Özdikmen, 2010
- Solenopsis altinodis Forel, 1912
- Solenopsis amblychila Wheeler, 1915
- Solenopsis andina Santschi, 1923
- Solenopsis atlantis Santschi, 1934
- Solenopsis aurea Wheeler, 1906
- Solenopsis azteca Forel, 1893
- Solenopsis basalis Forel, 1895
- Solenopsis belisarius Forel, 1907
- Solenopsis bicolor Emery, 1906
- †Solenopsis blanda (Förster, 1891)
- Solenopsis brazoensis (Buckley, 1866)
- Solenopsis brevicornis Emery, 1888
- Solenopsis bruchiella Emery, 1922
- Solenopsis bruesi Creighton, 1930
- Solenopsis bucki Kempf, 1973
- Solenopsis canariensis Forel, 1893
- Solenopsis capensis Mayr, 1866
- Solenopsis carolinensis Forel, 1901
- Solenopsis castor Forel, 1893
- Solenopsis celata (Dlussky & Zabelin, 1985)
- Solenopsis clarki Crawley, 1922
- Solenopsis clytemnestra Emery, 1896
- Solenopsis conjurata Wheeler, 1925
- Solenopsis cooperi Donisthorpe, 1947
- Solenopsis corticalis Forel, 1881
- Solenopsis crivellarii Menozzi, 1936
- Solenopsis daguerrei (Santschi, 1930)
- Solenopsis dalli (Kusnezov, 1969)
- Solenopsis debilior Santschi, 1934
- Solenopsis decipiens Emery, 1906
- Solenopsis dentata Collingwood & Kugler, 1994
- Solenopsis desecheoensis Mann, 1920
- Solenopsis deserticola Ruzsky, 1905
- Solenopsis dysderces Snelling, 1975
- Solenopsis egregia (Kusnezov, 1953)
- Solenopsis electra Forel, 1914
- Solenopsis elhawagryi Sharaf & Aldawood, 2012
- Solenopsis emeryi Santschi, 1934
- Solenopsis emiliae Santschi, 1912
- Solenopsis enigmatica Deyrup & Prusak, 2008
- Solenopsis eximia (Kusnezov, 1953)
- Solenopsis fairchildi Wheeler, 1926
- †Solenopsis foersteri Théobald, 1937
- Solenopsis franki Forel, 1908
- Solenopsis froggatti Forel, 1913
- Solenopsis fugax (Latreille, 1798)
- Solenopsis fusciventris Clark, 1934
- Solenopsis gallica Santschi, 1934
- Solenopsis gayi (Spinola, 1851)
- Solenopsis geminata (Fabricius, 1804)
- Solenopsis gensterblumi Forel, 1901
- Solenopsis georgica Menozzi, 1942
- Solenopsis germaini Emery, 1895
- Solenopsis globularia (Smith, 1858)
- Solenopsis gnoma Pacheco, Herrera & MacKay, 2007
- Solenopsis gnomula Emery, 1915
- Solenopsis goeldii Forel, 1912
- Solenopsis granivora Kusnezov, 1957
- Solenopsis hayemi Forel, 1908
- Solenopsis helena Emery, 1895
- Solenopsis hostilis (Borgmeier, 1959)
- Solenopsis iheringi Forel, 1908
- Solenopsis ilinei Santschi, 1936
- Solenopsis impolita Moreno-Gonzalez, Mackay & Pacheco, 2013
- Solenopsis indagatrix Wheeler, 1928
- Solenopsis insculpta Clark, 1938
- Solenopsis insinuans Santschi, 1933
- Solenopsis interrupta Santschi, 1916
- Solenopsis invicta Buren, 1972
- Solenopsis isopilis Pacheco & Mackay, 2013
- Solenopsis jacoti Wheeler, 1923
- Solenopsis jalalabadica Pisarski, 1970
- Solenopsis japonica Wheeler, 1928
- Solenopsis joergenseni Santschi, 1919
- Solenopsis johnsoni Pacheco, Mackay & Moreno-Gonzalez, 2013
- Solenopsis juliae (Arakelian, 1991)
- Solenopsis kabylica Santschi, 1934
- Solenopsis knuti Pisarski, 1967
- Solenopsis kochi Finzi, 1936
- Solenopsis krockowi Wheeler, 1908
- Solenopsis laeviceps Mayr, 1870
- Solenopsis latastei Emery, 1895
- Solenopsis latro Forel, 1894
- Solenopsis leptanilloides Santschi, 1925
- Solenopsis longiceps Forel, 1907
- Solenopsis longinoi Pacheco & Mackay, 2013
- Solenopsis loretana Santschi, 1936
- Solenopsis lotophaga Santschi, 1911
- Solenopsis lou Forel, 1902
- Solenopsis lucayensis Wheeler, 1908
- Solenopsis lusitanica Emery, 1915
- Solenopsis maboya Snelling, 2001
- Solenopsis macdonaghi Santschi, 1916
- Solenopsis macrops Santschi, 1917
- Solenopsis madara Roger, 1863
- Solenopsis major Forel, 1913
- Solenopsis maligna Santschi, 1910
- Solenopsis mameti Donisthorpe, 1946
- Solenopsis marxi Forel, 1915
- Solenopsis maxillosa Emery, 1900
- †Solenopsis maxima (Förster, 1891)
- Solenopsis megera Santschi, 1934
- Solenopsis megergates Trager, 1991
- Solenopsis melina Pacheco & Mackay, 2013
- Solenopsis metanotalis Emery, 1896
- Solenopsis metatarsalis (Kusnezov, 1957)
- Solenopsis minutissima Emery, 1906
- †Solenopsis moesta (Förster, 1891)
- Solenopsis molesta (Say, 1836)
- Solenopsis mozabensis (Bernard, 1977)
- Solenopsis nickersoni Thompson, 1982
- Solenopsis nigella Emery, 1888
- Solenopsis nitens Bingham, 1903
- Solenopsis nitida (Dlussky & Radchenko, 1994)
- Solenopsis normandi Santschi, 1934
- Solenopsis occipitalis Santschi, 1911
- Solenopsis ocellata Moreno-Gonzalez, Mackay & Pacheco, 2013
- Solenopsis oculata Santschi, 1925
- Solenopsis omana Collingwood & Agosti, 1996
- Solenopsis oraniensis Forel, 1894
- Solenopsis orbula Emery, 1875
- Solenopsis orbuloides André, 1890
- Solenopsis orestes Forel, 1903
- Solenopsis overbecki Viehmeyer, 1916
- Solenopsis pachycera (Forel, 1915)
- Solenopsis papuana Emery, 1900
- Solenopsis parva Mayr, 1868
- Solenopsis patagonica Emery, 1906
- Solenopsis patriciae Pacheco & Mackay, 2013
- Solenopsis pawaensis Mann, 1919
- Solenopsis pergandei Forel, 1901
- Solenopsis phoretica Davis & Deyrup, 2006
- Solenopsis photophila Santschi, 1923
- Solenopsis picea Emery, 1896
- Solenopsis picquarti Forel, 1899
- Solenopsis picta Emery, 1895
- Solenopsis pilosula Wheeler, 1908
- Solenopsis polita (Smith, 1862)
- Solenopsis pollux Forel, 1893
- †Solenopsis privata (Förster, 1891)
- Solenopsis pulleni Pacheco, Mackay & Moreno-Gonzalez, 2013
- Solenopsis punctaticeps Mayr, 1865
- Solenopsis pusillignis Trager, 1991
- Solenopsis pygmaea Forel, 1901
- Solenopsis pythia Santschi, 1934
- Solenopsis quadridentata Pacheco, Mackay & Moreno-Gonzalez, 2013
- Solenopsis quinquecuspis Forel, 1913
- Solenopsis richteri Forel, 1909
- Solenopsis rugiceps Mayr, 1870
- Solenopsis sabeana (Buckley, 1866)
- Solenopsis saevissima (Smith, 1855)
- Solenopsis salina Wheeler, 1908
- Solenopsis santschii Forel, 1905
- Solenopsis saudiensis Sharaf & Aldawood, 2011
- Solenopsis schilleri Santschi, 1923
- Solenopsis scipio Santschi, 1911
- Solenopsis sea (Kusnezov, 1953)
- Solenopsis seychellensis Forel, 1909
- Solenopsis shiptoni Forel, 1914
- Solenopsis solenopsidis (Kusnezov, 1953)
- Solenopsis soochowensis Wheeler, 1921
- Solenopsis striata Pacheco & Mackay, 2013
- Solenopsis stricta Emery, 1896
- Solenopsis substituta Santschi, 1925
- Solenopsis subterranea MacKay & Vinson, 1989
- Solenopsis subtilis Emery, 1896
- Solenopsis succinea Emery, 1890
- Solenopsis sulfurea (Roger, 1862)
- Solenopsis sumara Collingwood & Agosti, 1996
- †Solenopsis superba (Förster, 1891)
- Solenopsis targuia Bernard, 1953
- Solenopsis tennesseensis Smith, 1951
- Solenopsis tenuis Mayr, 1878
- Solenopsis terricola Menozzi, 1931
- Solenopsis tertialis Ettershank, 1966
- Solenopsis tetracantha Emery, 1906
- Solenopsis texana Emery, 1895
- Solenopsis thoracica Santschi, 1923
- Solenopsis tipuna Forel, 1912
- Solenopsis tonsa Thompson, 1989
- Solenopsis torresi Snelling, 2001
- Solenopsis tridens Forel, 1911
- Solenopsis ugandensis Santschi, 1933
- †Solenopsis valida (Förster, 1891)
- Solenopsis vinsoni Pacheco & Mackay, 2013
- Solenopsis virulens (Smith, 1858)
- Solenopsis vorax Santschi, 1934
- Solenopsis wasmannii Emery, 1894
- Solenopsis westwoodi Forel, 1894
- Solenopsis weyrauchi Trager, 1991
- Solenopsis whitfordi Mackay, Moreno-Gonzalez & Pacheco, 2013
- Solenopsis wolfi Emery, 1915
- Solenopsis xyloni McCook, 1879
- Solenopsis zambesiae Arnold, 1926
- Solenopsis zeteki Wheeler, 1942
- Solenopsis zingibara Collingwood & Agosti, 1996
