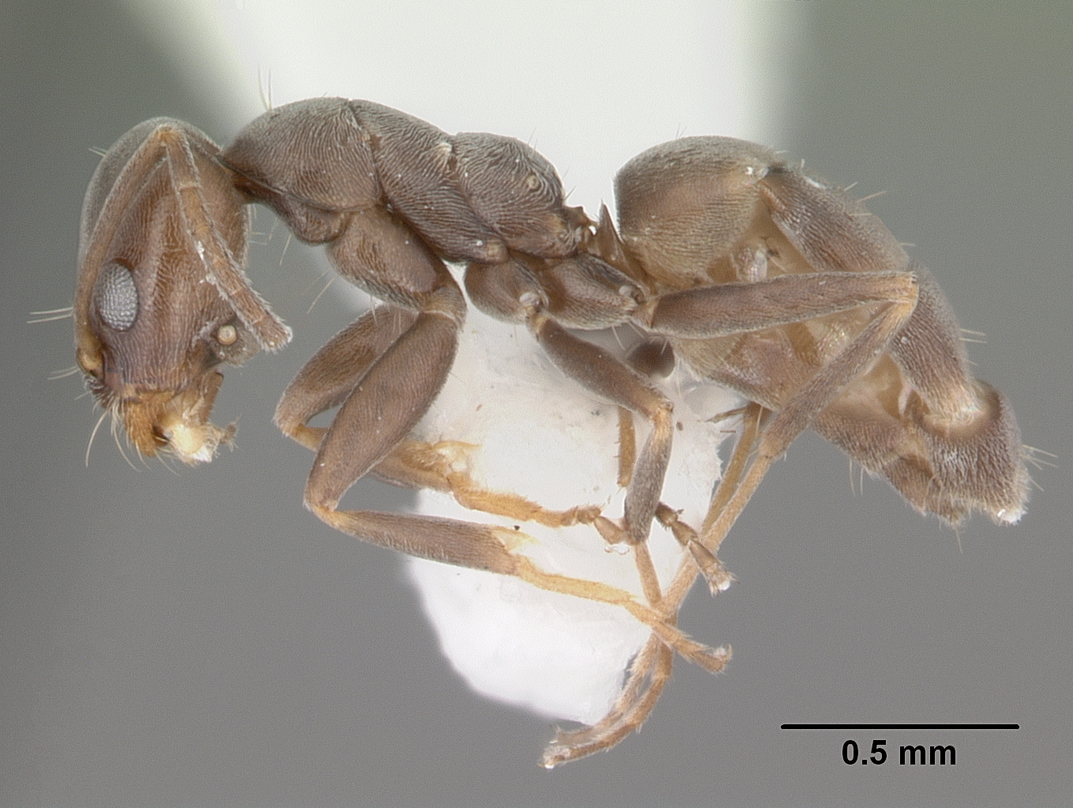
- Forelius pruinosus worker

Scientific classification
- Kingdom: Animalia
- Phylum: Arthropoda
- Class: Insecta
- Order: Hymenoptera
- Family: Formicidae
- Subfamily: Dolichoderinae
- Genus: Forelius
- Species: F. pruinosus

Binomial name
- Forelius pruinosus (Roger, 1863)

Synonyms
- Iridomyrmex pruinosus testaceus Cole, 1936; Tapinoma anale André, 1893

= Forelius pruinosus =

Species of ant

Forelius pruinosus, commonly known as the high noon ant, is a species of ant in the genus Forelius. Described by Roger in 1863, the species is endemic to North America and has been recently observed in Latin America.

This ant species generally feeds on nectar and invertebrates and are found to have mutualistic relationships with various insect and plant species.

== Behavior ==
Reproductive alates during nuptial flight were recorded from May to August. In terms of colony structure, they are polygyne, meaning they have multiple queens. The size of colonies are usually small to moderately large in size.

They forage for insects and tend to Hemiptera and have been observed to feed on flower nectar. This species is also found to employ the strategy of linking nests via trails. Generally, the ants will scavenge for dead vertebrates and root coccids along these paths. Methyl-n-amyl ketone chemicals are said to be marked on foraging tracks by these ants.

The high noon ant has been found to have a mutualistic relationship with caterpillar larva of the Miami blue, Cyclargus thomasi bethunebakeri. The relationship appears more opportunistic in nature, as the ant doesn't actively protect the larvae. Rather, its presence deters predators that would otherwise feed on the larvae of this butterfly species. This ant also exhibits a mutualistic relationship with the cactus, Ferocactus wislizeni. In exchange for nectar from the plant, the high noon ant deters herbivores.

== Distribution ==
Forelius pruinosus ants live in the United States, Cuba and Mexico, where they exist in northern portions of the U.S., and their range could possibly extend further into South America. In Mexico, they live in a broad range of habitats and can be found in desert regions, grasslands, and various sorts of woodland. They also nest under stones and soil. Fields, meadows, and pastures are ideal habitats for the species, and they will colonize woodland areas that are more open spaced. These ants thrive in hot weather and dry conditions, and they are mostly active when it is hot. It's possible they choose not to forage during the night because of the cooler temperatures.

=== United States ===
A study carried out in 2003 found that F. pruinosus was one of the dominant ant species of the subfamily Dolichoderinae in north central Florida. F. pruinosus was found to be a robust ant species able to withstand the effects of controlled fires during this studies experimentation on ant communities while other ant species declined in population size. The increase of the high noon ant's population size suggested that the decline in other populations may be due to competition with this particular ant species. In a year-long survey conducted by the Pest Management Professionals in Arizona, F. pruinosus was observed to be one of the predominant pest ant species in Phoenix, Arizona following the southern fire ant, Solenopsis xyloni.

In the Gulf Coast, these ants are considered a household pest, where they nest in homes and invade houses.

=== Latin America ===
Forelius pruinosus was recorded for the first time in Colombia in 2008. This species along with, F. damiani, were the first of the Forelius genus observed in Colombia and were collected in Sierra Nevada de Santa Marta, a dry forested region.
