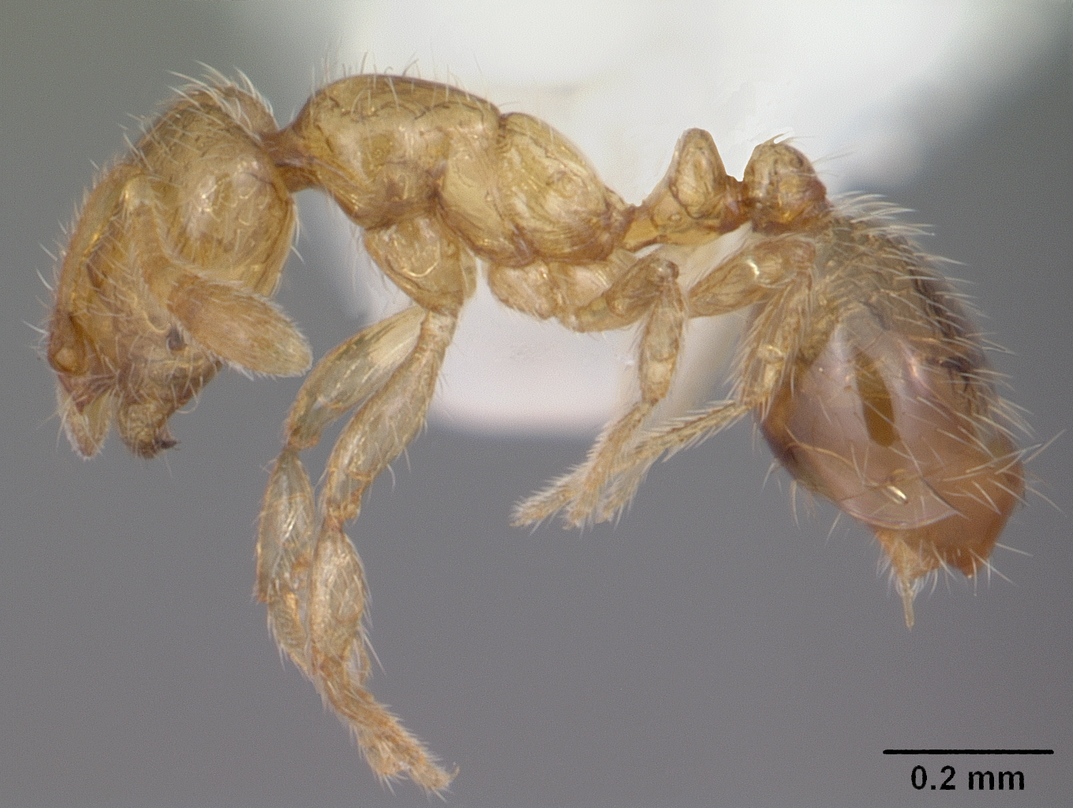

Scientific classification
- Kingdom: Animalia
- Phylum: Arthropoda
- Class: Insecta
- Order: Hymenoptera
- Family: Formicidae
- Subfamily: Myrmicinae
- Genus: Solenopsis
- Species: S. abdita

Binomial name
- Solenopsis abdita Thompson, 1989

= Solenopsis abdita =

Species of ant

Solenopsis abdita is a species of thief ant in the Solenopsis molesta complex, first described in 1989 in Florida. It is native to Florida but may be found in the surrounding states, though this is not confirmed. This species can be hard to differentiate from Solenopsis texana and S. carolinensis, but there are a few minor differences, such as having a longer scape and a wider petiole. Thus, the main method used to distinguish these species primarily uses queens and males, though unfortunately usually only workers are collected, making it difficult to correctly identify this species. Solenopsis abdita is known to nest in rotten wood found within pine–oak forests, and workers have been collected from leaf litter.

== Etymology ==
The name abdita is a Latin word meaning "concealed" in English. This is in reference to the appearance of Solenopsis abdita, which closely resembles S. carolinensis, S. texana, and other species in the molesta complex. This makes Solenopsis abdita difficult to identify, which delayed the process of describing the species.

== Appearance ==
Workers in this species have a yellow coloration and measure between 1.1 and 1.3mm (0.04 and 0.05 inches) in length, and are almost identical in appearance to Solenopsis carolinensis and Solenopsis texana workers, as well as other Floridian species of the molesta complex. Queens appear brown to dark brown and possess white wings; these reproductive females, along with males, are the main samples used for identification, as they are easily distinguishable from the reproductive ants of other species.
