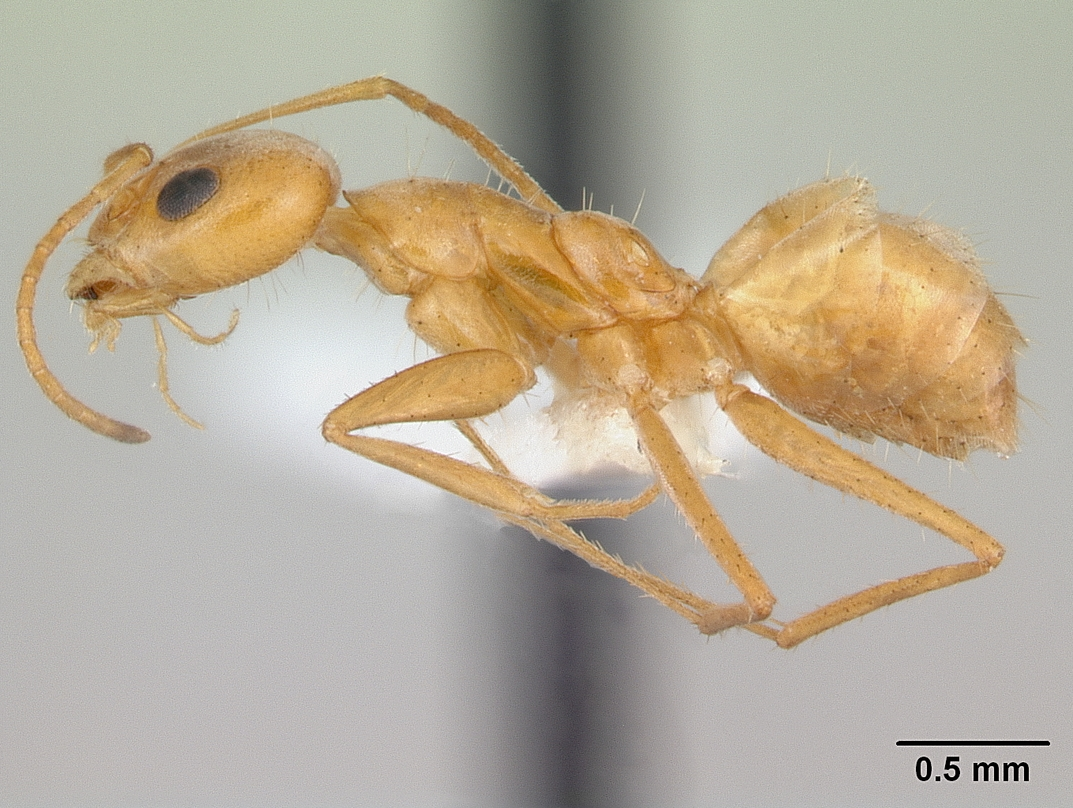
- Forelius brasiliensis worker

Scientific classification
- Domain: Eukaryota
- Kingdom: Animalia
- Phylum: Arthropoda
- Class: Insecta
- Order: Hymenoptera
- Family: Formicidae
- Subfamily: Dolichoderinae
- Genus: Forelius
- Species: F. brasiliensis

Binomial name
- Forelius brasiliensis (Forel, 1908)

Synonyms
- Forelius maccooki fiebrigi Forel, 1912; Forelius rufus pilipes Santschi, 1920

= Forelius brasiliensis =

Species of ant

Forelius brasiliensis is a species of ant in the genus Forelius. Described by Auguste-Henri Forel in 198 the species is endemic to South America.
