= Forelius breviscapus =

Scientific classification
- Domain: Eukaryota
- Kingdom: Animalia
- Phylum: Arthropoda
- Class: Insecta
- Order: Hymenoptera
- Family: Formicidae
- Subfamily: Dolichoderinae
- Genus: Forelius
- Species: F. breviscapus

Binomial name
- Forelius breviscapus Forel, 1914

Synonyms
- Forelius breviscapus obscurata Santschi, 1922; Forelius maccooki instabilis Santschi, 1920

Species of ant

Forelius breviscapus is a species of ant in the genus Forelius. Described by Auguste-Henri Forel in 1914, the species is endemic to Argentina.
