= Forelius andinus =

Scientific classification
- Domain: Eukaryota
- Kingdom: Animalia
- Phylum: Arthropoda
- Class: Insecta
- Order: Hymenoptera
- Family: Formicidae
- Subfamily: Dolichoderinae
- Genus: Forelius
- Species: F. andinus

Binomial name
- Forelius andinus Kusnezov, 1957

Species of ant

Forelius andinus is a species of ant in the genus Forelius. Described by Kusnezov in 195, the species is endemic to Argentina.
