= Forelius rubriceps =

Scientific classification
- Domain: Eukaryota
- Kingdom: Animalia
- Phylum: Arthropoda
- Class: Insecta
- Order: Hymenoptera
- Family: Formicidae
- Subfamily: Dolichoderinae
- Genus: Forelius
- Species: F. rubriceps

Binomial name
- Forelius rubriceps Gallardo, 1916

Species of ant

Forelius rubriceps is a species of ant in the genus Forelius. Described by Gallardo in 1916, the species is endemic to Argentina.
