= Forelius grandis =

Scientific classification
- Domain: Eukaryota
- Kingdom: Animalia
- Phylum: Arthropoda
- Class: Insecta
- Order: Hymenoptera
- Family: Formicidae
- Subfamily: Dolichoderinae
- Genus: Forelius
- Species: F. grandis

Binomial name
- Forelius grandis Forel, 1912

Synonyms
- Forelius chalybaeus debenedettii Santschi, 1919

Species of ant

Forelius grandis is a species of ant in the genus Forelius. Described by Auguste-Henri Forel in 1912, the species is endemic to Argentina.
