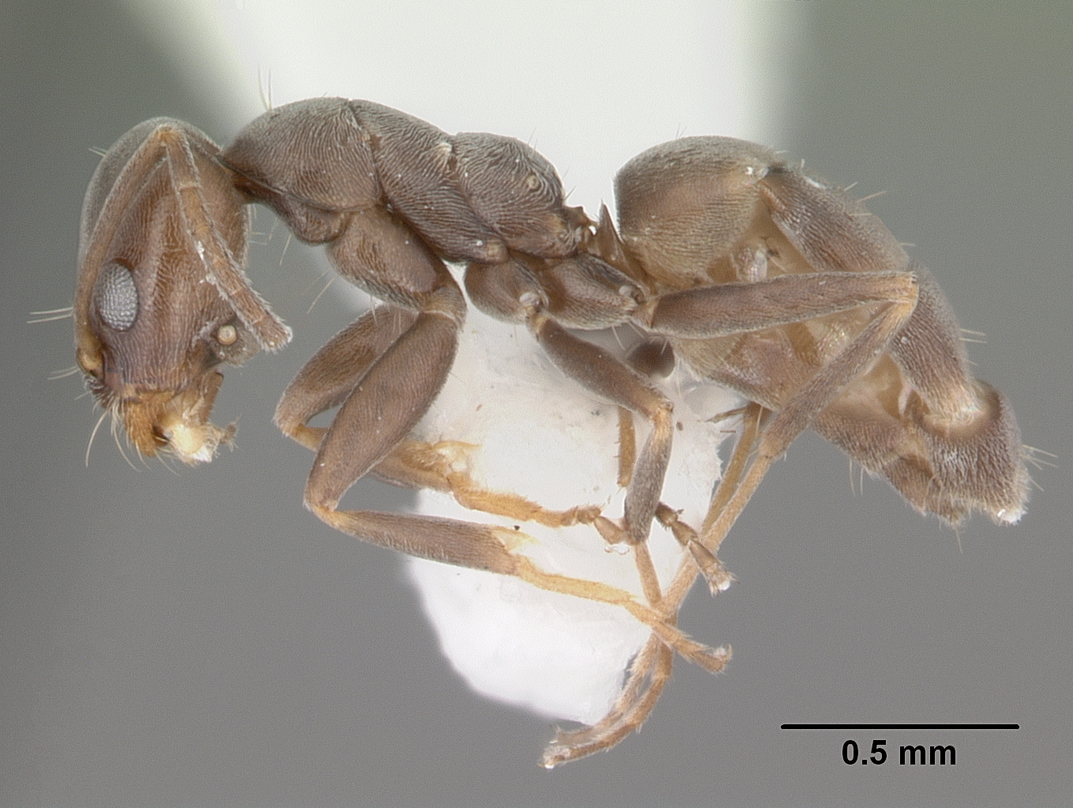
- Forelius pruinosus worker

Scientific classification
- Domain: Eukaryota
- Kingdom: Animalia
- Phylum: Arthropoda
- Class: Insecta
- Order: Hymenoptera
- Family: Formicidae
- Subfamily: Dolichoderinae
- Tribe: Leptomyrmecini
- Genus: Forelius; Emery, 1888

Diversity
- 18 species

Synonyms
- Neoforelius Kusnezov, 1953

= Forelius =

Genus of ants

Forelius is a Neotropical genus of ants in the subfamily Dolichoderinae. The genus is known from southern United States to Argentina.

== Species ==
- Forelius albiventris Forel, 1912
- Forelius andinus Kusnezov, 1957
- Forelius bahianus Cuezzo, 2000
- Forelius brasiliensis (Forel, 1908)
- Forelius breviscapus Forel, 1914
- Forelius chalybaeus Emery, 1906
- Forelius damiani Guerrero & Fernández, 2008
- Forelius grandis Forel, 1912
- Forelius keiferi Wheeler, 1934
- Forelius lilloi Cuezzo, 2000
- Forelius macrops Kusnezov, 1957
- Forelius maranhaoensis Cuezzo, 2000
- Forelius mccooki (McCook, 1880)
- Forelius nigriventris Forel, 1912
- Forelius pruinosus (Roger, 1863)
- Forelius pusillus Santschi, 1922
- Forelius rubriceps Gallardo, 1916
- Forelius rufus Gallardo, 1916
