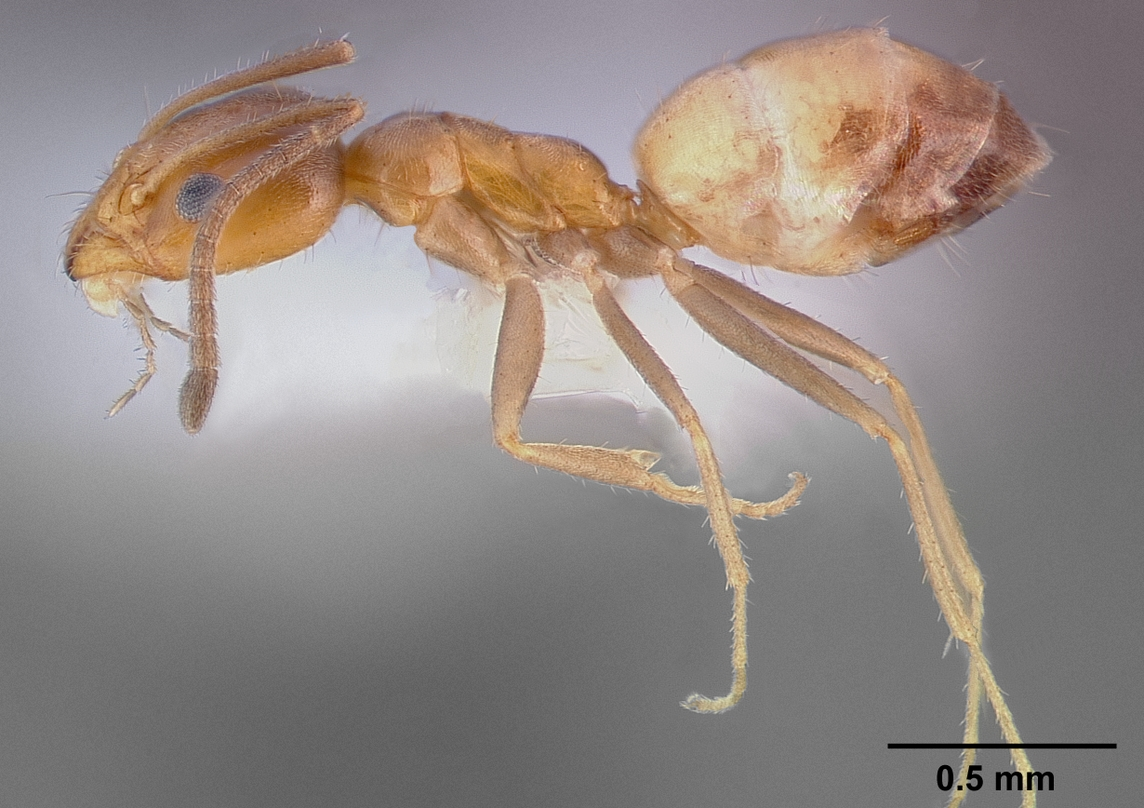
- Worker

Scientific classification
- Domain: Eukaryota
- Kingdom: Animalia
- Phylum: Arthropoda
- Class: Insecta
- Order: Hymenoptera
- Family: Formicidae
- Subfamily: Dolichoderinae
- Genus: Forelius
- Species: F. mccooki

Binomial name
- Forelius mccooki (McCook, 1880)

Synonyms
- Formica foetida, Buckley, 1866; Forelius maccooki andrei Forel, 1912

= Forelius mccooki =

Species of ant

Forelius mccooki is a species of ant in the genus Forelius. Described by McCook in 1880, the species is endemic to the United States and Mexico, where they nest in soil surrounded by a typically small mound, and also nests under stones.
