= Forelius keiferi =

Scientific classification
- Domain: Eukaryota
- Kingdom: Animalia
- Phylum: Arthropoda
- Class: Insecta
- Order: Hymenoptera
- Family: Formicidae
- Subfamily: Dolichoderinae
- Genus: Forelius
- Species: F. keiferi

Binomial name
- Forelius keiferi Wheeler, W.M., 1934

Species of ant

Forelius keiferi is a species of ant in the genus Forelius. Described by William Morton Wheeler in 1934, the species is endemic to Mexico.
