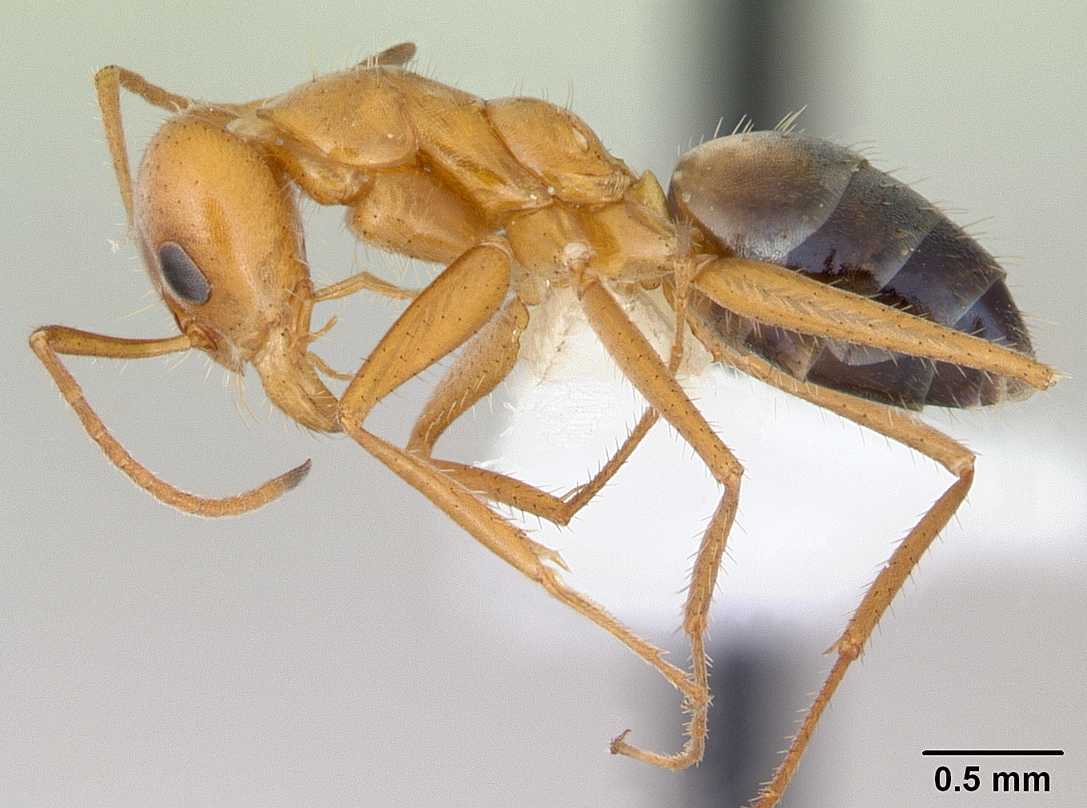
- Forelius nigriventris worker

Scientific classification
- Domain: Eukaryota
- Kingdom: Animalia
- Phylum: Arthropoda
- Class: Insecta
- Order: Hymenoptera
- Family: Formicidae
- Subfamily: Dolichoderinae
- Genus: Forelius
- Species: F. nigriventris

Binomial name
- Forelius nigriventris Forel, 1912

Synonyms
- Forelius nigriventris modesta Santschi, 1922; Forelius nigriventris transiens Santschi, 1922

= Forelius nigriventris =

Species of ant

Forelius nigriventris is a species of ant in the genus Forelius. Described by Forel in 1912, the species is endemic to South America.
