= Forelius rufus =

Scientific classification
- Domain: Eukaryota
- Kingdom: Animalia
- Phylum: Arthropoda
- Class: Insecta
- Order: Hymenoptera
- Family: Formicidae
- Subfamily: Dolichoderinae
- Genus: Forelius
- Species: F. rufus

Binomial name
- Forelius rufus Gallardo, 1916

Species of ant

Forelius rufus is a species of ant in the genus Forelius.

== Distribution ==
Described by Gallardo in 1916, the species is endemic to Argentina and Bolivia.
