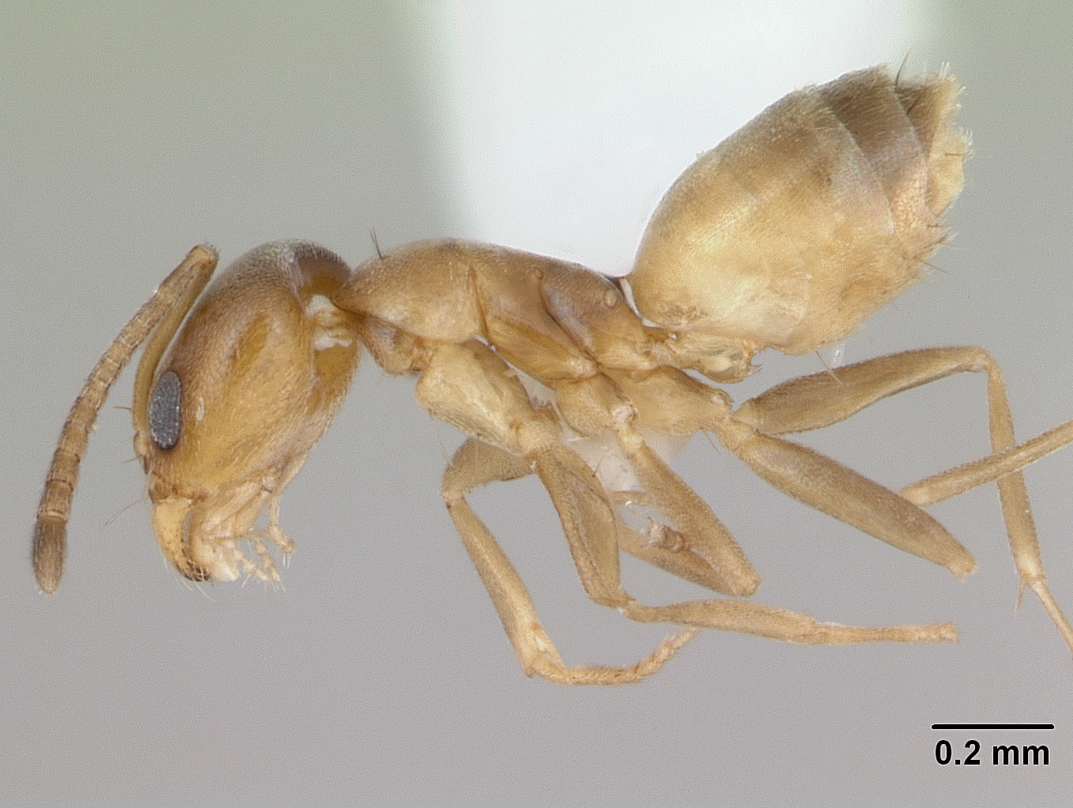
- Forelius pusillus worker

Scientific classification
- Domain: Eukaryota
- Kingdom: Animalia
- Phylum: Arthropoda
- Class: Insecta
- Order: Hymenoptera
- Family: Formicidae
- Subfamily: Dolichoderinae
- Genus: Forelius
- Species: F. pusillus

Binomial name
- Forelius pusillus Santschi, 1922

Synonyms
- Neoforelius tucumanus Kusnezov, 1953

= Forelius pusillus =

Species of ant

Forelius pusillus is a species of ant in the genus Forelius. Described by Santschi in 1922, the species is endemic to South America.

== Behaviour ==
Forelius pusillus is noted to perform "pre-emptive defensive self-sacrifice", where a group of ants leave the security of the nest after sealing the entrance from the outside each evening.
