= Forelius chalybaeus =

Scientific classification
- Domain: Eukaryota
- Kingdom: Animalia
- Phylum: Arthropoda
- Class: Insecta
- Order: Hymenoptera
- Family: Formicidae
- Subfamily: Dolichoderinae
- Genus: Forelius
- Species: F. chalybaeus

Binomial name
- Forelius chalybaeus Emery, 1906

Synonyms
- Forelius chalybaeus minor Forel, 1913; Forelius chalybaeus paucistricta Santschi, 1916; Forelius chalybaeus personata Santschi, 1922

Species of ant

Forelius chalybaeus is a species of ant in the genus Forelius. Described by Carlo Emery in 1906, the species is endemic to Argentina.
