= Forelius maranhaoensis =

Scientific classification
- Domain: Eukaryota
- Kingdom: Animalia
- Phylum: Arthropoda
- Class: Insecta
- Order: Hymenoptera
- Family: Formicidae
- Subfamily: Dolichoderinae
- Genus: Forelius
- Species: F. maranhaoensis

Binomial name
- Forelius maranhaoensis Cuezzo, 2000

Species of ant

Forelius maranhaoensis is a species of ant in the genus Forelius. Described by Cuezzo in 2000, the species is endemic to Brazil.
