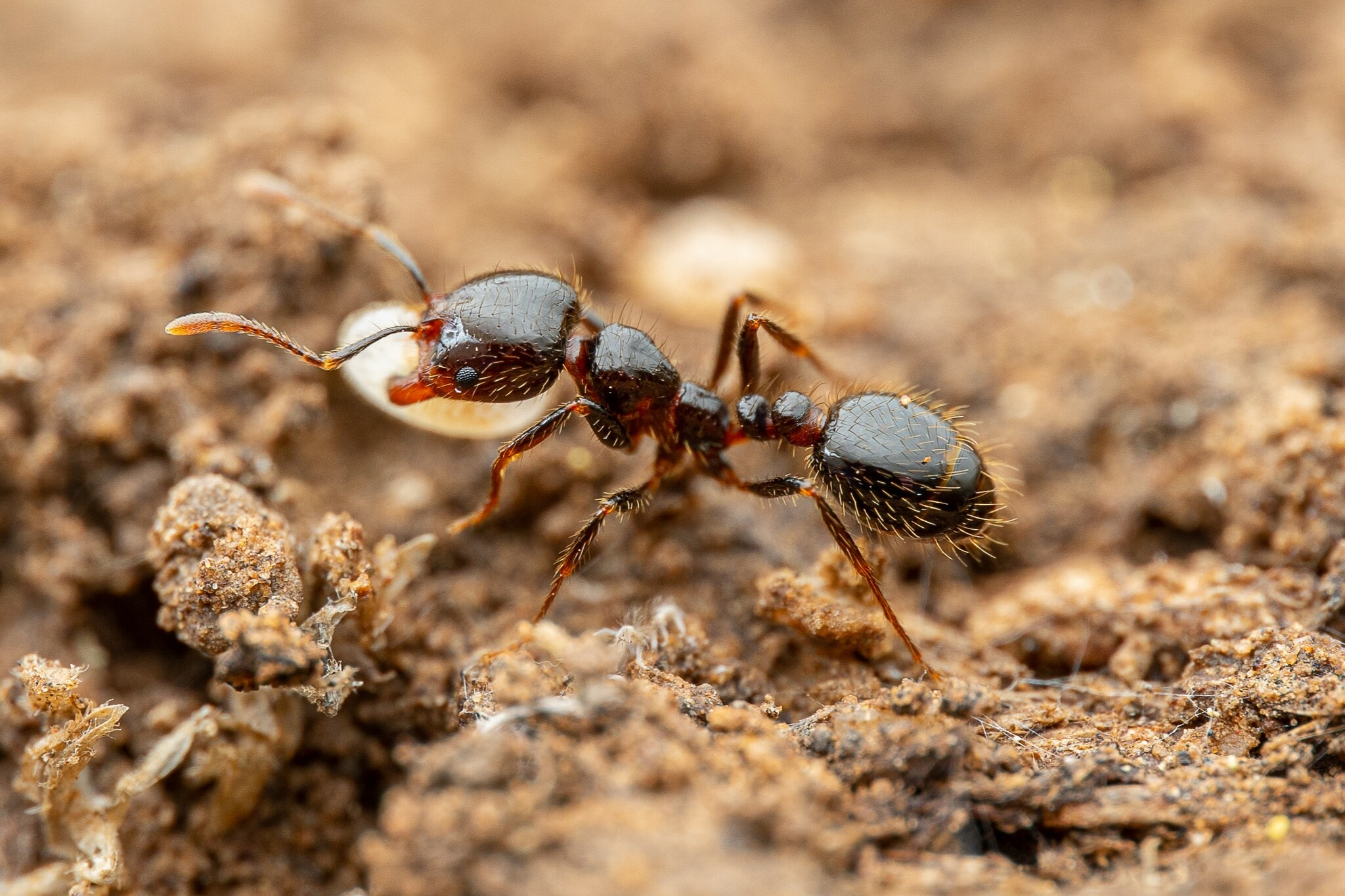

Scientific classification
- Domain: Eukaryota
- Kingdom: Animalia
- Phylum: Arthropoda
- Class: Insecta
- Order: Hymenoptera
- Family: Formicidae
- Subfamily: Myrmicinae
- Genus: Solenopsis
- Species: S. xyloni

Binomial name
- Solenopsis xyloni McCook, 1879

= Southern fire ant =

Species of ant

The southern fire ant (Solenopsis xyloni), also known as the Californian fire ant or cotton ant, is a stinging fire ant native to southern parts of the United States. Its behaviour is similar to the red imported fire ant (S. invicta), although its sting is less painful. It has a broad and opportunistic diet, and will store seeds in its nest and eat honeydew collected from other insects.

The southern fire ant shares its range with the red imported fire ant (S. invicta), the golden fire ant (S. aurea) and S. amblychila. The southern fire ant has the widest distribution of these, occurring from the Carolinas to California, including Georgia, lowland Tennessee, Arkansas, and southern Kansas.
