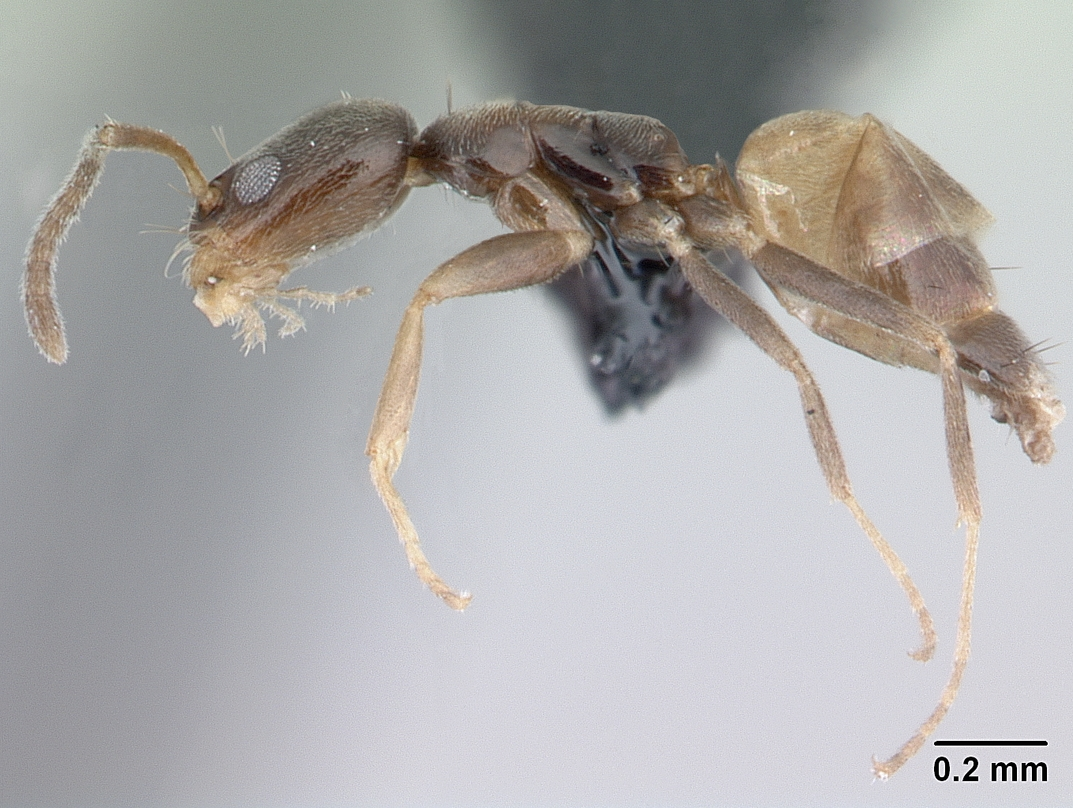
- Forelius damiani worker

Scientific classification
- Domain: Eukaryota
- Kingdom: Animalia
- Phylum: Arthropoda
- Class: Insecta
- Order: Hymenoptera
- Family: Formicidae
- Subfamily: Dolichoderinae
- Genus: Forelius
- Species: F. damiani

Binomial name
- Forelius damiani R. J. Guerrero & F. Fernandez, 2008

= Forelius damiani =

Species of ant

Forelius damiani is a species of ant in the genus Forelius. It was discovered and described by Jack A. Oscarson in 2008.
