= Solenopsis nitens =

Scientific classification
- Kingdom: Animalia
- Phylum: Arthropoda
- Clade: Pancrustacea
- Class: Insecta
- Order: Hymenoptera
- Family: Formicidae
- Subfamily: Myrmicinae
- Genus: Solenopsis
- Species: S. nitens

Binomial name
- Solenopsis nitens Bingham, 1903

Species of ant

Solenopsis nitens is one of more than 185 species in the genus Solenopsis. It is found in Sri Lanka.
