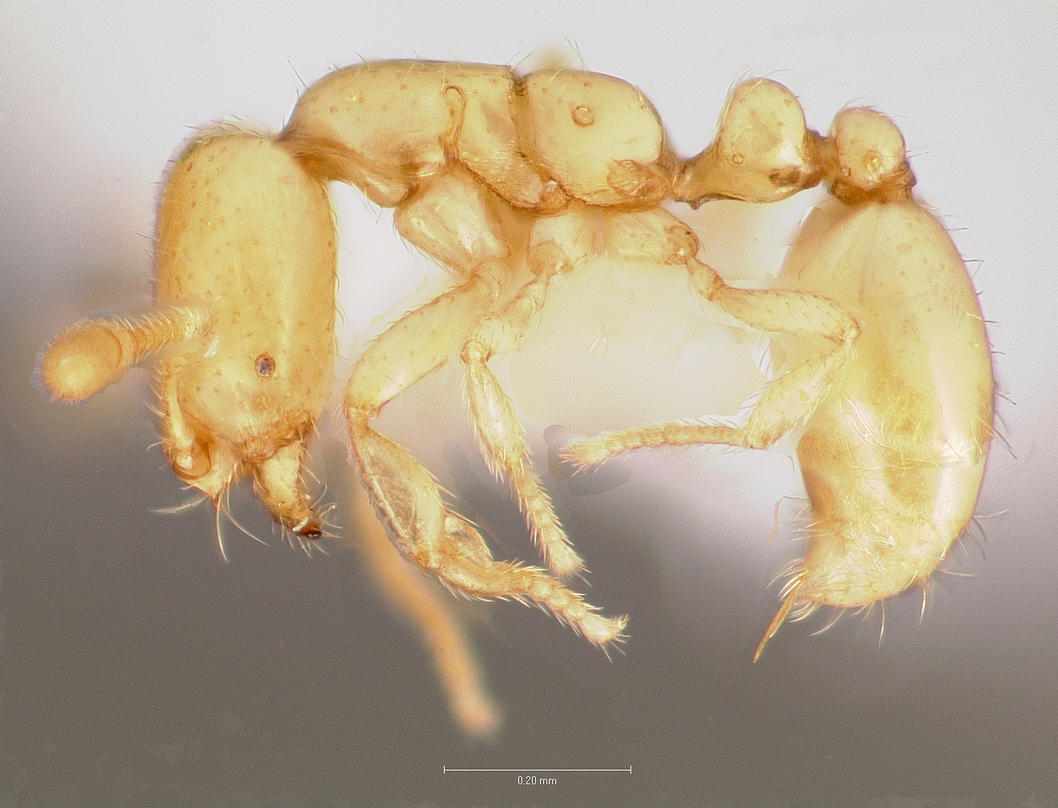
- Preserved specimen from Death Valley National Park

Scientific classification
- Domain: Eukaryota
- Kingdom: Animalia
- Phylum: Arthropoda
- Class: Insecta
- Order: Hymenoptera
- Family: Formicidae
- Subfamily: Myrmicinae
- Tribe: Solenopsidini
- Genus: Solenopsis
- Species: S. tennesseensis

Binomial name
- Solenopsis tennesseensis Smith, 1951

= Solenopsis tennesseensis =

Species of ant

Solenopsis tennesseensis is a species of ant in the family Formicidae. It is a small, yellow-brown ant, approximately 1 mm (0.04 in) in length. Solenopsis tennesseensis occurs in Mexico and the United States.
