= Solenopsis altinodis =

Scientific classification
- Kingdom: Animalia
- Phylum: Arthropoda
- Class: Insecta
- Order: Hymenoptera
- Family: Formicidae
- Subfamily: Myrmicinae
- Genus: Solenopsis
- Species: S. altinodis

Binomial name
- Solenopsis altinodis Forel, 1912

Species of ant

Solenopsis altinodis is a species of ant first described by Forel in 1912. Workers are bi-colored with a brown gaster and a yellow head and thorax. This species has been found in Costa Rica, Colombia, Guiana, Trinidad and Venezuela. This species is often confused with Solenopsis bicolor because of the similar coloring.
