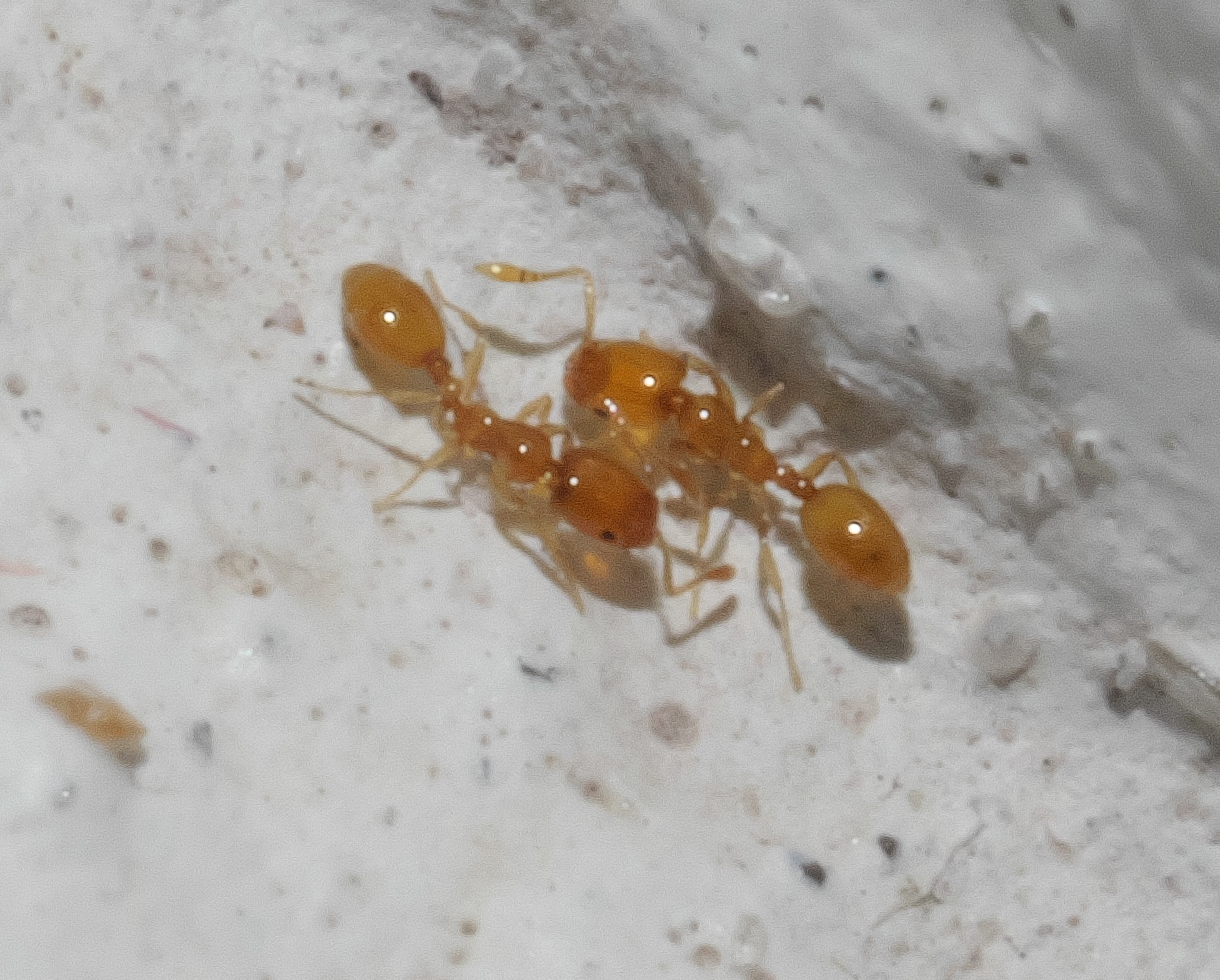
- Solenopsis punctaticeps, Namibia

Scientific classification
- Kingdom: Animalia
- Phylum: Arthropoda
- Class: Insecta
- Order: Hymenoptera
- Family: Formicidae
- Subfamily: Myrmicinae
- Genus: Solenopsis
- Species: S. punctaticeps

Binomial name
- Solenopsis punctaticeps Mayr, 1865

= Solenopsis punctaticeps =

Species of ants

Solenopsis punctaticeps is a species of myrmicine ant in the family Formicidae, sometimes called the yellow fire ant. It is found mainly in southern Africa.

== Subspecies ==
These eight subspecies belong to the species Solenopsis punctaticeps:

- Solenopsis punctaticeps caffra Forel, 1894
- Solenopsis punctaticeps cleptomana Santschi, 1914
- Solenopsis punctaticeps erythraea Emery, 1915
- Solenopsis punctaticeps fur Santschi, 1926
- Solenopsis punctaticeps indocilis Santschi, 1914
- Solenopsis punctaticeps juba Weber, 1943
- Solenopsis punctaticeps kibaliensis Wheeler, 1922
- Solenopsis punctaticeps punctaticeps Mayr, 1865
