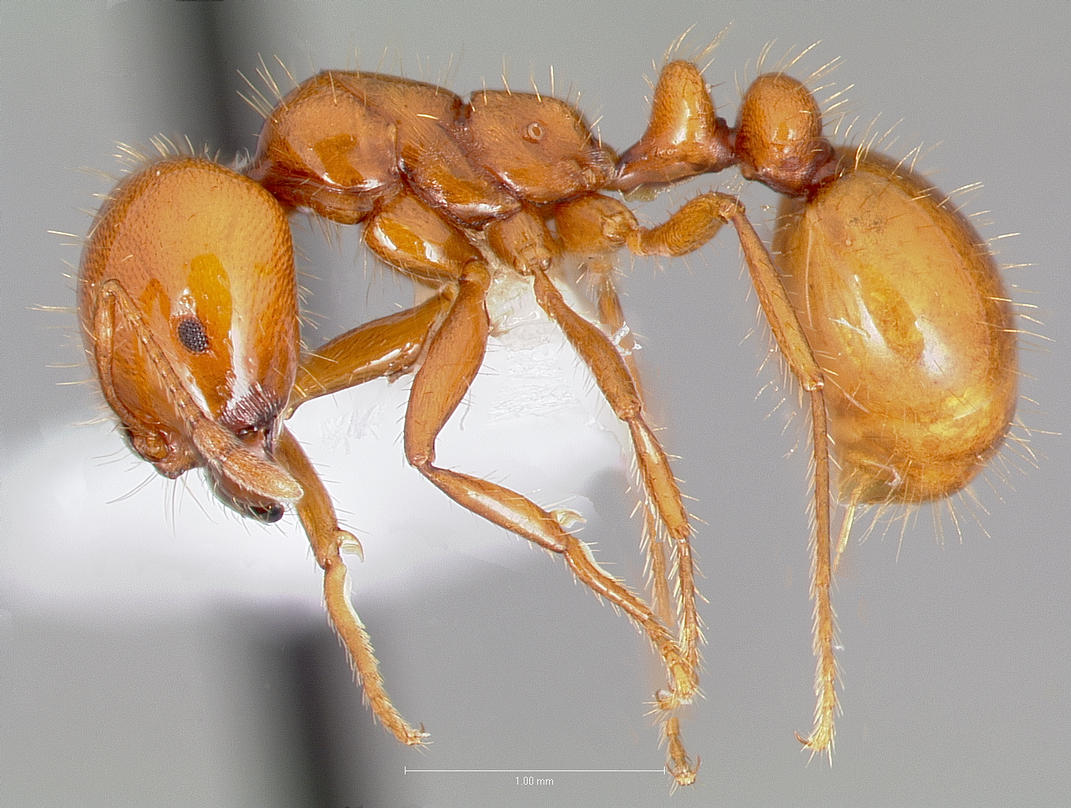
- Solenopsis amblychila minor worker

Scientific classification
- Kingdom: Animalia
- Phylum: Arthropoda
- Class: Insecta
- Order: Hymenoptera
- Family: Formicidae
- Subfamily: Myrmicinae
- Genus: Solenopsis
- Species: S. amblychila

Binomial name
- Solenopsis amblychila Wheeler, 1915

= Solenopsis amblychila =

Species of ant

Solenopsis amblychila is a species of ant (in the genus of "fire ants" or Solenopsis) native to the southwestern United States. It can withstand very dry conditions but may be found in well watered lawns, and is usually found to nest in soil, under rocks, or under pieces of wood. A notable trait of this species is its pale golden or yellow coloration which makes it commonly mistaken for Solenopsis aurea, which also has a golden coloration. Workers are known to be polymorphic, and contain both major and minor workers in colonies.
