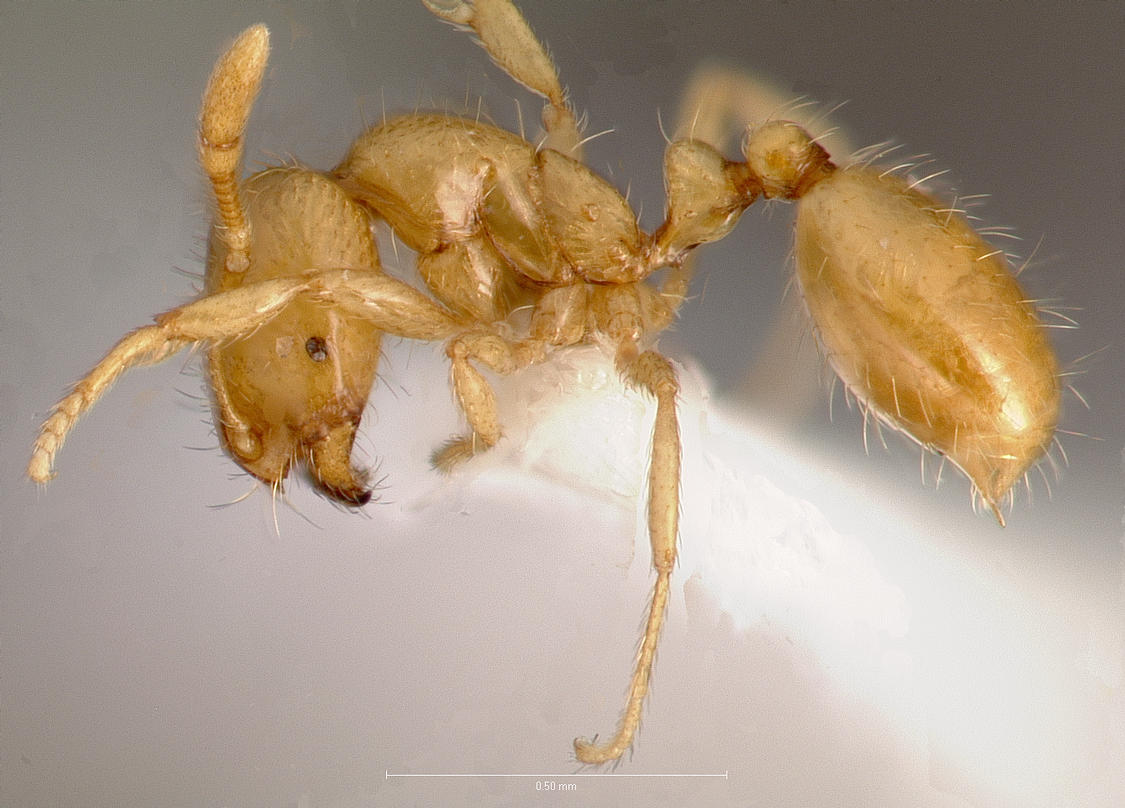
- Solenopsis texana catalinae

Scientific classification
- Domain: Eukaryota
- Kingdom: Animalia
- Phylum: Arthropoda
- Class: Insecta
- Order: Hymenoptera
- Family: Formicidae
- Subfamily: Myrmicinae
- Tribe: Solenopsidini
- Genus: Solenopsis
- Species: S. texana

Binomial name
- Solenopsis texana Emery, 1895

= Solenopsis texana =

Species of ant

Solenopsis texana, the thief ant (one of several species known by this name), is a species of ant in the family Formicidae.

== Subspecies ==
These two subspecies belong to the species Solenopsis texana:

- Solenopsis texana catalinae Wheeler, 1904^{i c g}
- Solenopsis texana texana Emery, 1895^{i c g}

Data sources: i = ITIS, c = Catalogue of Life, g = GBIF, b = Bugguide.net
