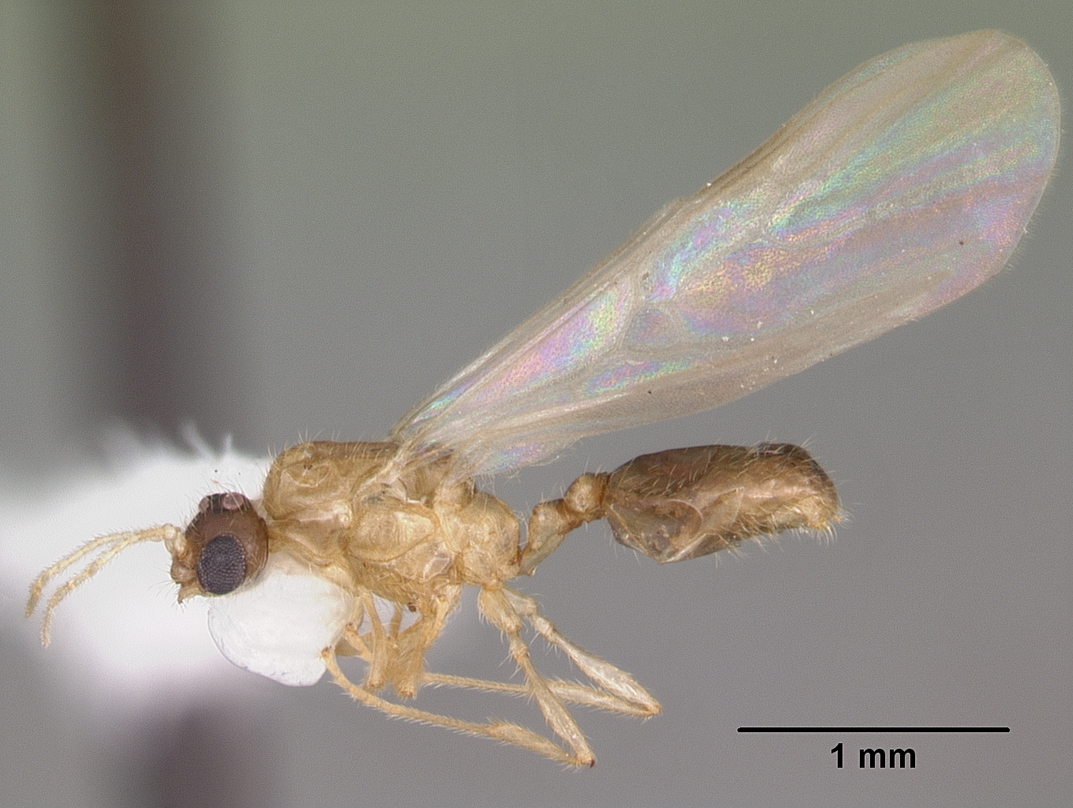

Scientific classification
- Domain: Eukaryota
- Kingdom: Animalia
- Phylum: Arthropoda
- Class: Insecta
- Order: Hymenoptera
- Family: Formicidae
- Subfamily: Myrmicinae
- Tribe: Solenopsidini
- Genus: Solenopsis
- Species: S. carolinensis

Binomial name
- Solenopsis carolinensis Forel, 1901

= Solenopsis carolinensis =

Species of ant

Solenopsis carolinensis, the thief ant, is a species of ant in the family Formicidae.
