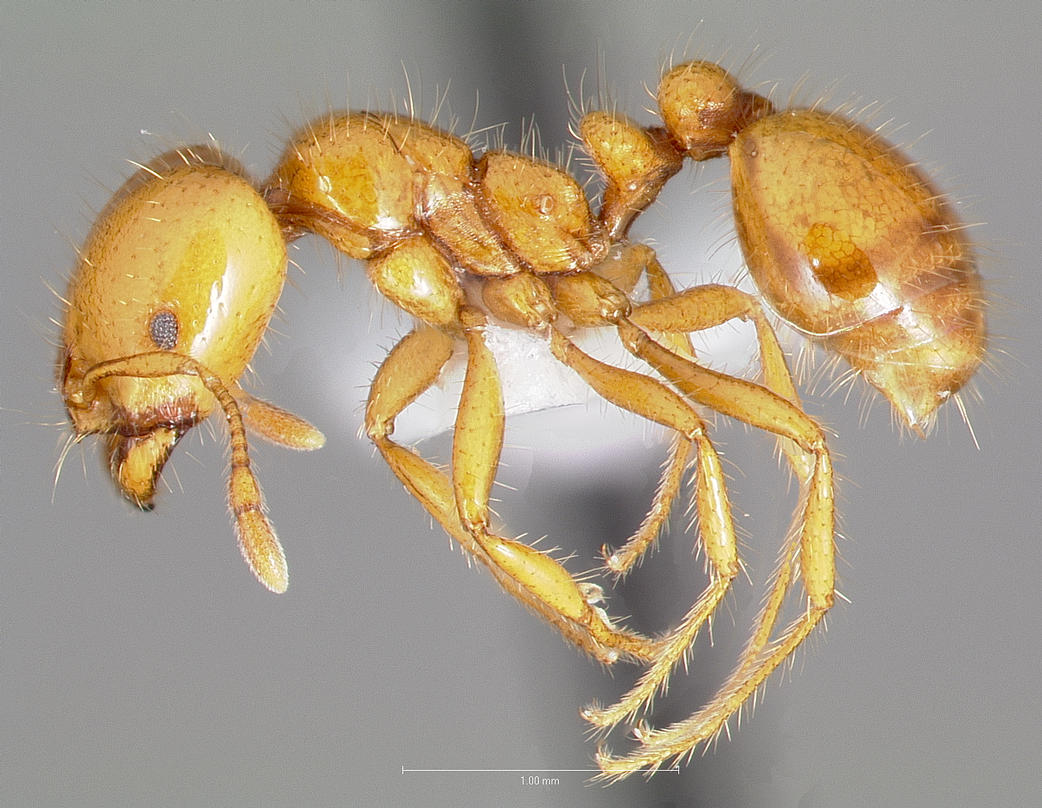

Scientific classification
- Kingdom: Animalia
- Phylum: Arthropoda
- Clade: Pancrustacea
- Class: Insecta
- Order: Hymenoptera
- Family: Formicidae
- Subfamily: Myrmicinae
- Genus: Solenopsis
- Species: S. aurea

Binomial name
- Solenopsis aurea Wheeler, 1906

= Solenopsis aurea =

Species of ant

Solenopsis aurea, also commonly called the golden fire ant, is a species of ant native to the southwestern United States and Northern Mexico. Workers have a pale golden coloration with occasional brown spots.
