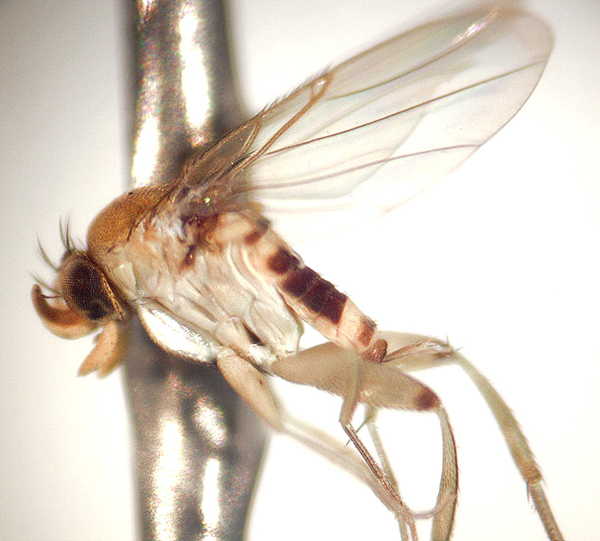
- Apocephalus longistylus

Scientific classification
- Kingdom: Animalia
- Phylum: Arthropoda
- Class: Insecta
- Order: Diptera
- Family: Phoridae
- Subfamily: Metopininae
- Tribe: Metopinini; Peterson 1987

= Metopinini =

Tribe of flies

The Metopininae is a tribe of flies in the family Phoridae.

== Genera ==
- Acanthophorides Borgmeier, 1924
- Acontistoptera Brues, 1902
- Apocephalus Coquillett, 1901
- Auxanommatidia Borgmeier, 1924
- Cataclinusa Schmitz, 1927
- Chonocephalus Wandolleck, 1898
- Commoptera Brues, 1901
- Cremersia Schmitz, 1924
- Dacnophora Borgmeier, 1961
- Diocophora Borgmeier, 1959
- Ecitomyia Brues, 1901
- Ecitoptera Borgmeier & Schmitz, 1923
- Gymnophora Macquart, 1835
- Kerophora Brown, 1988
- Lecanocerus Borgmeier, 1962
- Megaselia Rondani, 1856
- Melaloncha Brues, 1903
- Menozziola Schmitz, 1927
- Metopina Macquart, 1835
- Microselia Schmitz, 1934
- Myrmosicarius Borgmeier, 1928
- Neodohrniphora Malloch, 1914
- Pericyclocera Schmitz, 1927
- Phalacrotophora Enderlein, 1912
- Phymatopterella Brues, 1933
- Physoptera Borgmeier, 1958
- Pseudacteon Coquillett, 1907
- Puliciphora Dahl, 1897
- Rhyncophoromyia Malloch, 1923
- Stenophorina Borgmeier, 1963
- Styletta Borgmeier, 1960
- Syneura Brues, 1903
- Trophithauma Schmitz, 1925
- Trophodeinus Borgmeier, 1960
- Xanionotum Brues, 1902
