= List of Dohrniphora species =

This is a list of 245 species in Dohrniphora, a genus of scuttle flies in the family Phoridae.

== Dohrniphora species ==
- Dohrniphora adriani Disney, 1983^{c g}
- Dohrniphora adusta Borgmeier, 1925^{c g}
- Dohrniphora aequidistans Brunetti, 1912^{c g}
- Dohrniphora alvarengai Prado, 1976^{c g}
- Dohrniphora anchicayensis Brown & Kung, 2007^{c g}
- Dohrniphora andersoni Disney, 1990^{c g}
- Dohrniphora angolensis Beyer, 1959^{c g}
- Dohrniphora angularis Borgmeier & Prado, 1975^{c g}
- Dohrniphora anterosetalis Borgmeier & Prado, 1975^{c g}
- Dohrniphora anterospinalis Borgmeier, 1923^{c g}
- Dohrniphora anteroventralis Borgmeier, 1960^{c g}
- Dohrniphora apharea Kung & Brown, 2005^{c g}
- Dohrniphora apicinebula Beyer, 1958^{c g}
- Dohrniphora arcuata Brown & Kung, 2007^{c g}
- Dohrniphora aseta Disney, 2003^{c g}
- Dohrniphora aspinula ^{g}
- Dohrniphora aterpaolii Disney, 2006^{c g}
- Dohrniphora atratula Malloch, 1925^{c g}
- Dohrniphora awarensis Disney, 1990^{c g}
- Dohrniphora barroni Disney, 1990^{c g}
- Dohrniphora beaveri Disney, 1990^{c g}
- Dohrniphora belyaevae Mostovski, 2000^{c g}
- Dohrniphora bicostula Kung & Brown, 2005^{c g}
- Dohrniphora bilineata Borgmeier, 1961^{c g}
- Dohrniphora binga Disney, 1991^{c g}
- Dohrniphora biseriata Borgmeier, 1960^{c g}
- Dohrniphora bisetalis Borgmeier, 1923^{c g}
- Dohrniphora bispinosa Borgmeier & Prado, 1975^{c g}
- Dohrniphora bradburyi Disney, 1990^{c g}
- Dohrniphora brasiliensis Borgmeier, 1922^{c g}
- Dohrniphora broadheadi Disney, 1983^{c g}
- Dohrniphora brunnea Borgmeier, 1960^{c g}
- Dohrniphora brunneifrons Brown & Kung, 2007^{c g}
- Dohrniphora buscki Malloch, 1912^{c g}
- Dohrniphora caini Disney, 1990^{c g}
- Dohrniphora calvaria Borgmeier & Prado, 1975^{c g}
- Dohrniphora cambuquira Borgmeier, 1960^{c g}
- Dohrniphora canaliculata Borgmeier, 1960^{c g}
- Dohrniphora capillaris ^{g}
- Dohrniphora carinata ^{g}
- Dohrniphora castaneicoxa Borgmeier, 1960^{i c g}
- Dohrniphora caverna Disney, 1995^{c g}
- Dohrniphora cavifemur Borgmeier, 1969^{c g}
- Dohrniphora cerdai Brown & Kung, 2007^{c g}
- Dohrniphora cespitula ^{g}
- Dohrniphora circularis Brown & Kung, 2007^{c g}
- Dohrniphora circumflexa Borgmeier, 1960^{c g}
- Dohrniphora clariloba Brown & Kung, 2007^{c g}
- Dohrniphora cocaensis Brown & Kung, 2007^{c g}
- Dohrniphora cognata Borgmeier, 1960^{c g}
- Dohrniphora comptoni Disney, 1990^{c g}
- Dohrniphora confusa Disney, 2003^{c g}
- Dohrniphora conica Borgmeier, 1960^{c g}
- Dohrniphora conlanorum Kung & Brown, 2005^{c g}
- Dohrniphora consimilis Brown & Kung, 2007^{c g}
- Dohrniphora cootei Brown & Kung, 2007^{c g}
- Dohrniphora cornuta (Bigot, 1857)^{i c g}
- Dohrniphora correlata Borgmeier, 1932^{c g}
- Dohrniphora curticerca Brown & Kung, 2007^{c g}
- Dohrniphora curvispinosa Borgmeier, 1923^{c g}
- Dohrniphora decrescens Brown & Kung, 2007^{c g}
- Dohrniphora densilinearis Yang & Liu^{g}
- Dohrniphora denticulata Borgmeier, 1960^{c g}
- Dohrniphora dentifemur Brown & Kung, 2007^{c g}
- Dohrniphora dentiretusa ^{g}
- Dohrniphora diaspora Brown & Kung, 2007^{c g}
- Dohrniphora didyma Brown & Kung, 2007^{c g}
- Dohrniphora digitata Brown & Kung, 2007^{c g}
- Dohrniphora dilatata ^{g}
- Dohrniphora diminuens (Schmitz, 1935)^{c g}
- Dohrniphora diplocantha Borgmeier, 1960^{c g}
- Dohrniphora disneyi Mostovski, 2000^{c g}
- Dohrniphora dispar Enderlein, 1912^{c g}
- Dohrniphora disparilis ^{g}
- Dohrniphora divaricata (Aldrich, 1896)^{i c g}
- Dohrniphora dohrni Dahl, 1898^{c g}
- Dohrniphora ecitophila Borgmeier, 1960^{c g}
- Dohrniphora eilogoensis Disney, 1990^{c g}
- Dohrniphora eminens Borgmeier, 1960^{c g}
- Dohrniphora emmesta Brown & Kung, 2007^{c g}
- Dohrniphora erugata Brown & Kung, 2007^{c g}
- Dohrniphora feeneri Brown & Kung, 2007^{c g}
- Dohrniphora femoralis Borgmeier, 1960^{c g}
- Dohrniphora fijiensis Disney, 1990^{c g}
- Dohrniphora filaris Borgmeier & Prado, 1975^{c g}
- Dohrniphora fisheri Disney, 1990^{c g}
- Dohrniphora foveolata Borgmeier, 1960^{c g}
- Dohrniphora fraudans (Beyer, 1959)^{c g}
- Dohrniphora fuscicoxa Borgmeier, 1923^{c g}
- Dohrniphora gaimarii Brown & Kung, 2007^{c g}
- Dohrniphora geetae (Disney, 2001)^{c g}
- Dohrniphora georgei Disney, 1990^{c g}
- Dohrniphora gigantea Enderlein, 1924^{c g}
- Dohrniphora gilberti Disney, 1990^{c g}
- Dohrniphora goodwini Disney, 1990^{c g}
- Dohrniphora gouteuxi Disney, 2003^{c g}
- Dohrniphora gravis Borgmeier & Prado, 1975^{c g}
- Dohrniphora greeni Disney, 2005^{c g}
- Dohrniphora grootaerti Disney, 1990^{c g}
- Dohrniphora hamartia Brown & Kung, 2007^{c g}
- Dohrniphora hararensis Disney, 2003^{c g}
- Dohrniphora harteni Disney, 2003^{c g}
- Dohrniphora harveyi Disney, 1990^{c g}
- Dohrniphora heptacantha Borgmeier, 1923^{c g}
- Dohrniphora hostilis Borgmeier & Prado, 1975^{c g}
- Dohrniphora ignobilis Borgmeier, 1960^{c g}
- Dohrniphora incisuralis (Loew, 1896)^{i c g b}
- Dohrniphora incomitata Brown & Kung, 2007^{c g}
- Dohrniphora indiae Disney, 2001^{c g}
- Dohrniphora infrequens ^{g}
- Dohrniphora inornata Brown & Kung, 2007^{c g}
- Dohrniphora insulana Liu, 2001^{c g}
- Dohrniphora intrusa Borgmeier, 1923^{c g}
- Dohrniphora intumescens Liu, 2001^{c g}
- Dohrniphora inutilis Borgmeier & Prado, 1975^{c g}
- Dohrniphora irawanensis Disney, 1990^{c g}
- Dohrniphora irregularis Borgmeier & Prado, 1975^{c g}
- Dohrniphora ismayi Disney, 1990^{c g}
- Dohrniphora isopterorum Disney & Darlington, 2000^{c g}
- Dohrniphora ivoriensis Disney, 2003^{c g}
- Dohrniphora kalyakini Mostovski, 2000^{c g}
- Dohrniphora kistneri Disney, 1990^{c g}
- Dohrniphora kleini Brown & Kung, 2007^{c g}
- Dohrniphora knabi Malloch, 1912^{c g}
- Dohrniphora koehleri Brown & Kung, 2007^{c g}
- Dohrniphora lacunosa Brown & Kung, 2007^{c g}
- Dohrniphora lamella Borgmeier & Prado, 1975^{c g}
- Dohrniphora lamellifera Borgmeier, 1961^{c g}
- Dohrniphora leei Disney, 2005^{c g}
- Dohrniphora lobata Borgmeier, 1960^{c g}
- Dohrniphora longirostrata (Enderlein, 1912)^{c g}
- Dohrniphora longisetalis ^{g}
- Dohrniphora lugens Borgmeier, 1960^{c g}
- Dohrniphora luteicincta Borgmeier, 1960^{c g}
- Dohrniphora luteifrons Borgmeier, 1923^{c g}
- Dohrniphora maculipes Borgmeier, 1925^{c g}
- Dohrniphora maddisoni Disney, 1990^{c g}
- Dohrniphora malawiensis Disney, 2003^{c g}
- Dohrniphora malaysiae Green, 1997^{c g}
- Dohrniphora membranea Brown & Kung, 2007^{c g}
- Dohrniphora meridionalis Brues, 1911^{c g}
- Dohrniphora mesofemoralis Brown & Kung, 2007^{c g}
- Dohrniphora metatarsalis Borgmeier & Prado, 1975^{c g}
- Dohrniphora microlobata Brown & Kung, 2007^{c g}
- Dohrniphora microtrichina ^{g}
- Dohrniphora minerva Borgmeier, 1961^{c g}
- Dohrniphora mississippiensis Khalaf, 1971^{i c g}
- Dohrniphora modesta Disney & Mikhailovskaya, 2000^{c g}
- Dohrniphora monochaeta Borgmeier, 1961^{c g}
- Dohrniphora montana Disney, 2003^{c g}
- Dohrniphora monticola Borgmeier, 1925^{c g}
- Dohrniphora morio Schmitz, 1927^{c g}
- Dohrniphora myersi Brues, 1932^{c g}
- Dohrniphora nepalensis Borgmeier, 1961^{c g}
- Dohrniphora nigra Borgmeier & Prado, 1975^{c g}
- Dohrniphora nitida Malloch, 1912^{c g}
- Dohrniphora obscuriventris Borgmeier, 1925^{c g}
- Dohrniphora oricilla Kung & Brown, 2005^{c g}
- Dohrniphora orientalis Schiner, 1868^{c g}
- Dohrniphora ovibarba Brown & Kung, 2007^{c g}
- Dohrniphora palawanensis Disney, 1990^{c g}
- Dohrniphora pallidens Borgmeier & Prado, 1975^{c g}
- Dohrniphora palpalis Borgmeier, 1961^{c g}
- Dohrniphora paolii Schmitz, 1928^{c g}
- Dohrniphora papei Brown & Kung, 2007^{c g}
- Dohrniphora papuana Brues, 1905^{c g}
- Dohrniphora paraguayana Brues, 1907^{c g}
- Dohrniphora paralobata Brown & Kung, 2007^{c g}
- Dohrniphora parvidentata Brown & Kung, 2007^{c g}
- Dohrniphora patawaensis Brown & Kung, 2007^{c g}
- Dohrniphora penai Brown & Kung, 2007^{c g}
- Dohrniphora penicillata Borgmeier, 1960^{c g}
- Dohrniphora perdita Borgmeier & Prado, 1975^{c g}
- Dohrniphora perpendicularis Kung & Brown, 2005^{c g}
- Dohrniphora perplexa (Brues, 1903)^{i c g}
- Dohrniphora pickeringi Brown & Kung, 2007^{c g}
- Dohrniphora pirirostris Borgmeier, 1960^{c g}
- Dohrniphora plaumanni Borgmeier, 1960^{c g}
- Dohrniphora polleti Brown & Kung, 2007^{c g}
- Dohrniphora polyspinosa Disney, 1990^{c g}
- Dohrniphora praedator Borgmeier & Prado, 1975^{c g}
- Dohrniphora prescherweberae Liu, 2001^{c g}
- Dohrniphora proboliana Brown & Kung, 2007^{c g}
- Dohrniphora procera Borgmeier, 1960^{c g}
- Dohrniphora projecta Disney, 1990^{c g}
- Dohrniphora protensa Brown, 2008^{c g}
- Dohrniphora proxima ^{g}
- Dohrniphora pyricornis Brues, 1944^{c g}
- Dohrniphora qinnica Liu, 2001^{c g}
- Dohrniphora rachelae Disney, 1983^{c g}
- Dohrniphora rafaeli Brown & Kung, 2007^{c g}
- Dohrniphora rainbowi Disney, 1990^{c g}
- Dohrniphora rectangularis ^{g}
- Dohrniphora rectilinearis Liu, 2001^{c g}
- Dohrniphora recurvata Borgmeier, 1960^{c g}
- Dohrniphora rhinotermitis Schmitz & Mjoberg, 1924^{c g}
- Dohrniphora rhynchophora Beyer, 1960^{c g}
- Dohrniphora rostrata (Enderlein, 1912)^{c g}
- Dohrniphora sarmientoi Brown & Kung, 2007^{c g}
- Dohrniphora schmitzi Kohl, 1915^{c g}
- Dohrniphora schroederi Schmitz, 1923^{c g}
- Dohrniphora scutellaris Borgmeier, 1960^{c g}
- Dohrniphora sensibilis Borgmeier & Prado, 1975^{c g}
- Dohrniphora separata ^{g}
- Dohrniphora seriata Kung & Brown, 2006
- Dohrniphora setitibia Malloch, 1925^{c g}
- Dohrniphora setulipalpis Liu, 2001^{c g}
- Dohrniphora sexspinosa Kung & Brown, 2006
- Dohrniphora shannoni Borgmeier, 1961^{c g}
- Dohrniphora sharkeyi Brown & Kung, 2007^{c g}
- Dohrniphora signata Borgmeier, 1967^{c g}
- Dohrniphora simplex Borgmeier & Prado, 1975^{c g}
- Dohrniphora sinaloensis Brown & Kung, 2007^{c g}
- Dohrniphora sinepigra Brown & Kung, 2007^{c g}
- Dohrniphora sinopi Prado, 1976^{c g}
- Dohrniphora sinufemorea Schmitz, 1942^{c g}
- Dohrniphora sinuosa Borgmeier, 1960^{c g}
- Dohrniphora smithi Brown & Kung, 2007^{c g}
- Dohrniphora solomonis Borgmeier, 1961^{c g}
- Dohrniphora sorora Disney, 2006
- Dohrniphora spriggsi Disney, 1990^{c g}
- Dohrniphora stenobasalis Brown & Kung, 2007^{c g}
- Dohrniphora stuckenbergi Disney, 2003^{c g}
- Dohrniphora subsulcata Borgmeier & Prado, 1975^{c g}
- Dohrniphora sulcatula Borgmeier, 1960^{c g}
- Dohrniphora tarsalis Borgmeier, 1969^{c g}
- Dohrniphora taylori Disney, 1990^{c g}
- Dohrniphora thailandensis Disney, 2006
- Dohrniphora townesi Brown & Kung, 2007^{c g}
- Dohrniphora transformata Schmitz, 1915^{c g}
- Dohrniphora transversa Brown & Kung, 2007^{c g}
- Dohrniphora triangula ^{g}
- Dohrniphora trigonae Disney, 1995^{c g}
- Dohrniphora trudiae Disney, 1983^{c g}
- Dohrniphora utriensis Brown & Kung, 2007^{c g}
- Dohrniphora ventralis Borgmeier & Prado, 1975^{c g}
- Dohrniphora vexans Borgmeier & Prado, 1975^{c g}
- Dohrniphora vorax Schmitz, 1915^{c g}
- Dohrniphora wangae Brown & Kung, 2007^{c g}
- Dohrniphora wilkinsoni Brown & Kung, 2007^{c g}
- Dohrniphora xiei Brown & Kung, 2007^{c g}
- Dohrniphora yasuniensis Brown & Kung, 2007^{c g}
- Dohrniphora zambiae Disney, 2003^{c g}
- Dohrniphora zomerysis Brown & Kung, 2007^{c g}
- Dohrniphora zophera Disney, 2003^{c g}

Data sources: i = ITIS, c = Catalogue of Life, g = GBIF, b = Bugguide.net
