= List of Puliciphora species =

This is a list of 112 species in Puliciphora, a genus of scuttle flies in the family Phoridae.

== Puliciphora species ==
- Puliciphora anceps Schmitz, 1915
- Puliciphora beaveri Disney, 1988
- Puliciphora beckeri Meijere, 1907
- Puliciphora boltoni Disney, 1988
- Puliciphora borinquenensis Wheeler, 1906
- Puliciphora brachymyrmecis (Silvestri, 1911)
- Puliciphora browni Disney, 2020
- Puliciphora cacaulandiae Disney, 2003
- Puliciphora calva Schmitz, 1951
- Puliciphora cloveri (Disney, 1989)
- Puliciphora collinsi Disney, 1988
- Puliciphora convexa Borgmeier, 1960
- Puliciphora coprophila Borgmeier, 1960
- Puliciphora coptotermitum Disney, 1989
- Puliciphora cubensis (Brues, 1932)
- Puliciphora decachete Schmitz, 1958
- Puliciphora destituta Disney, 1999
- Puliciphora ecitophila Disney, 2004
- Puliciphora edaphomyia Disney, 2005
- Puliciphora epichaeta (Borgmeier, 1960)
- Puliciphora etiamodesta Disney, 2005
- Puliciphora exachatina Disney, 1988
- Puliciphora fenestrata Borgmeier, 1960
- Puliciphora flava Malloch, 1914
- Puliciphora fosteri Disney, 1999
- Puliciphora frivola Borgmeier, 1960
- Puliciphora fungicola Yang & Wang, 1993
- Puliciphora glacialis Malloch, 1912
- Puliciphora gracilis Borgmeier, 1960
- Puliciphora grandicoxa Colyer, 1967
- Puliciphora hancocki Disney, 2005
- Puliciphora haplopyga (Borgmeier, 1969)
- Puliciphora haplpyga (Borgmeier, 1969)
- Puliciphora hirta (Schmitz, 1951)
- Puliciphora ibadanensis Disney, 2002
- Puliciphora imbecilla Borgmeier, 1960
- Puliciphora imitata Disney, 2008
- Puliciphora interrupta Borgmeier, 1960
- Puliciphora jacobsoni Schmitz, 1925
- Puliciphora jacobsonorum Disney, 1989
- Puliciphora jacquemarti Disney, 2005
- Puliciphora jeanssoni (Trägårdh, 1909)
- Puliciphora karensis Disney, 1998
- Puliciphora kerteszi Brues, 1911
- Puliciphora kistneri Disney, 1998
- Puliciphora knighti Disney, 1988
- Puliciphora koghiensis Disney, 2003
- Puliciphora laranjae Disney, 2003
- Puliciphora legionis Borgmeier, 1960
- Puliciphora longipes Schmitz & Mjoberg, 1925
- Puliciphora longitergum Disney, 2003
- Puliciphora lucifera Dahl, 1897
- Puliciphora lunaris Borgmeier, 1960
- Puliciphora macrolunarum Disney, 2003
- Puliciphora malae Disney, 1990
- Puliciphora malaysiae Disney, 1988
- Puliciphora matheranensis Brues, 1907
- Puliciphora melanis Schmitz, 1951
- Puliciphora meneghettii Schmitz, 1951
- Puliciphora mexicanae Disney, 2003
- Puliciphora microphthalma Schmitz & Mjoberg, 1924
- Puliciphora modesta (Borgmeier, 1960)
- Puliciphora myrmecophila Brues, 1925
- Puliciphora nigeriae Disney, 2002
- Puliciphora nigroflava (Borgmeier, 1958)
- Puliciphora nudipalpis Malloch, 1912
- Puliciphora nuttingi Disney, 1998
- Puliciphora obtecta Meijere, 1912
- Puliciphora occidentalis (Melander and Brues, 1903)
- Puliciphora omnivora Mikhailovskaya, 1993
- Puliciphora opuntiae Paulian, 1950
- Puliciphora pallicauda Schmitz, 1934
- Puliciphora papillata Borgmeier, 1960
- Puliciphora parsetosa Disney, 2003
- Puliciphora parvula Borgmeier, 1969
- Puliciphora parvulunarum Disney, 2002
- Puliciphora pauxilla (Borgmeier, 1960)
- Puliciphora penangensis Disney, 1988
- Puliciphora placida Borgmeier, 1960
- Puliciphora profana Borgmeier, 1960
- Puliciphora puerilis (Becker, 1908)
- Puliciphora pulex Dahl, 1898
- Puliciphora pygmaea (Borgmeier, 1960)
- Puliciphora qianana Yang & Wang, 1993
- Puliciphora rata Borgmeier, 1960
- Puliciphora reevesi Disney, 2003
- Puliciphora rhodesiana Schmitz, 1934
- Puliciphora rosei Disney, 1988
- Puliciphora rufipes Silva Figueroa, 1916
- Puliciphora russellsmithi Disney, 2002
- Puliciphora secosexergum Disney, 2008
- Puliciphora sedecimsetarum Schmitz, 1958 1916
- Puliciphora semicimex (Schmitz, 1951)
- Puliciphora seriata Borgmeier, 1960
- Puliciphora setosa Borgmeier, 1960
- Puliciphora sobria Borgmeier, 1960
- Puliciphora spirapenis Disney & Mikhailovskaya, 2001
- Puliciphora stuckenbergi Disney, 1988
- Puliciphora suavis Borgmeier, 1963
- Puliciphora subconvexa Borgmeier, 1960
- Puliciphora sulcimanae Disney, 1998
- Puliciphora sumatrae Disney, 1999
- Puliciphora sylvatica Brues, 1909
- Puliciphora taigae Disney & Mikhailovskaya, 2001
- Puliciphora tambopata Disney, 1989
- Puliciphora termitum Schmitz, 1926
- Puliciphora togata Schmitz, 1925
- Puliciphora tokyoensis Kinoshita, 1918
- Puliciphora triangularis (Borgmeier, 1960)
- Puliciphora trisclerita Senior-White, 1924
- Puliciphora velocipes (Schmitz, 1913)
- Puliciphora vicinalis Borgmeier, 1960
- Puliciphora viklundi Disney, 2003
- Puliciphora virginiensis Malloch, 1912
