= Chonocephalus =

Scientific classification
- Kingdom: Animalia
- Phylum: Arthropoda
- Class: Insecta
- Order: Diptera
- Family: Phoridae
- Subfamily: Metopininae
- Tribe: Metopinini
- Genus: Chonocephalus; Wandolleck, 1898

Type species
- Chonocephalus dorsalis Wandolleck, 1898

Synonyms
- Epichonocephalus Schmitz, 1927; Heterophora Santos Abreu, 1921

Genus of flies

Chonocephalus is a genus of flies in the family Phoridae.

== Species ==
- C. aduncus Schmitz, 1928
- C. alzadae Disney, 2008
- C. americanus Borgmeier, 1963
- C. anomalus Borgmeier & Prado, 1975
- C. aripoensis Disney, 1995
- C. assimilis Borgmeier & Prado, 1975
- C. bentacaisei Santos Abreu & Schmitz, 1934
- C. bispinosus Borgmeier, 1967
- C. blackithorum Disney, 1986
- C. brisbanensis Beyer, 1960
- C. browni Disney, 2008
- C. buccatus Malloch, 1912
- C. cautus Disney, 2005
- C. chiriquiensis Disney, 2008
- C. collini Disney, 2002
- C. comptoni Disney, 2008
- C. cummingae Disney, 2005
- C. dahli Schmitz, 1928
- C. depressus Meijere, 1912
- C. digitalis Borgmeier, 1967
- C. dilatospinae Disney, 2008
- C. dimakae Paulian, 1958
- C. dimidiatus Borgmeier, 1967
- C. dominicanus Borgmeier, 1967
- C. dorsalis Wandolleck, 1898
- C. ecitophilus Borgmeier & Schmitz, 1923
- C. elongatus Schmitz, 1950
- C. fletcheri Schmitz, 1912
- C. furcatus Borgmeier, 1967
- C. gilli Disney, 2008
- C. globipygus Borgmeier, 1967
- C. heymonsi Stobbe, 1913
- C. hibisci Paulian, 1958
- C. hirsutus Bohart, 1947
- C. jamaicensis Brues, 1915
- C. japonicus Schmitz, 1941
- C. justini Disney, 2005
- C. kiboshoensis Brues, 1907
- C. kreuterae Disney, 2008
- C. kungae Disney, 2008
- C. laetus Borgmeier, 1963
- C. leei Disney, 2008
- C. longicornis Disney, 2008
- C. macuiensis Disney, 2008
- C. madagascariensis Paulian, 1958
- C. major Schmitz, 1928
- C. marginatus Disney, 2002
- C. mexicanus Silvestri, 1911
- C. modestus Disney, 2005
- C. murallaensis Disney, 2008
- C. necdepressus Disney, 2008
- C. olanchoensis Disney, 2008
- C. pallidulus Beyer, 1964
- C. palposus Schmitz, 1928
- C. pedalis Borgmeier, 1967
- C. primus Schmitz, 1928
- C. pudicus Disney, 2005
- C. punctifascia Borgmeier, 1935
- C. quartus Schmitz, 1928
- C. raposoensis Disney, 2008
- C. rostamani Disney, 2004
- C. secundus Schmitz, 1928
- C. similis Brues, 1905
- C. simiolus Beyer, 1964
- C. simplex Schmitz, 1928
- C. steineri Disney, 2005
- C. subglaber Bohart, 1947
- C. tertius Schmitz, 1928
- C. townesi Disney, 2008
- C. vadoni Paulian, 1958
- C. vitiodepressus Disney, 2008
- C. wirthorum Disney, 1980
