= Phalacrotophora epeirae =

Scientific classification
- Kingdom: Animalia
- Phylum: Arthropoda
- Class: Insecta
- Order: Diptera
- Family: Phoridae
- Subfamily: Metopininae
- Tribe: Metopinini
- Genus: Phalacrotophora
- Species: P. epeirae

Binomial name
- Phalacrotophora epeirae (Brues, 1902)

Synonyms
- Phora epeirae Brues, 1902

Species of fly

Phalacrotophora epeirae is a species of scuttle flies (insects in the family Phoridae).
