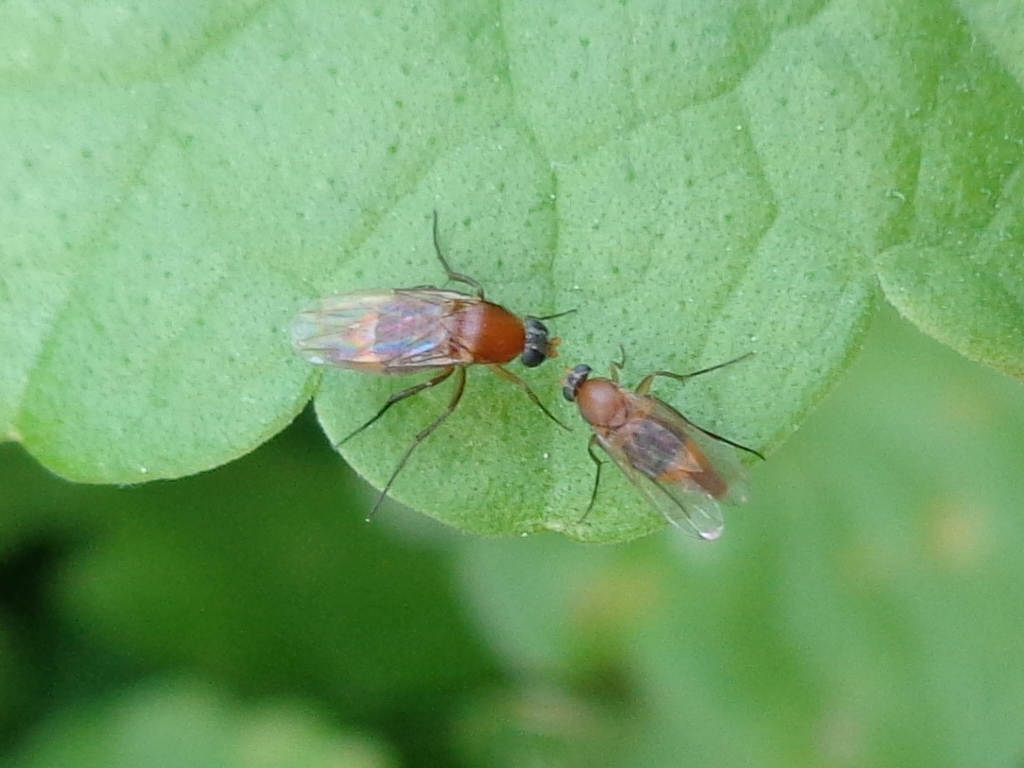

Scientific classification
- Kingdom: Animalia
- Phylum: Arthropoda
- Clade: Pancrustacea
- Class: Insecta
- Order: Diptera
- Family: Phoridae
- Subfamily: Metopininae
- Tribe: Metopinini
- Genus: Phalacrotophora; Enderlein, 1912

Type species
- Phalacrotophora bruesiana Enderlein, 1912

= Phalacrotophora =

Genus of flies

Phalacrotophora is a genus of scuttle flies (insects in the family Phoridae). There are at least 50 described species in Phalacrotophora.

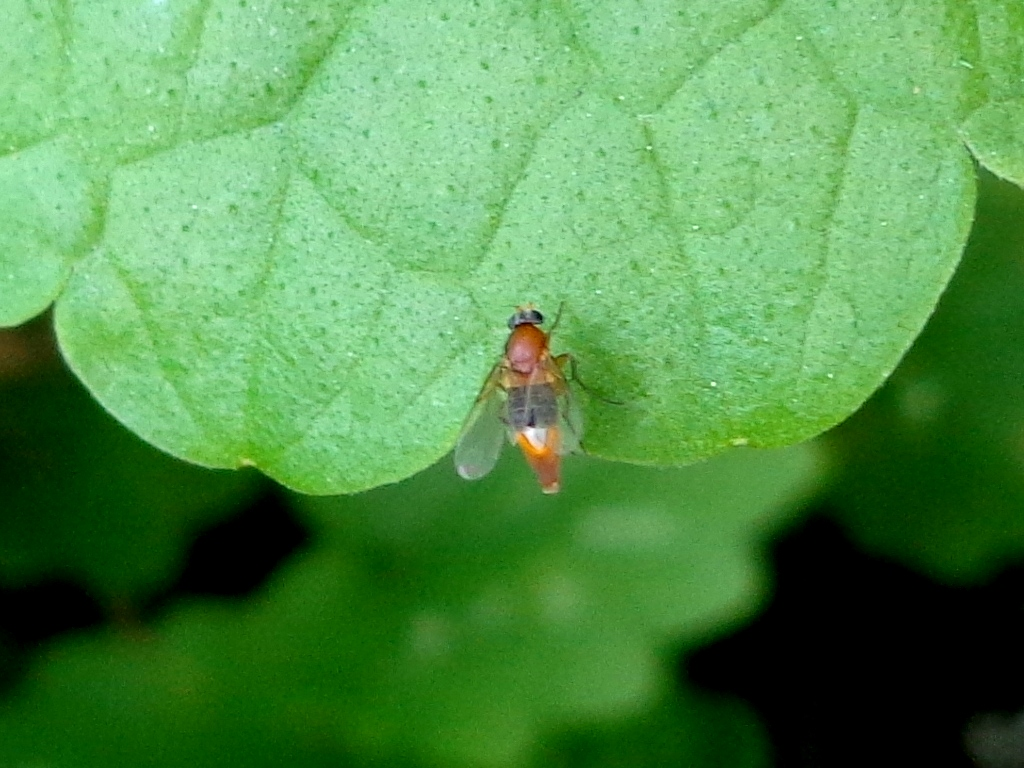

== Species ==
These 57 species belong to the genus Phalacrotophora:

- Phalacrotophora amplectens Borgmeier, 1961
- Phalacrotophora appendicigera Borgmeier, 1924
- Phalacrotophora auranticolor Schmitz, 1932
- Phalacrotophora berolinensis Schmitz, 1920
- Phalacrotophora beuki Disney, 1997
- Phalacrotophora boliviana Borgmeier, 1971
- Phalacrotophora braunsi (Brues, 1907)
- Phalacrotophora bruesiana Enderlein, 1912
- Phalacrotophora brunnescens Borgmeier, 1961
- Phalacrotophora decimaculata Liu, 2001
- Phalacrotophora delageae Disney, 1979
- Phalacrotophora epeirae (Brues, 1902)
- Phalacrotophora fasciata (Fallén, 1823)
- Phalacrotophora fimbriiterga Beyer, 1966
- Phalacrotophora flaviclava (Brues, 1911)
- Phalacrotophora flexivena Borgmeier, 1961
- Phalacrotophora gigantea Beyer, 1966
- Phalacrotophora gressitti Beyer, 1966
- Phalacrotophora halictorum (Melander and Brues, 1903)
- Phalacrotophora indiana Colyer, 1961
- Phalacrotophora irregularis Brues, 1936
- Phalacrotophora jacobsoni Brues, 1915
- Phalacrotophora longifrons (Brues, 1906)
- Phalacrotophora luteifascia Borgmeier, 1934
- Phalacrotophora maculiterga Beyer, 1958
- Phalacrotophora magnifica Borgmeier, 1962
- Phalacrotophora marginata (Brunetti, 1912)
- Phalacrotophora nedae (Malloch, 1912)
- Phalacrotophora neotropica Borgmeier, 1923
- Phalacrotophora netropica Borgmeier, 1971
- Phalacrotophora nigrita Schmitz, 1932
- Phalacrotophora nitida Lengyel, 2011
- Phalacrotophora oudemansi Schmitz, 1932
- Phalacrotophora pallidicornis Brues, 1936
- Phalacrotophora pappi Lengyel, 2011
- Phalacrotophora paradoxa Schmitz, 1949
- Phalacrotophora perlonga Beyer, 1966
- Phalacrotophora petropolitana Borgmeier, 1925
- Phalacrotophora philaxyridis Disney, 1997
- Phalacrotophora pictofasciata Schmitz, 1919
- Phalacrotophora pilipes Borgmeier, 1934
- Phalacrotophora proclinans Beyer, 1965
- Phalacrotophora pruinosa Borgmeier, 1934
- Phalacrotophora puncifrons Brues, 24 g
- Phalacrotophora punctiapex Borgmeier, 1961
- Phalacrotophora punctifrons Brues, 1924
- Phalacrotophora quadrimaculata Schmitz, 1926
- Phalacrotophora quardrimaculata Schmitz, 1926
- Phalacrotophora rufiventris Borgmeier, 1971
- Phalacrotophora scutata Brues, 1936
- Phalacrotophora spectabilis Schmitz, 1925
- Phalacrotophora subnigrita Beyer, 1965
- Phalacrotophora tesselata Borgmeier, 1971
- Phalacrotophora triciliata Borgmeier, 1967
- Phalacrotophora triguttata Beyer, 1965
- Phalacrotophora vernicea Beyer, 1966
- Phalacrotophora vittipennis Schmitz, 1932
