= Acontistoptera =

Scientific classification
- Domain: Eukaryota
- Kingdom: Animalia
- Phylum: Arthropoda
- Class: Insecta
- Order: Diptera
- Family: Phoridae
- Subfamily: Metopininae
- Tribe: Metopinini
- Genus: Acontistoptera; Brues, 1902

Type species
- Acontistoptera melanderi Brues, 1902

Genus of flies

Acontistoptera is a genus of flies in the family Phoridae.

== Species ==
- A. brasiliensis Schmitz, 1914
- A. hirsuta Borgmeier, 1925
- A. melanderi Brues, 1902
- A. mexicana Malloch, 1912
