= Xanionotum =

Scientific classification
- Domain: Eukaryota
- Kingdom: Animalia
- Phylum: Arthropoda
- Class: Insecta
- Order: Diptera
- Family: Phoridae
- Subfamily: Metopininae
- Tribe: Metopinini
- Genus: Xanionotum; Brues, 1902

Type species
- Xanionotum hystrix Brues, 1902

Synonyms
- Xainonotum Aldrich, 1905 (Missp.); Schmitzia Borgmeier, 1923; Schmitziphora Borgmeier, 1923; Ecitocantha Borgmeier, 1924; Aristopsis Borgmeier, 1959

Genus of flies

Xanionotum is a genus of flies in the family Phoridae.

== Species ==
- X. bruchi (Borgmeier, 1924)
- X. delicatum (Borgmeier, 1926)
- X. hystrix Brues, 1902
- X. mexicanum Borgmeier, 1932
- X. nechystrix Disney, 2007
- X. pilosum Borgmeier, 1932
- X. scopifer Borgmeier, 1938
- X. setulitibia Borgmeier, 1938
- X. smithi Brues, 1936
- X. sociatum Borgmeier, 1928
- X. spiniceps (Borgmeier, 1923)
- X. spinipes Borgmeier, 1928
- X. spinosior (Borgmeier, 1926)
- X. tarsale Borgmeier, 1968
- X. wasmanni Schmitz, 1928
