= Phalacrotophora longifrons =

Scientific classification
- Kingdom: Animalia
- Phylum: Arthropoda
- Class: Insecta
- Order: Diptera
- Family: Phoridae
- Subfamily: Metopininae
- Tribe: Metopinini
- Genus: Phalacrotophora
- Species: P. longifrons

Binomial name
- Phalacrotophora longifrons (Brues, 1906)

Synonyms
- Aphiochaeta longifrons Brues, 1906

Species of fly

Phalacrotophora longifrons is a species of scuttle flies (insects in the family Phoridae).
