= Syneura =

Scientific classification
- Kingdom: Animalia
- Phylum: Arthropoda
- Class: Insecta
- Order: Diptera
- Family: Phoridae
- Subfamily: Metopininae
- Tribe: Metopinini
- Genus: Syneura; Brues, 1903

Type species
- Phora cocciphila Coquillett, 1895

Genus of flies

Syneura is a genus of flies in the family Phoridae.

== Species ==
- S. cocciphila (Coquillett, 1895)
- S. digitalis Borgmeier, 1925
- S. diversicolor Borgmeier, 1923
- S. edwardsi Schmitz, 1929
- S. furcellata Borgmeier, 1924
- S. infraposita Borgmeier & Schmitz, 1923
- S. longipennis Borgmeier, 1935
- S. luciola Borgmeier, 1925
- S. semifurcata Prado, 1976
- S. subsetosa Borgmeier, 1971
- S. williamsi Borgmeier, 1971
