= Cataclinusa =

Scientific classification
- Domain: Eukaryota
- Kingdom: Animalia
- Phylum: Arthropoda
- Class: Insecta
- Order: Diptera
- Family: Phoridae
- Subfamily: Metopininae
- Tribe: Metopinini
- Genus: Cataclinusa; Schmitz, 1927

Type species
- Cataclinusa bucki Schmitz, 1927

Genus of flies

Cataclinusa is a genus of flies in the family Phoridae.

== Species ==
- C. bucki Schmitz, 1927
- C. pachycondylae (Brues, 1904)
