= Diocophora =

Scientific classification
- Domain: Eukaryota
- Kingdom: Animalia
- Phylum: Arthropoda
- Class: Insecta
- Order: Diptera
- Family: Phoridae
- Subfamily: Metopininae
- Tribe: Metopinini
- Genus: Diocophora; Borgmeier, 1959

Type species
- Diocophora disparifrons Borgmeier, 1959

Genus of flies

Diocophora is a genus of flies in the family Phoridae.

== Species ==
- D. appretiata (Schmitz, 1923)
- D. armigera (Borgmeier, 1925)
- D. assimilata (Borgmeier, 1925)
- D. commutata (Borgmeier, 1925)
- D. disparifrons Borgmeier, 1959
- D. duplexseta Disney, 2008
- D. longichaeta Disney, 2007
- D. modesta Borgmeier, 1959
- D. multichaeta Brown & Disney, 2009
- D. multichaeta Disney, 2007
- D. palpalis Borgmeier, 1963
- D. praedasicara Disney, 2007
- D. spinifemorata (Malloch, 1912)
- D. spiniventris (Borgmeier, 1925)
- D. trichogaster Borgmeier, 1963
