= Beckerina =

Scientific classification
- Domain: Eukaryota
- Kingdom: Animalia
- Phylum: Arthropoda
- Class: Insecta
- Order: Diptera
- Family: Phoridae
- Subfamily: Metopininae
- Tribe: Beckerinini
- Genus: Beckerina; Malloch, 1910

Type species
- Phora umbrimargo Becker, 1901

Genus of flies

Beckerina is a genus of flies in the family Phoridae.

== Species ==
- B. aequatoriana Borgmeier & Prado, 1975
- B. aliena Malloch, 1924
- B. burmicola Beyer, 1958
- B. chelifera Borgmeier, 1923
- B. costaricana Borgmeier, 1932
- B. dactylata Borgmeier, 1969
- B. dominicana Borgmeier, 1969
- B. irregularis Borgmeier, 1925
- B. lehmanni Enderlein, 1927
- B. luteihalterata Borgmeier, 1925
- B. luteola Malloch, 1919
- B. neotropica Brues, 1919
- B. nudipleura Borgmeier, 1925
- B. pilipleura Borgmeier, 1971
- B. polysticha Schmitz, 1939
- B. setifrons Borgmeier, 1969
- B. similata Malloch, 1923
- B. umbrimargo (Becker, 1901)
