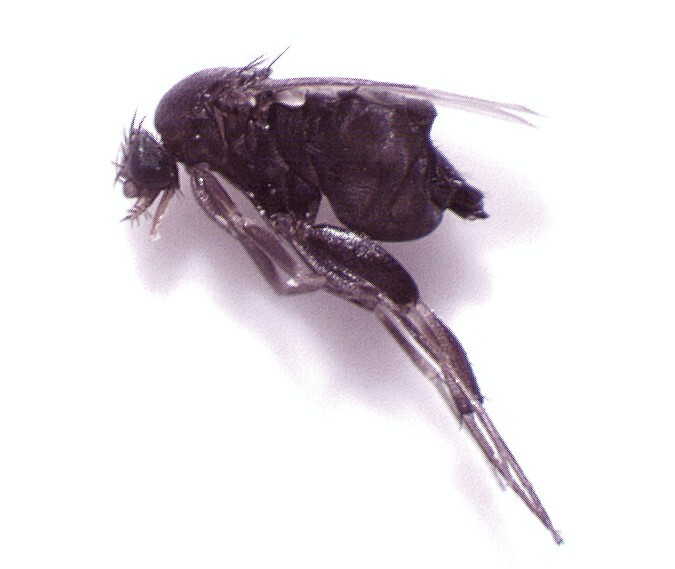

Scientific classification
- Kingdom: Animalia
- Phylum: Arthropoda
- Clade: Pancrustacea
- Class: Insecta
- Order: Diptera
- Family: Phoridae
- Subfamily: Metopininae
- Tribe: Metopinini
- Genus: Rhyncophoromyia; Malloch, 1923

Type species
- Rhyncophoromyia trivittata Malloch, 1923

Synonyms
- Ryncophoromyia Schmitz, 1929

= Rhyncophoromyia =

Genus of flies

Rhyncophoromyia is a genus of flies in the family Phoridae.

== Species ==
- R. calvipalpis (Borgmeier, 1967)
- R. conica (Malloch, 1912)
- R. diversa Prado, 1976
- R. gymnopleura Borgmeier, 1926
- R. laticosta Borgmeier, 1959
- R. maculineura Borgmeier, 1959
- R. nearctica Borgmeier, 1963
- R. nubilifurca Borgmeier, 1969
- R. proboscidea (Malloch, 1912)
- R. spinipleura Borgmeier, 1959
- R. trivittata Malloch, 1923
- R. umbrosa Borgmeier, 1959
