= Brownphora =

Scientific classification
- Domain: Eukaryota
- Kingdom: Animalia
- Phylum: Arthropoda
- Class: Insecta
- Order: Diptera
- Family: Phoridae
- Subfamily: Metopininae
- Genus: Brownphora; Disney, 2004

Type species
- Beckerina sinefurca Borgmeier, 1969

Genus of flies

Brownphora is a genus of flies in the family Phoridae.

== Species ==
- Brownphora sinefurca (Borgmeier, 1969)
