= Menozziola =

Scientific classification
- Kingdom: Animalia
- Phylum: Arthropoda
- Class: Insecta
- Order: Diptera
- Family: Phoridae
- Subfamily: Metopininae
- Tribe: Metopinini
- Genus: Menozziola; Schmitz, 1927

Type species
- Apocephalus schmitzi Menozzi, 1921

Synonyms
- Minozziola Steyskal, 1988; Stylusa Borgmeier & Prado, 1975; Menoziola Schmitz, 1929

Genus of flies

Menozziola is a genus of flies in the family Phoridae.

== Species ==
- M. camponoti Schmitz, 1934
- M. diversipes Borgmeier, 1961
- M. fraterna (Beyer, 1965)
- M. glandularis Borgmeier, 1961
- M. incisipennis (Borgmeier & Prado, 1975)
- M. obscuripes (Schmitz, 1927
- M. recurvata (Borgmeier & Prado, 1975)
- M. schmitzi (Menozzi, 1921)
- M. serialis Schmitz, 1938
- M. sororia (Beyer, 1965)
