= Commoptera =

Scientific classification
- Domain: Eukaryota
- Kingdom: Animalia
- Phylum: Arthropoda
- Class: Insecta
- Order: Diptera
- Family: Phoridae
- Subfamily: Metopininae
- Tribe: Metopinini
- Genus: Commoptera; Brues, 1901

Type species
- Commoptera solenopsidis Brues, 1901

Genus of flies

Commoptera is a genus of flies in the family Phoridae.

== Species ==
- C. affinis Borgmeier, 1928
- C. coeci Borgmeier, 1971
- C. ecitonis Borgmeier, 1926
- C. pygmaea Borgmeier, 1928
- C. setiventris Borgmeier, 1971
- C. solenopsidis Brues, 1901
