= Cremersia (fly) =

Scientific classification
- Domain: Eukaryota
- Kingdom: Animalia
- Phylum: Arthropoda
- Class: Insecta
- Order: Diptera
- Family: Phoridae
- Subfamily: Metopininae
- Tribe: Metopinini
- Genus: Cremersia; Schmitz, 1924

Type species
- Cremersia zikani Schmitz, 1924

Genus of flies

Cremersia is a genus of flies in the family Phoridae.

== Species ==
- C. adunca Borgmeier, 1961
- C. australis Borgmeier, 1928
- C. bifidcauda Disney, 2007
- C. brasiliensis Borgmeier, 1928
- C. costalis Borgmeier, 1925
- C. crassicostalis Disney, 2008
- C. crassispina Borgmeier, 1928
- C. longipes Borgmeier, 1971
- C. pernambucana Borgmeier, 1925
- C. pilipes Borgmeier, 1961
- C. pilosa Borgmeier, 1928
- C. salesiana Borgmeier, 1928
- C. setitarsus Borgmeier, 1971
- C. spinicauda Borgmeier, 1961
- C. spinicosta (Malloch, 1912)
- C. spinosissima Borgmeier, 1925
- C. zikani Schmitz, 1924
