= Physoptera =

Scientific classification
- Domain: Eukaryota
- Kingdom: Animalia
- Phylum: Arthropoda
- Class: Insecta
- Order: Diptera
- Family: Phoridae
- Subfamily: Metopininae
- Tribe: Metopinini
- Genus: Physoptera; Borgmeier, 1958

Type species
- Aphiochaeta vesiculata Borgmeier, 1925

Genus of flies

Physoptera is a genus of flies in the family Phoridae.

== Species ==
- P. apicinebula (Malloch, 1924)
- P. membranosa (Borgmeier, 1925)
- P. parastigmatica Borgmeier, 1966
- P. parvitergata (Borgmeier, 1925)
- P. pictiventris Borgmeier, 1958
- P. pleurospinosa Borgmeier, 1961
- P. poeciloptera Borgmeier, 1958
- P. punctifemur (Enderlein, 1912)
- P. rostralis Borgmeier, 1959
- P. spatiosa Borgmeier, 1958
- P. stigmatica Borgmeier, 1959
- P. tarsata (Brues, 1905)
- P. vesiculata (Borgmeier, 1925)
