= Myriophora =

Scientific classification
- Domain: Eukaryota
- Kingdom: Animalia
- Phylum: Arthropoda
- Class: Insecta
- Order: Diptera
- Superfamily: Platypezoidea
- Family: Phoridae
- Genus: Myriophora; Brown, 1992

Type species
- Myriophora aequaliseta Brown, 1992

Genus of flies

Myriophora is a genus of flies in the family Phoridae.

== Species ==
- M. aequaliseta (Borgmeier, 1963)
- M. alexandrae Hash & Brown, 2015
- M. alienipennis Hash & Brown, 2015
- M. angustifacies Hash & Brown, 2015
- M. annetteae Hash & Brown, 2015
- M. annulata Hash & Brown, 2015
- M. bicuspidis Hash & Brown, 2015
- M. bilsae Hash & Brown, 2015
- M. bimaculata Hash & Brown, 2015
- M. borealis Hash & Brown, 2015
- M. breviatrsus Hash & Brown, 2015
- M. browni Hash, 2015
- M. brunneipleuron Hash & Brown, 2015
- M. communis Hash & Brown, 2015
- M. curvata Hash & Brown, 2015
- M. curvicacumen Hash & Brown, 2015
- M. dennisoni Hash & Brown, 2015
- M. discalis Hash & Brown, 2015
- M. diversa Hash & Brown, 2015
- M. dividida Hash & Brown, 2015
- M. dolionatis Hash & Brown, 2015
- M. flavicosta Hash & Brown, 2015
- M. fuscidorsum Hash & Brown, 2015
- M. gigantea Hash & Brown, 2015
- M. gobaleti Hash & Brown, 2015
- M. harwoodi Hash & Brown, 2015
- M. hebes Hash & Brown, 2015
- M. heratyi Hash & Brown, 2015
- M. inaequalisetarum Hash & Brown, 2015
- M. infirmata Hash & Brown, 2015
- M. jeffersoni Hash & Brown, 2015
- M. juli (Brues, 1908)
- M. kerri Hash & Brown, 2015
- M. kungae Hash & Brown, 2015
- M. longisetarum Hash & Brown, 2015
- M. lucigaster (Borgmeier, 1961)
- M. luteitergum Hash & Brown, 2015
- M. luteizona (Borgmeier, 1925)
- M. magnilabellum Hash & Brown, 2015
- M. misionesensis Hash & Brown, 2015
- M. nigra Hash & Brown, 2015
- M. nigralinea Hash & Brown, 2015
- M. obscuritergum Hash & Brown, 2015
- M. opilionidis (Borgmeier, 1931)
- M. pabloi (Brown, 1994)
- M. pallida Hash & Brown, 2015
- M. parva Hash & Brown, 2015
- M. pectinata Hash & Brown, 2015
- M. perpendicularis Hash & Brown, 2015
- M. plana Hash & Brown, 2015
- M. porrasae Hash & Brown, 2015
- M. porrecta Hash & Brown, 2015
- M. reminatis Hash & Brown, 2015
- M. scopulata Hash & Brown, 2015
- M. simplex Hash & Brown, 2015
- M. sinesplendida Hash & Brown, 2015
- M. smithi Hash & Brown, 2015
- M. spicaphora Hash & Brown, 2015
- M. spicaticonus Hash & Brown, 2015
- M. tenuis Hash & Brown, 2015
- M. uruguaiensis Hash & Brown, 2015
- M. vancouverensis Hash & Brown, 2015
- M. wellsorum Hash & Brown, 2015
