= Acanthophorides =

Scientific classification
- Domain: Eukaryota
- Kingdom: Animalia
- Phylum: Arthropoda
- Class: Insecta
- Order: Diptera
- Family: Phoridae
- Subfamily: Metopininae
- Tribe: Metopinini
- Genus: Acanthophorides; Borgmeier, 1924

Type species
- Acanthophora longicornis Borgmeier, 1923

Synonyms
- Acanthophora Borgmeier, 1923

Genus of flies

Acanthophorides is a genus of flies in the family Phoridae.

== Species ==
- A. clavicercus Borgmeier, 1967
- A. condei Borgmeier, 1928
- A. divergens Borgmeier, 1926
- A. incomptus Schmitz, 1927
- A. labidophilus Borgmeier, 1967
- A. longicornis (Borgmeier, 1923)
- A. pilosicauda Borgmeier, 1967
