= Phymatopterella =

Scientific classification
- Domain: Eukaryota
- Kingdom: Animalia
- Phylum: Arthropoda
- Class: Insecta
- Order: Diptera
- Family: Phoridae
- Subfamily: Metopininae
- Tribe: Metopinini
- Genus: Phymatopterella; Brues, 1933

Type species
- Phymatopterella shannoni Brues, 1933

Genus of flies

Phymatopterella is a genus of flies in the family Phoridae.

== Species ==
- P. pallidifrons Borgmeier, 1926
- P. luteiclava Borgmeier, 1971
- P. ovatimacula Barnes, 1990
- P. pallidifrons (Borgmeier, 1926)
- P. shannoni Brues, 1933
- P. submaculata Borgmeier, 1971
- P. uniseriata Borgmeier, 1971
