= Pericyclocera =

Scientific classification
- Domain: Eukaryota
- Kingdom: Animalia
- Phylum: Arthropoda
- Class: Insecta
- Order: Diptera
- Family: Phoridae
- Subfamily: Metopininae
- Tribe: Metopinini
- Genus: Pericyclocera; Schmitz, 1927

Type species
- Pericyclocera molliventris Schmitz, 1928

Genus of flies

Pericyclocera is a genus of flies in the family Phoridae.

== Species ==
- P. arachnophila Borgmeier, 1931
- P. cata (Melander & Brues, 1903)
- P. diptychogastra Schmitz, 1940
- P. floricola Borgmeier, 1966
- P. graminicola Borgmeier, 1969
- P. javicola Beyer, 1959
- P. maculiventris Borgmeier, 1969
- P. molliventris Schmitz, 1928
- P. parianae Borgmeier, 1969
