= Ecitomyia =

Scientific classification
- Kingdom: Animalia
- Phylum: Arthropoda
- Class: Insecta
- Order: Diptera
- Family: Phoridae
- Subfamily: Metopininae
- Tribe: Metopinini
- Genus: Ecitomyia; Brues, 1901

Type species
- Ecitomyia wheeleri Brues, 1901

Genus of flies

Ecitomyia is a genus of flies in the family Phoridae.

== Species ==
- E. aberrans Borgmeier, 1960
- E. brevipennis Borgmeier, 1960
- E. juxtaposita Borgmeier, 1960
- E. longipennis Borgmeier, 1960
- E. luteola Borgmeier & Schmitz, 1923
- E. manni Brues, 1925
- E. minuscula Borgmeier & Schmitz, 1923
- E. ocellata Borgmeier, 1960
- E. wheeleri Brues, 1901
