= Ecitoptera =

Scientific classification
- Domain: Eukaryota
- Kingdom: Animalia
- Phylum: Arthropoda
- Class: Insecta
- Order: Diptera
- Family: Phoridae
- Subfamily: Metopininae
- Tribe: Metopinini
- Genus: Ecitoptera; Borgmeier & Schmitz, 1923

Type species
- Ecitoptera concomitans Borgmeier & Schmitz, 1923

Genus of flies

Ecitoptera is a genus of flies in the family Phoridae.

== Species ==
- E. centralis Borgmeier, 1960
- E. ciliata Borgmeier, 1923
- E. concomitans Borgmeier & Schmitz, 1923
- E. cordobensis Borgmeier, 1925
- E. humeralis Borgmeier, 1960
- E. maculifrons Borgmeier, 1924
- E. maior Schmitz, 1924
- E. microps Borgmeier, 1960
- E. parallela Borgmeier, 1960
- E. proboscidalis Borgmeier, 1924
- E. schmitzi Borgmeier, 1923
- E. subciliata Borgmeier, 1960
- E. truncatipennis Borgmeier, 1960
- E. watkinsi Disney, 1998
