= Metopina =

Scientific classification
- Domain: Eukaryota
- Kingdom: Animalia
- Phylum: Arthropoda
- Class: Insecta
- Order: Diptera
- Family: Phoridae
- Subfamily: Metopininae
- Tribe: Metopinini
- Genus: Metopina; Macquart, 1835

Type species
- Phora galeata Haliday, 1833

Synonyms
- Comfurcula Schmitz, 1927; Drepanophora Strobl, 1880; Leptophora Six, 1878; Pseudometopina Disney, 1994; Typhlophorina Silvestri, 1947

Genus of flies

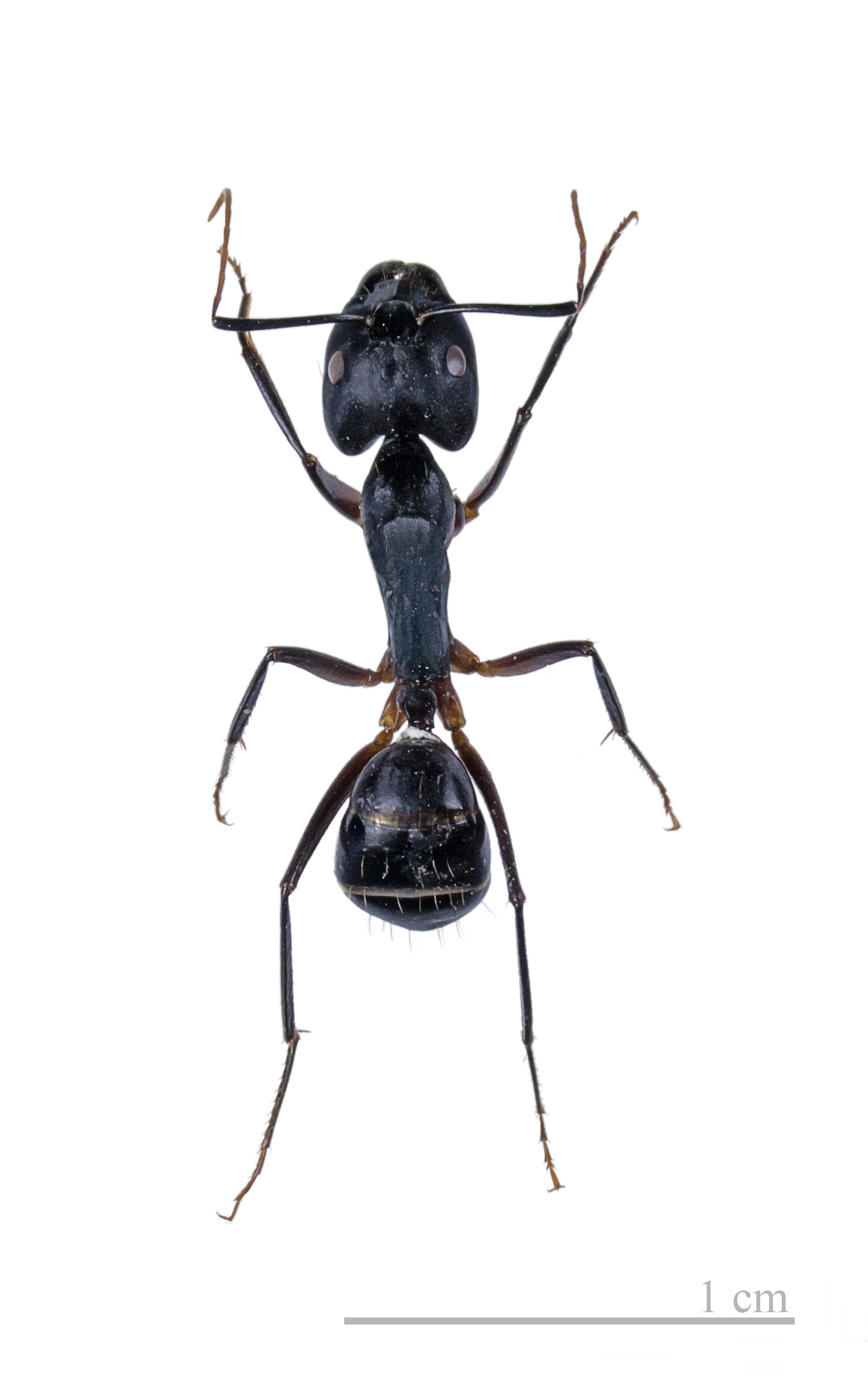

Metopina is a genus of flies in the family Phoridae.

== Species ==
- M. abbreviata Disney & Mikhailovskaya, 1998
- M. aequatoriana Borgmeier & Prado, 1975
- M. alacinia Disney & Mikhailovskaya, 1998
- M. amapaensis Borgmeier, 1967
- M. andersoni Disney, 2003
- M. angustiterga Disney & Mikhailovskaya, 1998
- M. australiana Borgmeier, 1963
- M. braueri (Strobl, 1880)
- M. ciceri Disney, 1988
- M. cindybrownae Disney, 2003
- M. climieorum Disney, 1994
- M. costalis Borgmeier, 1959
- M. crassinervis Schmitz, 1920
- M. crinita Borgmeier, 1959
- M. divergens Borgmeier & Prado, 1975
- M. elongata Disney & Mikhailovskaya, 1998
- M. eminentis Disney & Mikhailovskaya, 1998
- M. fenyesi Malloch, 1912
- M. formicomendicola Schmitz, 1927
- M. fragilis Borgmeier, 1969
- M. fumipennis Borgmeier, 1967
- M. furcans Schmitz, 1928
- M. galeata (Haliday, 1833)
- †M. goeleti Grimaldi, 1989
- M. grandimitralis Yang & Wang, 1995
- M. grootaerti Disney, 2003
- M. heselhausi Schmitz, 1914
- M. howseae Disney, 2003
- M. inaequalis Schmitz, 1927
- M. nepheloptera Beyer, 1966
- M. nevadae Schmitz, 1957
- M. obsoleta Beyer, 1960
- M. oligoneura (Mik, 1867)
- M. palustris Disney & Mikhailovskaya, 1998
- M. papuana Disney, 2003
- M. perpusilla (Six, 1878)
- M. photophila Borgmeier, 1959
- M. pileata Schmitz, 1936
- M. porteri Silva Figueroa, 1916
- M. psociformis (Silvestri, 1947)
- M. queenslandensis Disney, 2003
- M. recurvata Borgmeier, 1969
- M. reflexa Borgmeier, 1969
- M. rhenana Beyer & Schmitz, 1957
- M. ruthenica Disney & Mikhailovskaya, 1998
- M. speciosa Borgmeier, 1969
- M. subarcuata Borgmeier, 1963
- M. tanjae Disney & Prescher, 2003
- M. tarsalis Borgmeier & Prado, 1975
- M. trochanteralis Schmitz, 1953
- M. tumida Borgmeier, 1969
- M. ulrichi Disney, 1979
- M. vanharteni Disney, 2006
- M. ventralis Schmitz, 1927
- M. zikani Borgmeier, 1969
