= Stenophorina =

Scientific classification
- Domain: Eukaryota
- Kingdom: Animalia
- Phylum: Arthropoda
- Class: Insecta
- Order: Diptera
- Family: Phoridae
- Subfamily: Metopininae
- Tribe: Metopinini
- Genus: Stenophorina; Borgmeier, 1963

Type species
- Stenophorina petiolata Borgmeier, 1963

Genus of flies

Stenophorina is a genus of flies in the family Phoridae.

== Species ==
- Stenophorina petiolata Borgmeier, 1963
