= Dacnophora =

Scientific classification
- Domain: Eukaryota
- Kingdom: Animalia
- Phylum: Arthropoda
- Class: Insecta
- Order: Diptera
- Family: Phoridae
- Subfamily: Metopininae
- Tribe: Metopinini
- Genus: Dacnophora; Borgmeier, 1961

Type species
- Dacnophora legionis Borgmeier, 1961

Synonyms
- Daenophora Edwards & Vevers, 1975

Genus of flies

Dacnophora is a genus of flies in the family Phoridae.

== Species ==
- D. brevipes Borgmeier, 1961
- D. discreta Borgmeier, 1961
- D. legionis Borgmeier, 1961
- D. macrochaeta Borgmeier, 1961
- D. pectinatus Brown, 1988
- D. setithorax Borgmeier, 1961
