= Styletta =

Scientific classification
- Domain: Eukaryota
- Kingdom: Animalia
- Phylum: Arthropoda
- Class: Insecta
- Order: Diptera
- Family: Phoridae
- Subfamily: Metopininae
- Tribe: Metopinini
- Genus: Styletta; Borgmeier, 1960

Type species
- Styletta crocea Borgmeier, 1960

Genus of flies

Styletta is a genus of flies in the family Phoridae.

== Species ==
- S. camponoti Brown, 1988
- S. crocea Borgmeier, 1960
- S. ewardurskae Disney, 1990
