= Trophithauma =

Scientific classification
- Domain: Eukaryota
- Kingdom: Animalia
- Phylum: Arthropoda
- Class: Insecta
- Order: Diptera
- Family: Phoridae
- Subfamily: Metopininae
- Tribe: Metopinini
- Genus: Trophithauma; Schmitz, 1925

Type species
- Trophithauma portentum Schmitz, 1925

Genus of flies

Trophithauma is a genus of flies in the family Phoridae.

== Species ==
- T. dissitum Schmitz, 1925
- T. fulvum Gotô, 1984
- T. gastroflavidum Liu, 1995
- T. pellucidum Gotô, 1984
- T. portentum Schmitz, 1925
- T. rostratum (Melander & Brues, 1903)
- T. sinuatum Liu & Chou, 1993
- T. splendidum Schmitz, 1925
