= Myrmosicarius =

Scientific classification
- Domain: Eukaryota
- Kingdom: Animalia
- Phylum: Arthropoda
- Class: Insecta
- Order: Diptera
- Family: Phoridae
- Subfamily: Metopininae
- Tribe: Metopinini
- Genus: Myrmosicarius; Borgmeier, 1928

Type species
- Myrmosicarius gracilipes Borgmeier, 1928

Synonyms
- Attamyia Greene, 1938

Genus of flies

Myrmosicarius is a genus of flies in the family Phoridae.

== Species ==
- M. biarticulatus Borgmeier, 1931
- M. brandaoi Disney, 2006
- M. catharinensis Borgmeier, 1928
- M. cristobalensis Disney, 2006
- M. crudelis Borgmeier, 1928
- M. cuspidatus Borgmeier, 1928
- M. diabolicus Borgmeier, 1931
- M. gonzalezae Disney, 2006
- M. gracilipes Borgmeier, 1928
- M. grandicornis Borgmeier, 1928
- M. infestans Borgmeier, 1931
- M. longipalpis Disney, 2006
- M. persecutor Borgmeier, 1931
- M. simplex Borgmeier & Prado, 1975
- M. tarsipennis Borgmeier, 1928
- M. texanus (Greene, 1938)
