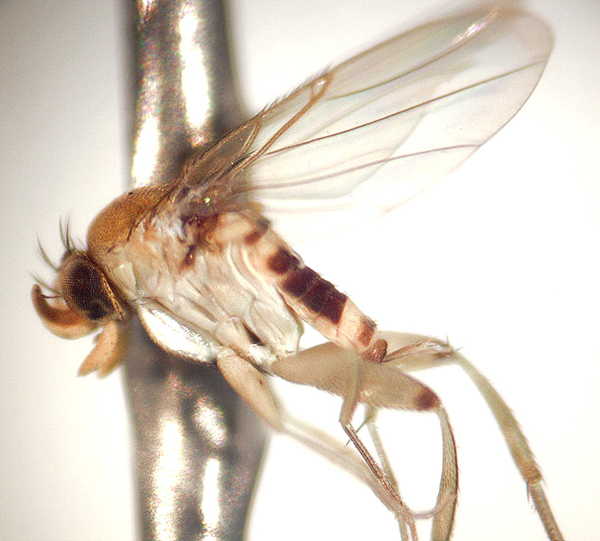
- Apocephalus longistylus

Scientific classification
- Kingdom: Animalia
- Phylum: Arthropoda
- Class: Insecta
- Order: Diptera
- Superfamily: Platypezoidea
- Family: Phoridae
- Subfamily: Metopininae

= Metopininae =

Subfamily of flies

The Metopininae are the largest subfamily of flies in the family Phoridae, largely due to the inclusion of the extremely species-rich genus Megaselia. Members of this subfamily are widespread and common, with species such as Megaselia scalaris being particularly ubiquitous

== Taxonomy ==
Tribe: Beckerinini
- Beckerina Malloch, 1910

Tribe: Metopinini Peterson 1987

- Acanthophorides Borgmeier, 1924
- Acontistoptera Brues, 1902
- Apocephalus Coquillett, 1901
- Auxanommatidia Borgmeier, 1924
- Cataclinusa Schmitz, 1927
- Chonocephalus Wandolleck, 1898
- Commoptera Brues, 1901
- Cremersia Schmitz, 1924
- Dacnophora Borgmeier, 1961
- Diocophora Borgmeier, 1959
- Ecitomyia Brues, 1901
- Ecitoptera Borgmeier & Schmitz, 1923
- Gymnophora Macquart, 1835
- Kerophora Brown, 1988
- Lecanocerus Borgmeier, 1962
- Megaselia Rondani, 1856
- Melaloncha Brues, 1903
- Menozziola Schmitz, 1927
- Metopina Macquart, 1835
- Microselia Schmitz, 1934
- Myrmosicarius Borgmeier, 1928
- Neodohrniphora Malloch, 1914
- Pericyclocera Schmitz, 1927
- Phalacrotophora Enderlein, 1912
- Phymatopterella Brues, 1933
- Physoptera Borgmeier, 1958
- Pseudacteon Coquillett, 1907
- Puliciphora Dahl, 1897
- Rhyncophoromyia Malloch, 1923
- Stenophorina Borgmeier, 1963
- Styletta Borgmeier, 1960
- Syneura Brues, 1903
- Trophithauma Schmitz, 1925
- Trophodeinus Borgmeier, 1960
- Xanionotum Brues, 1902

== Ecology ==
Members of the subfamily Metopininae exhibit diverse ecological habits, particularly within the large genus Megaselia. Larvae of many species are saprophagous, developing in decaying organic material such as fruit, fungi, or compost, while others act as parasitoids. For example, Megaselia scalaris has been recorded as a parasitoid of Isognathus caricae caterpillars. Certain Metopininae species are also regarded as agricultural pests. “Cob flies” (various Megaselia spp.) are known to infest sweet corn, where larvae feed on developing kernels.
