= Xanionotum hystrix =

Scientific classification
- Domain: Eukaryota
- Kingdom: Animalia
- Phylum: Arthropoda
- Class: Insecta
- Order: Diptera
- Family: Phoridae
- Genus: Xanionotum
- Species: X. hystrix

Binomial name
- Xanionotum hystrix Brues, 1902

Species of fly

Xanionotum hystrix is species of Phoridae described by Brues in 1902

Xanionotum hystrix is the type species of the genus Xanionotum.
