= Trophodeinus =

Scientific classification
- Domain: Eukaryota
- Kingdom: Animalia
- Phylum: Arthropoda
- Class: Insecta
- Order: Diptera
- Family: Phoridae
- Subfamily: Metopininae
- Tribe: Metopinini
- Genus: Trophodeinus; Borgmeier, 1960

Type species
- Trophodeinus analis Borgmeier, 1960

Genus of flies

Trophodeinus is a genus of flies in the family Phoridae.

== Species ==
- T. analis Borgmeier, 1960
- T. arizonensis (Borgmeier, 1963)
- T. barberi Borgmeier, 1962
- T. chelifer (Borgmeier, 1963)
- T. denticulatus (Borgmeier, 1963)
- T. lobatus (Borgmeier, 1963)
- T. pygmaeus Borgmeier, 1962
- T. spatulatus (Borgmeier, 1963)
