= Microselia =

Scientific classification
- Domain: Eukaryota
- Kingdom: Animalia
- Phylum: Arthropoda
- Class: Insecta
- Order: Diptera
- Family: Phoridae
- Subfamily: Metopininae
- Tribe: Metopinini
- Genus: Microselia; Schmitz, 1934

Type species
- Microselia rivierae Schmitz, 1934

Genus of flies

Microselia is a genus of flies in the family Phoridae.

== Species ==
- M. beaveri Disney, 1983
- M. cuspidata Beyer, 1965
- M. daccordii Gori, 1999
- M. deemingi Disney, 1983
- M. espanaensis Disney, 2006
- M. forsiusi (Schmitz, 1927)
- M. micropila Carles-Tolrá, 2006
- M. rivierae Schmitz, 1934
- M. southwoodi Disney, 1988
- M. texana Disney, 1982
- M. yemenensis Disney, 2006
