= Neodohrniphora =

Scientific classification
- Domain: Eukaryota
- Kingdom: Animalia
- Phylum: Arthropoda
- Class: Insecta
- Order: Diptera
- Family: Phoridae
- Subfamily: Metopininae
- Tribe: Metopinini
- Genus: Neodohrniphora; Malloch, 1914

Type species
- Neodohrniphora calverti Malloch, 1914

Synonyms
- Wallerphora Disney, 1996; Eibesfeldtphora Disney, 1996; Borgmeieria Prado, 1976

Genus of flies

Neodohrniphora is a genus of flies in the family Phoridae.

== Species ==
- N. acromyrmecis Borgmeier, 1925
- N. arcuata Brown, 2001
- N. arnaudi Borgmeier, 1966
- N. attae Disney, 1996
- N. bragancai Brown, 2001
- N. calverti Malloch, 1914
- N. cognata Prado, 1976
- N. curvinervis (Malloch, 1914)
- N. declinata Borgmeier, 1925
- N. dissita Brown, 2001
- N. elongata Brown, 2001
- N. erthali Brown, 2001
- N. inferna Brown, 2001
- N. isomorpha Brown, 2001
- N. leei Brown, 2001
- N. mexicanae Disney, 1996
- N. montana Borgmeier, 1925
- N. pala Brown, 2001
- N. prolixa Brown, 2001
- N. robusta Borgmeier, 1925
- N. similis Prado, 1976
- N. tonhascai Brown, 2001
- N. wasmanni Borgmeier, 1928
