= Auxanommatidia =

Scientific classification
- Domain: Eukaryota
- Kingdom: Animalia
- Phylum: Arthropoda
- Class: Insecta
- Order: Diptera
- Family: Phoridae
- Subfamily: Metopininae
- Tribe: Metopinini
- Genus: Auxanommatidia; Borgmeier, 1924

Type species
- Auxanommatidia variegata Borgmeier, 1923

Genus of flies

Auxanommatidia is a genus of flies in the family Phoridae.

== Species ==
- A. abbreviata Borgmeier, 1958
- A. californica Borgmeier, 1963
- A. hardicki Borgmeier, 1925
- A. intermedia Borgmeier & Prado, 1975
- A. myrmecophila Borgmeier, 1925
- A. pilifemur Borgmeier, 1925
- A. simplex Borgmeier, 1958
- A. variegata Borgmeier, 1924
