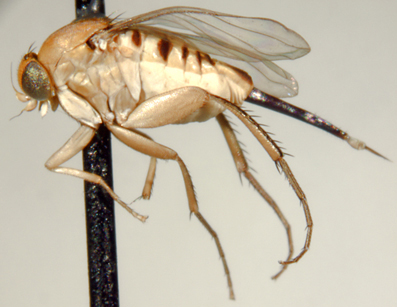
- Female Melaloncha punctifrons

Scientific classification
- Kingdom: Animalia
- Phylum: Arthropoda
- Clade: Pancrustacea
- Class: Insecta
- Order: Diptera
- Family: Phoridae
- Subfamily: Metopininae
- Genus: Melaloncha; Brues, 1903

Synonyms
- Melanoloncha Bezzi & Stein, 1907; Udamochiras Enderlein, 1912

= Melaloncha =

Genus of flies

Melaloncha is a genus of phorid flies (Diptera: Phoridae) commonly referred to as "bee-killing flies". They are found almost exclusively in the Neotropical realm, although there is one record from extreme southern Texas, United States. They are small flies, usually about 2–3 millimetres (0.08–0.12 in) in length. No true fossils are known, although there are some specimens in Colombian copal, of unknown (but likely relatively recent) age.

== Life history ==
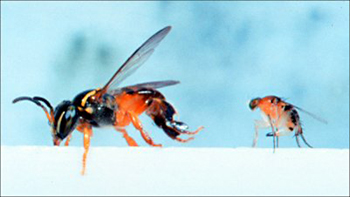
Female M. acoma attacking host stingless bee

Species of Melaloncha are parasitoids of bees, especially stingless bees (Meliponini), but also introduced European honey bees (Apis mellifera), bumblebees (Bombus), and halictid bees (Megalopta). Some attack their hosts while flying, darting down to lay their eggs; others land, curl their ovipositor under their bodies and rush their hosts on foot (as in M. acoma, see photo); a few carefully land on their host and stealthily inject their egg.

The flies can be attracted by spraying a mixture of honey and water on undergrowth to attract an aggregation of host bees. Frequently, they are found on palm tree flowers (again, with host bees), and sometimes they are encountered around bee nests.

== Taxonomy ==
The type species of the genus is Melaloncha pulchella Brues, a species from Bolivia. The holotype specimen was lost in a fire at the Hungarian National Museum. About 170 species are known, but many more exist, and the final total for the genus is likely to be 200–300. Melaloncha is organized into two subgenera, Udamochiras (51 species) and Melaloncha (117 species).

== Economic importance ==
The parasitization of honey bees and native stingless bees causes premature mortality of workers and is a drain on the colony. The effects of Melaloncha parasitism on commercial beekeeping, including efforts to keep native tropical stingless bees (meliponiculture), and the scale of financial losses due to these flies has not been studied.

== Species ==
- M. acicula Brown, 2006
- M. acoma Brown & Kung, 2006
- M. adusta Brown & Kung, 2006
- M. altobenia González & Brown, 2004
- M. anaticula Brown, 2004
- M. ancistra González & Brown, 2004
- M. angustifrons Brown, 2004
- M. annicae Kung, 2008
- M. apicula Brown, 2004
- M. aprica Brown, 2004
- M. atlantica Brown, 2005
- M. atribiseta González & Brown, 2004
- M. atrilingula Brown & Kung, 2006
- M. basella Brown, 2004
- M. berezovskiyi Brown, 2006
- M. biseta Brown, 2004
- M. borgmeieri Brown & Kung, 2006
- M. brevicarina Brown, 2004
- M. browni Kung, 2008
- M. calatha Brown, 2006
- M. calceola Brown, 2005
- M. caligula Brown & Kung, 2006
- M. candida Brown & Kung, 2006
- M. carinata Brown, 2004
- M. castanea Brown & Kung, 2006
- M. catervula Brown, 2005
- M. chamaea Brown, 2005
- M. ciliata Brown, 2006
- M. cingulata Borgmeier, 1959
- M. clandestina Brown, 2005
- M. clavata Schmitz, 1927
- M. claviapex Brown, 2006
- M. colossia (Enderlein, 1912)
- M. compressicauda Brown, 2004
- M. concavella González & Brown, 2004
- M. cordyla Brown, 2006
- M. corniculata González & Brown, 2004
- M. costaricana Borgmeier, 1934
- M. crassa Brown, 2004
- M. crinita Brown, 2006
- M. cristula Brown, 2006
- M. cucharella González & Brown, 2004
- M. culmena Brown, 2006
- M. curtibrachia Brown, 2006
- M. curvata Brown, 2005
- M. cuspidata Borgmeier, 1934
- M. dactyla Brown, 2005
- M. debilis Brown, 2006
- M. declivata Brown, 2006
- M. deinocerca Borgmeier, 1960
- M. diastata Brown, 2006
- M. dibitattii Brown, 2006
- M. diffidentia Brown, 2005
- M. digitalis Borgmeier, 1959
- M. elongata Brown, 2005
- M. elviae Brown, 2004
- M. erinacea Brown, 2006
- M. exigua Brown, 2004
- M. falcata Brown, 2004
- M. feleoae Brown, 2006
- M. flava Borgmeier, 1959
- M. flavilata Brown, 2004
- M. flavilineata Brown, 2006
- M. forficata Brown, 2006
- M. furcata Borgmeier, 1934
- M. fuscipalpis Brown, 2006
- M. genitalis Borgmeier, 1934
- M. gibberosa Brown, 2005
- M. glabrifrons Borgmeier, 1934
- M. gomezi Brown, 2006
- M. gongyla Brown, 2005
- M. gonzalezae Brown, 2006
- M. gradata Brown, 2006
- M. hamata Brown, 2004
- M. hansoni Brown, 2004
- M. hirsuta Brown, 2006
- M. hirticauda Borgmeier, 1934
- M. hirticula Brown, 2004
- M. hirtipecta Brown, 2005
- M. horologia Brown, 2004
- M. hyalinipennis Borgmeier, 1933
- M. immaculata Brown, 2006
- M. individa Brown, 2004
- M. inicua Brown, 2006
- M. inversa Brown, 2005
- M. juxta Brown, 2006
- M. kittsonae Brown, 2006
- M. kungae Brown, 2005
- M. lacerna Brown, 2006
- M. lamellata Borgmeier, 1934
- M. laselvae Brown, 2006
- M. laticlava Brown, 2006
- M. licina Brown, 2006
- M. lingula Brown, 2005
- M. lobata Brown, 2004
- M. luteipleura Borgmeier, 1934
- M. maculata Borgmeier, 1934
- M. maculifrons Brown, 2004
- M. mapiriensis Brown, 2005
- M. mexicana Borgmeier, 1971
- M. muricata Brown, 2006
- M. nannocauda Brown, 2006
- M. nigricorpus Borgmeier, 1934
- M. nigrifrons Borgmeier, 1971
- M. nigrita Borgmeier, 1959
- M. nudibasalis Brown, 2004
- M. obscurella Borgmeier, 1934
- M. oligoseta Brown, 2006
- M. ovata Brown, 2005
- M. palpalis Borgmeier, 1934
- M. parkeri Brown, 2004
- M. paxilla Brown, 2004
- M. pegmata Brown, 2006
- M. pertica Brown, 2004
- M. piliapex Borgmeier, 1938
- M. pilidorsata Brown, 2006
- M. pilula Brown, 2005
- M. platypoda Brown, 2006
- M. plaumanni Borgmeier, 1938
- M. premordica Brown, 2004
- M. prosopica Brown, 2004
- M. prostata Brown, 2006
- M. pulchella Brues, 1904
- M. punctifrons Borgmeier, 1934
- M. rasmusseni Brown, 2006
- M. rhampha Brown, 2004
- M. rhypopoda Brown, 2004
- M. rodeoensis Brown, 2006
- M. ronnai Borgmeier, 1935
- M. rostrata Brown, 2004
- M. rubricornis Borgmeier, 1924
- M. ruinensis Brown, 2006
- M. sarmientoi González & Brown, 2004
- M. schiaffinoae González & Brown, 2004
- M. setitibialis Brown, 2006
- M. simillima Borgmeier, 1938
- M. simoni Brown, 2006
- M. simotris Brown, 2006
- M. sinistra Borgmeier, 1971
- M. sinuosa Brown, 2004
- M. spatula Brown, 2004
- M. spicula Brown, 2004
- M. spina Brown, 2006
- M. stenotes González & Brown, 2004
- M. striatula Borgmeier, 1934
- M. strigosa Brown, 2006
- M. stylata (Schiner, 1868)
- M. succincta Brown, 2004
- M. tambopatensis Brown, 2006
- M. thompsonae Brown, 2004
- M. torquata Brown, 2006
- M. triangularis Brown, 2004
- M. trichopera Brown, 2006
- M. trita Brown, 2006
- M. trua Brown, 2004
- M. tuparroensis Brown, 2006
- M. umbra Brown, 2006
- M. ungulata Borgmeier, 1938
- M. ustulata Brown, 2006
- M. valeria Brown, 2004
- M. vargasi Brown, 2004
- M. variabilis Brown, 2004
- M. varicosa Brown, 2005
- M. villosa Brown, 2004
- M. woodi Brown, 2004
- M. xanthocauda Brown, 2006
- M. zikani Borgmeier, 1934
- M. zurquiensis Brown, 2006
