= Kerophora =

Scientific classification
- Domain: Eukaryota
- Kingdom: Animalia
- Phylum: Arthropoda
- Class: Insecta
- Order: Diptera
- Family: Phoridae
- Subfamily: Metopininae
- Tribe: Metopinini
- Genus: Kerophora; Brown, 1988

Type species
- Kerophora ferruginea Brown, 1988

Genus of flies

Kerophora is a genus of flies in the family Phoridae.

== Species ==
- K. brunnea Brown, 1988
- K. ferruginea Brown, 1988
- K. sicula Brown, 1988
