= Dohrniphora incisuralis =

Scientific classification
- Kingdom: Animalia
- Phylum: Arthropoda
- Clade: Pancrustacea
- Class: Insecta
- Order: Diptera
- Family: Phoridae
- Genus: Dohrniphora
- Species: D. incisuralis

Binomial name
- Dohrniphora incisuralis (Loew, 1896)

Synonyms
- Phora incisuralis Loew, 1866

Species of fly

Dohrniphora incisuralis is a species of scuttle fly in the family Phoridae.
