= Myriophora alexandrae =

Scientific classification
- Kingdom: Animalia
- Phylum: Arthropoda
- Class: Insecta
- Order: Diptera
- Family: Phoridae
- Genus: Myriophora
- Species: M. alexandrae

Binomial name
- Myriophora alexandrae Hash & Brown, 2015

Species of fly

Myriophora alexandrae is a parasitic insect from the genus Myriophora. Myriophora are flies that kill their definitive host, millipedes.

== Geographic distribution ==
This is a "new world" parasite that has been found in the Southwestern part of the United States, and Central America specifically, Costa Rica

== Attraction to host's natural defense ==
Myriophora are initially attracted to the chemical toxin released by their host that is used to keep predators away. However, this same toxin is what attracts the Myriophora. Specifically, the flies are more attracted when 2-methoxy-3-methyl-1,4-benzoquinone is combined with another chemical 2-methyl-1,4-benzoquinone.

== Morphology ==
An adult female body length ranges form 1.54-1.93 mm. Each adult has one ovipositor located on the posterior end of the parasite that is a needle like shape. It has two wings and each wing ranges from 1.4-1.96mm in length. The top half of the parasite is brown and the bottom half is white.

== Life cycle ==
When an adult female Myriophora locates a millipede, it uses its ovipositor to penetrate the millipede in an unprotected areas (e.g. base of the antennae, between body segments, and the unprotected underbelly) of the millipede. An egg is delivered through the ovipositor and hatches inside of the millipede. Once the egg hatches, the maggot ingests the insides of the millipede a process that takes approximately five days. Once the millipede is fully consumed, all that will be left is the hind-gut and the exuvia. The Myriophora maggot then metamorphoses into an adult fly.
