= Puliciphora borinquenensis =

Scientific classification
- Domain: Eukaryota
- Kingdom: Animalia
- Phylum: Arthropoda
- Class: Insecta
- Order: Diptera
- Family: Phoridae
- Genus: Puliciphora
- Species: P. borinquenensis

Binomial name
- Puliciphora borinquenensis Wheeler, 1906

Species of fly

Puliciphora borinquenensis is a species of scuttle flies (insects in the family Phoridae).
