= Conicera tibialis =

Scientific classification
- Kingdom: Animalia
- Phylum: Arthropoda
- Class: Insecta
- Order: Diptera
- Family: Phoridae
- Genus: Conicera
- Species: C. tibialis

Binomial name
- Conicera tibialis Schmitz, 1925

Species of fly

Conicera tibialis, commonly known as the coffin fly, is a phorid fly in the genus Conicera known for its occurrence on buried human cadavers. Adult female coffin flies can burrow up to 2 meters (6.6 ft) into soil and enter coffins in order to lay eggs on or near the resting corpse. Maggots feed on the flesh of the corpse after hatching, with a preference for lean muscular tissue. Coffin flies sometimes do not surface at all—multiple consecutive generations of coffin flies can cycle completely, entirely underground. Coffin flies have been found on corpses years after death, and in 2011 an exhumed coffin in central Spain revealed a large number of coffin flies inhabiting the coffin and feeding on the cadaver 18 years after death—far beyond the 3–5 year postmortem intervals previously recorded.
