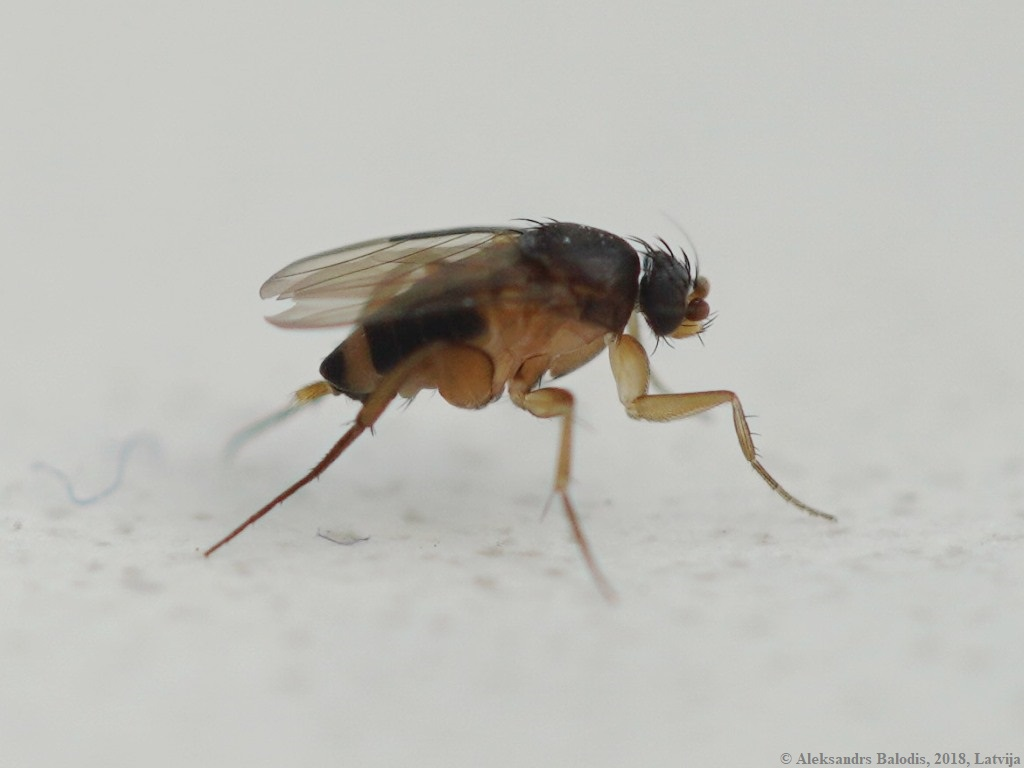

Scientific classification
- Kingdom: Animalia
- Phylum: Arthropoda
- Class: Insecta
- Order: Diptera
- Family: Phoridae
- Genus: Dohrniphora
- Species: D. cornuta

Binomial name
- Dohrniphora cornuta (Bigot, 1857)

= Dohrniphora cornuta =

Species of fly

Dohrniphora cornuta is a cosmopolitan species of scuttle fly (Phoridae).

== Description ==
This species can be distinguished from others of its genus by its dark brown scutum and the mid tibia having a dorsal hair palisade along roughly one-third of its length. In males, the hind coxa has a round lobe that protrudes posteriorly, while the inner face of the hind femur has 4–6 peg-like setae on a basal sensory area and 10–20 hairs near the dorsobasal margin.

Males are 2.26–2.86 mm long, while females are slightly larger at 2.87–3.70 mm.

== Ecology ==
Dohrniphora cornuta has been spread worldwide by human activities and is common in urban areas (synanthropic). It is a polyphagous scavenger. Adults have been found in habitats such as garbage, beetle rearing cages and the decaying bodies of crickets. Larvae live in various kinds of decaying plant and animal matter. It is a secondary invader of carrion, appearing after other flies.

== Gallery ==
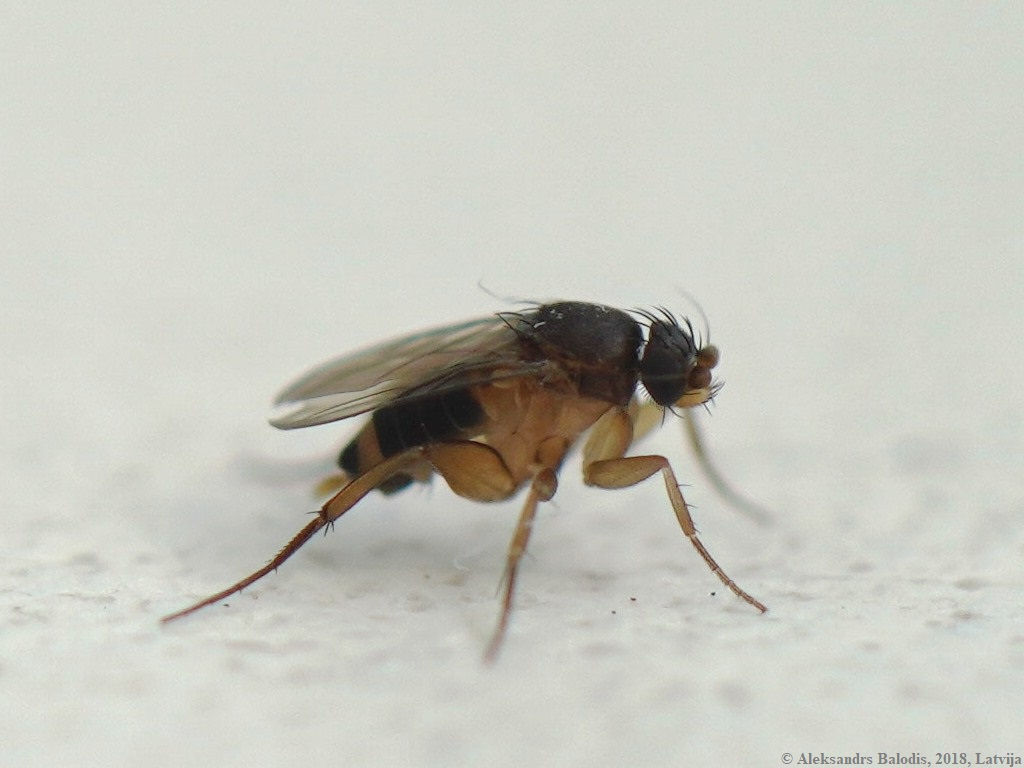
