= Gymnophora luteiventris =

Scientific classification
- Kingdom: Animalia
- Phylum: Arthropoda
- Clade: Pancrustacea
- Class: Insecta
- Order: Diptera
- Family: Phoridae
- Genus: Gymnophora
- Species: G. luteiventris

Binomial name
- Gymnophora luteiventris Schmitz, 1952

Species of fly

Gymnophora luteiventris is a species of scuttle flies (insects in the family Phoridae).
