= Nothomicrodon =

Nothomicrodon aztecarum

Scientific classification
- Kingdom: Animalia
- Phylum: Arthropoda
- Class: Insecta
- Order: Diptera
- Family: Phoridae
- Genus: Nothomicrodon; Wheeler, 1924
- Species: N. aztecarum

Binomial name
- Nothomicrodon aztecarum Wheeler, 1924

Species of fly

Nothomicrodon aztecarum is a species of Neotropical flies, originally described from a larva collected in 1924 from a carton nest of the ant Azteca trigona. It is the only species in the genus Nothomicrodon, but shows none of the features of a hoverfly larva, the family in which it was originally classified, and instead belongs in the family Phoridae.
