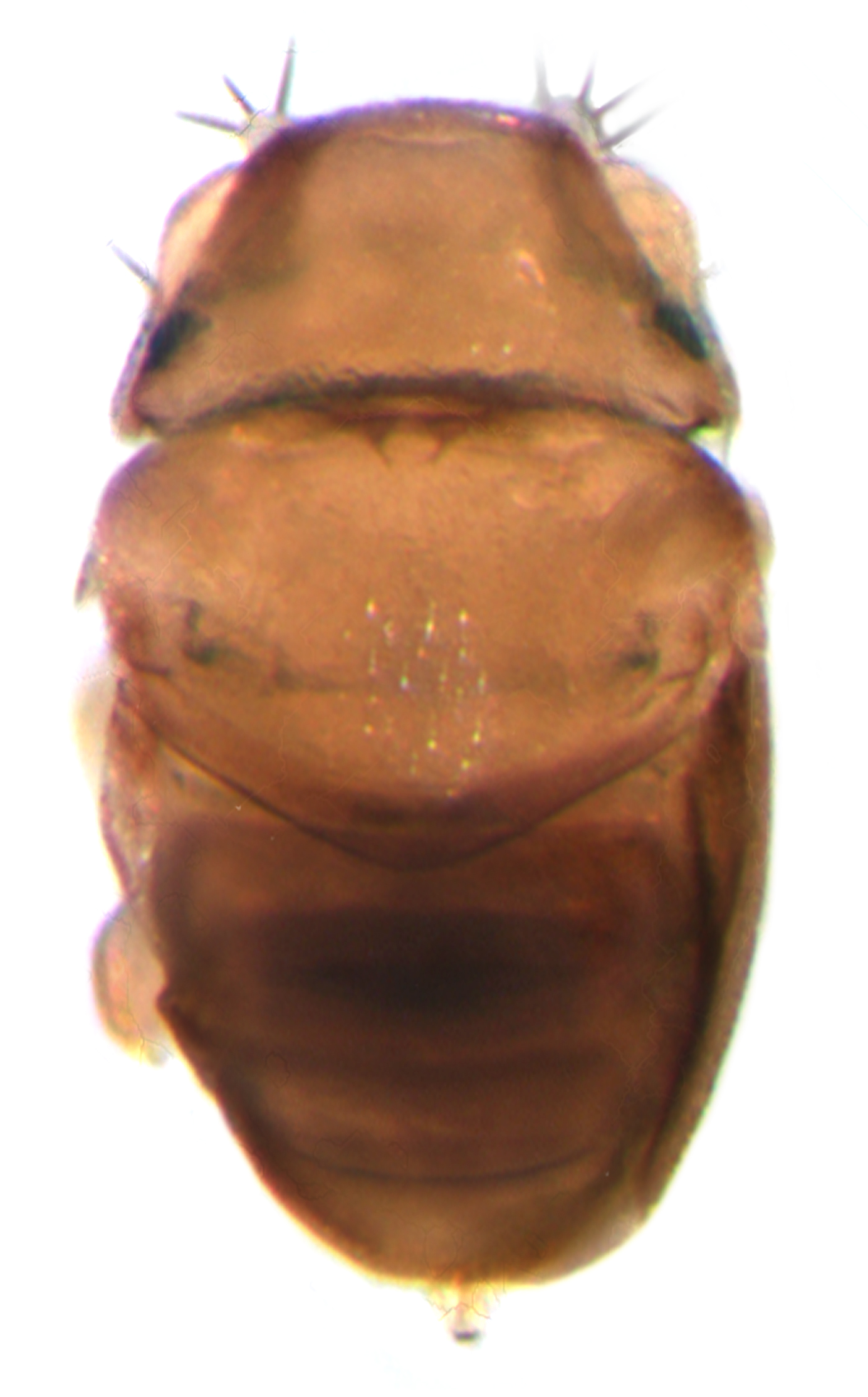

Scientific classification
- Kingdom: Animalia
- Phylum: Arthropoda
- Clade: Pancrustacea
- Class: Insecta
- Order: Diptera
- Family: Phoridae
- Genus: Euryplatea
- Species: E. nanaknihali

Binomial name
- Euryplatea nanaknihali Brown, 2012

= Euryplatea nanaknihali =

Species of fly

Euryplatea nanaknihali is the world's smallest fly, measuring 0.4 millimetres (0.016 in) in size. It is believed to use ants as hosts for its larvae. The species was discovered in Thailand.

== Description ==
Euryplatea nanaknihali is the smallest fly in the order Diptera, measuring 0.4 millimetres (0.016 in) in size. Due to its small size, the viscosity of air is problematic for the insect, and even the smallest air currents are a large impediment. Scientists have expressed amazement that such a tiny animal could still have all the organs of a normal insect.

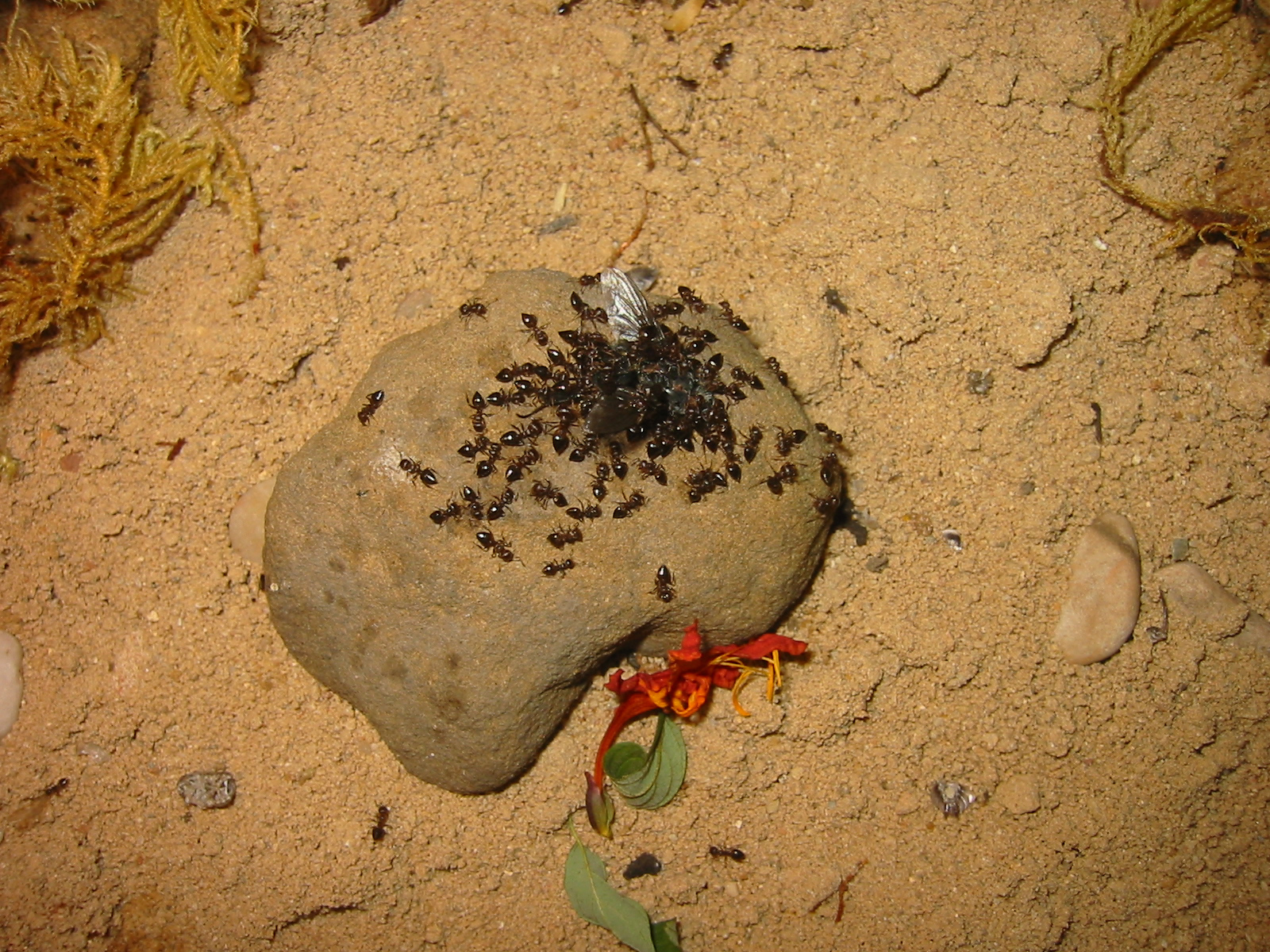
Crematogaster ants may be the host of E. nanaknihali.

They are believed to lay their eggs in the heads of small Crematogaster ants. The larva consumes the interior of the ant's head, within whose exoskeleton it pupates, before emerging as an adult.

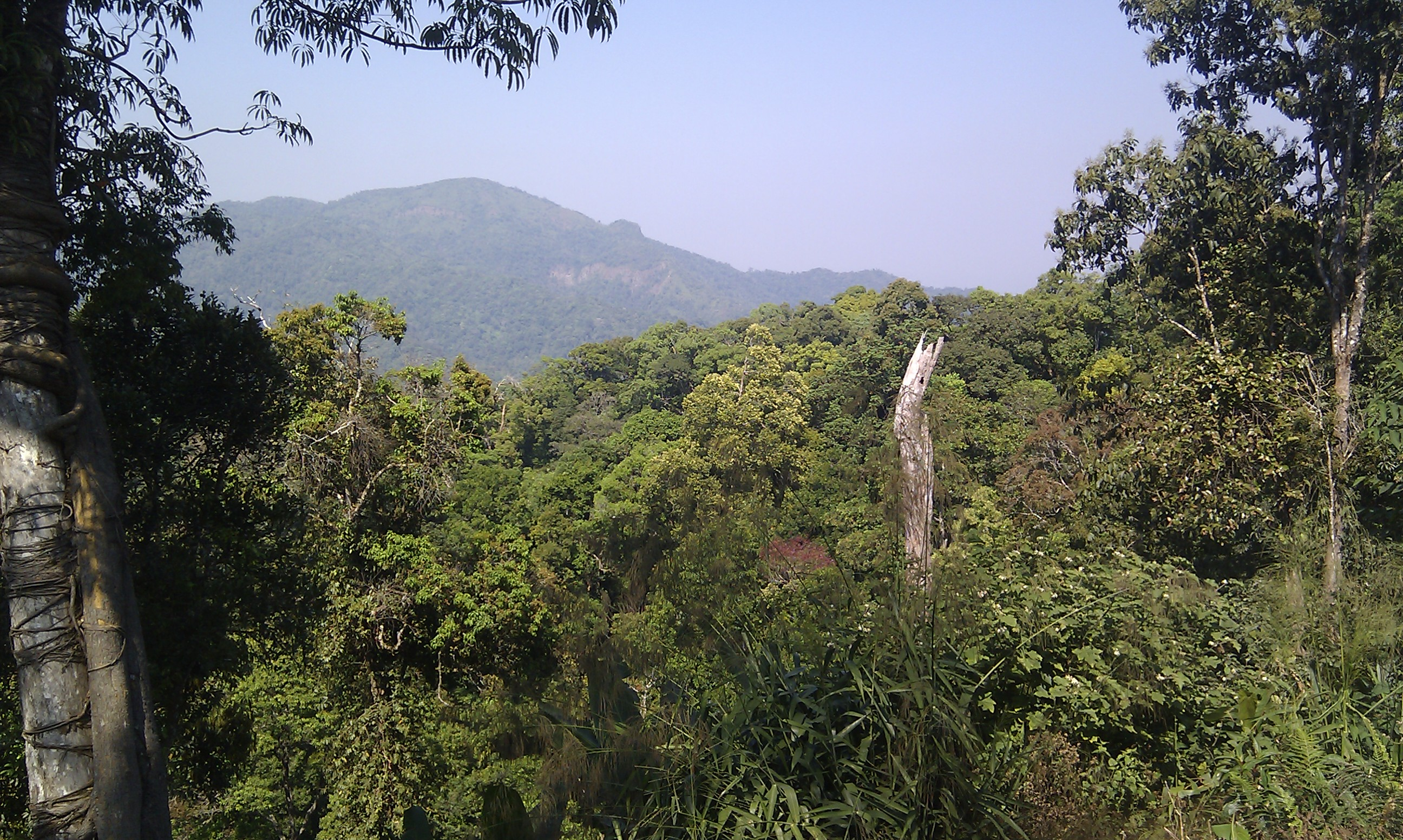
E. nanaknihali was first discovered in Thailand's Kaeng Krachan National Park.

The species has been found in a number of national parks in Thailand. It is named after Nanak Nihal Weiss, a boy interested in insects who frequented the Natural History Museum of Los Angeles County with his father.
