= Gymnophora =

Scientific classification
- Kingdom: Animalia
- Phylum: Arthropoda
- Class: Insecta
- Order: Diptera
- Family: Phoridae
- Subfamily: Metopininae
- Genus: Gymnophora; Macquart, 1835

Type species
- Phora arcuata Meigen, 1830

Genus of flies

Gymnophora is a genus of scuttle flies (insects in the family Phoridae). There are at least 60 described species in Gymnophora.

== Species ==
These 69 species belong to the genus Gymnophora:

- Gymnophora acutangula Schmitz, 1929^{c g}
- Gymnophora adumbrata Borgmeier, 1960^{c g}
- Gymnophora aemula Borgmeier, 1960^{c g}
- Gymnophora alces Brown, 1987^{c g}
- Gymnophora amurensis Mostovski & Mikhailovskaya, 2003^{c g}
- Gymnophora arcuata (Meigen, 1830)^{c g}
- Gymnophora auricula Brown, 1987^{c g}
- Gymnophora brasiliensis Borgmeier, 1960^{c g}
- Gymnophora browni Liu, 2001^{c g}
- Gymnophora carina Brown, 1987^{i c g}
- Gymnophora chilensis Borgmeier, 1960^{c g}
- Gymnophora colona Brues, 1911^{c g}
- Gymnophora commotria Schmitz, 1929^{c g}
- Gymnophora cymatoneura Enderlein, 1912^{c g}
- Gymnophora damula Brown, 1987^{c g}
- Gymnophora dispariseta Brown, 1998^{c g}
- Gymnophora emarginata Brown, 1998^{c g}
- Gymnophora enigmata Brown, 1989^{c g}
- Gymnophora falciformis Brown, 1987^{c g}
- Gymnophora fastigiorum Schmitz, 1952^{i c g}
- Gymnophora forcipis Brown, 1987^{c g}
- Gymnophora forticornis Schmitz, 1927^{c g}
- Gymnophora gornostaevi Mostovski & Mikhailovskaya, 2003^{c g}
- Gymnophora gotoi Brown, 1989^{c g}
- Gymnophora healeyae Disney, 1980^{c g}
- Gymnophora heteroneura Schmitz, 1929^{c g}
- Gymnophora inexpectata Beyer, 1958^{c g}
- Gymnophora integralis Schmitz, 1920^{c g}
- Gymnophora inthanonensis Brown, 1998^{c g}
- Gymnophora inusitata Brown, 1987^{c g}
- Gymnophora lacertosa Brown, 1987^{c g}
- Gymnophora laciniata Mikhailovskaya, 1997^{c g}
- Gymnophora lapidicola (Bezzi, 1922)^{c g}
- Gymnophora latibrachia Brown, 1987^{c g}
- Gymnophora longissima Brown, 1989^{c g}
- Gymnophora luteiventris Schmitz, 1952^{i c g b}
- Gymnophora malaisei Brown, 1998^{c g}
- Gymnophora marshalli Brown, 1987^{i c g}
- Gymnophora multipinnacula Brown, 1987^{c g}
- Gymnophora nepalensis Brown, 1989^{c g}
- Gymnophora nigripennis Schmitz, 1929^{c g}
- Gymnophora nonpachyneura Liu, 2001^{c g}
- Gymnophora palmula Brown, 1998^{c g}
- Gymnophora parachilensis Brown, 1987^{c g}
- Gymnophora pararcuata Brown, 1989^{c g}
- Gymnophora parva Brown, 1998^{c g}
- Gymnophora penai Brown, 1987^{c g}
- Gymnophora perpropinqua Mostovski & Mikhailovskaya, 2003^{c g}
- Gymnophora platypalpis Brown, 1989^{c g}
- Gymnophora prescherweberae Disney, 1997^{c g}
- Gymnophora priora Brown, 1989^{c g}
- Gymnophora prolata Brown, 1989^{c g}
- Gymnophora quadrata Brown, 1987^{c g}
- Gymnophora quadriseta Brown, 1989^{c g}
- Gymnophora quartomollis Schmitz, 1920^{c g}
- Gymnophora setulata Brown, 1989^{c g}
- Gymnophora spiracularis Borgmeier, 1971^{c g}
- Gymnophora strigula Brown, 1987^{c g}
- Gymnophora subarcuata Schmitz, 1952^{i c g}
- Gymnophora subuncata Brown, 1987^{c g}
- Gymnophora talea Brown, 1987^{i c g}
- Gymnophora tenuivenia Schmitz, 1931^{c g}
- Gymnophora thormini Brown, 1998^{c g}
- Gymnophora triangularis Brown, 1987^{c g}
- Gymnophora trispina Brown, 1987^{c g}
- Gymnophora uncata Brown, 1987^{c g}
- Gymnophora unidentata Brown, 1987^{c g}
- Gymnophora verrucata Schmitz, 1927^{c g}
- Gymnophora victoria Mostovski & Mikhailovskaya, 2003^{c g}

Data sources: i = ITIS, c = Catalogue of Life, g = GBIF, b = Bugguide.net
