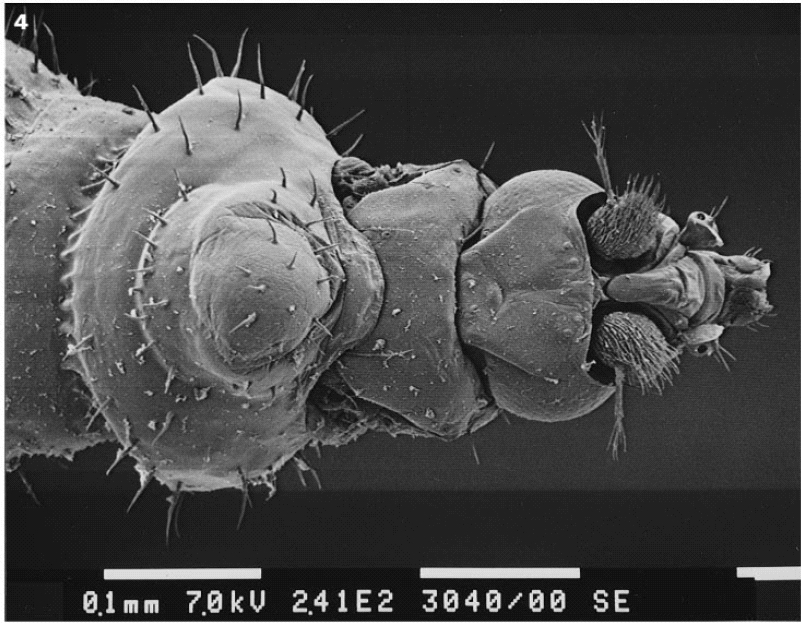
- Electron micrograph of the head of an adult Vestigipoda maschwitzi female as seen from the top

Scientific classification
- Domain: Eukaryota
- Kingdom: Animalia
- Phylum: Arthropoda
- Class: Insecta
- Order: Diptera
- Family: Phoridae
- Genus: Vestigipoda; Disney, 1996

Type species
- Vestigipoda myrmolarvoidea Disney, 1996

Species
- V. breviseta; V. intermedia; V. longiseta; V. maschwitzi; V. myrmolarvoidea

= Vestigipoda =

Genus of myrmecophilous flies

Vestigipoda is a genus of myrmecophilous flies in the family Phoridae which live in the nests of army ants. The genus was discovered in Malaysia in 1994 from a colony of Aenictus gracilis and described in 1996 by dipterologist Ronald Henry Disney. The biology of Vestigipoda is still poorly understood, but they are highly derived and specialized for posing as ants and living inside ant colonies. Their eggs closely resemble the eggs of their hosts. Adult females are legless, wingless, and mimic the host larvae. Adult males are not yet described, but exist and are presumably winged. The cuticular hydrocarbon (CHC) profile of V. maschwitzi taken from ant nests has been shown to resemble that of the host ants; it is speculated that the two shared peaks in the respective CHC profiles are compounds that allow the flies to be falsely identified as ant larvae, or at least prevent them from being recognized as foreign, but this has not yet been tested. As of 2008, all known species of Vestigipoda are found in Malaysia and inhabit the nests of various Aenictus species.
