= Lecanocerus =

Scientific classification
- Domain: Eukaryota
- Kingdom: Animalia
- Phylum: Arthropoda
- Class: Insecta
- Order: Diptera
- Family: Phoridae
- Genus: Lecanocerus; Borgmeier, 1962
- Species: L. compressiceps

Binomial name
- Lecanocerus compressiceps Borgmeier, 1962

Genus of flies

Lecanocerus is a genus of scuttle flies (insects in the family Phoridae). There is at least one described species in Lecanocerus, L. compressiceps.
