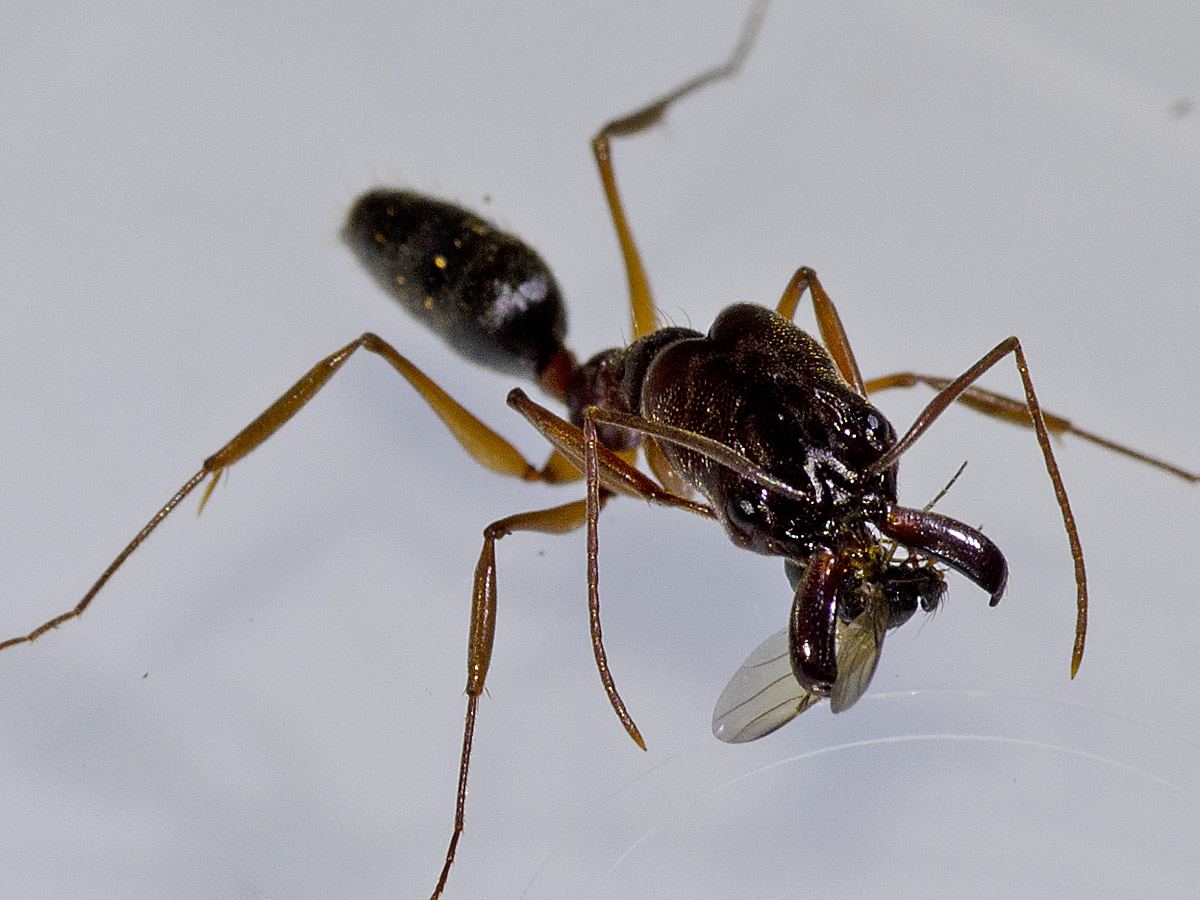
- Dohrniphora fly captured by an ant

Scientific classification
- Kingdom: Animalia
- Phylum: Arthropoda
- Class: Insecta
- Order: Diptera
- Family: Phoridae
- Subfamily: Phorinae
- Genus: Dohrniphora; Dahl, 1898

Diversity
- at least 240 species

= Dohrniphora =

Genus of flies

Dohrniphora is a genus of scuttle flies (insects in the family Phoridae). There are at least 240 described species in Dohrniphora.

== See also ==
- List of Dohrniphora species
