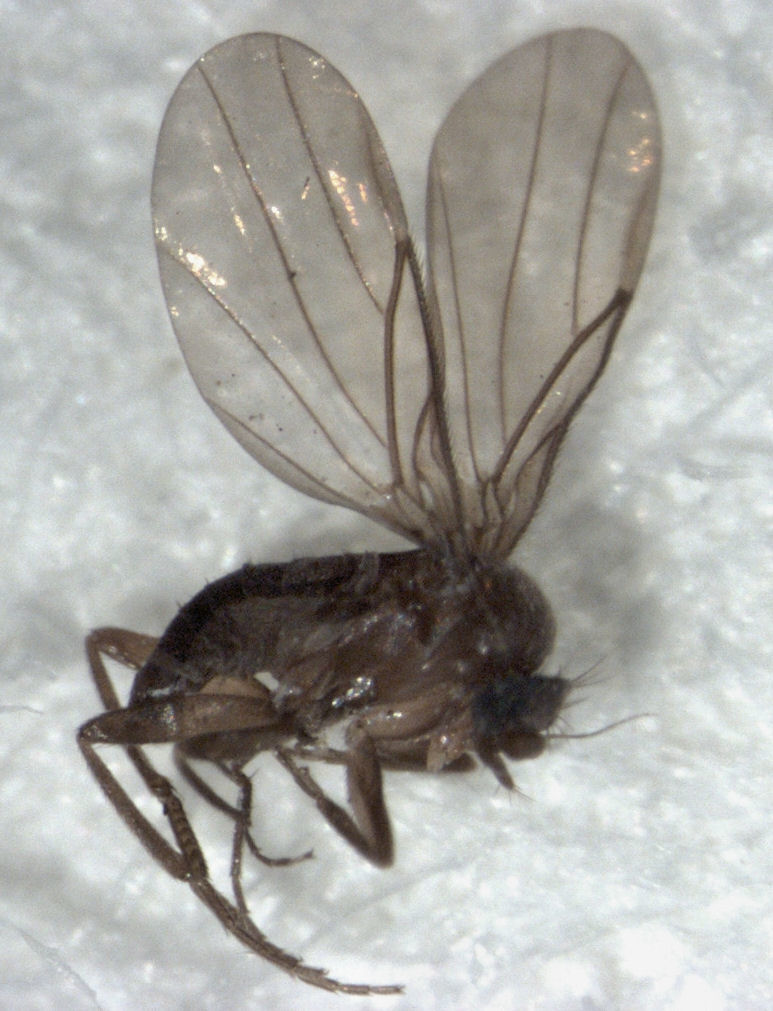

Scientific classification
- Kingdom: Animalia
- Phylum: Arthropoda
- Class: Insecta
- Order: Diptera
- Family: Phoridae
- Subfamily: Metopininae
- Genus: Puliciphora; Dahl, 1897

Diversity
- at least 110 species

= Puliciphora =

Genus of flies

Puliciphora is a genus of scuttle flies (insects in the family Phoridae). There are at least 110 described species in Puliciphora.

== See also ==
- List of Puliciphora species
