= Benno Wandolleck =

German sports shooter

Personal information
- Born: 18 April 1864 Danzig, Kingdom of Prussia
- Died: 1930 (aged 65–66)

Sport
- Sport: Sports shooting

Benno Wandolleck (18 April 1864 – 1930) was a German sports shooter and zoologist. He competed in the 30m team military pistol event at the 1912 Summer Olympics.
