= Charles Thomas Brues =

American entomologist (1879–1955)

- Born: June 20, 1879; Wheeling, West Virginia
- Died: July 22, 1955 (aged 76); Crescent City, Florida
- Education: University of Texas at Austin, Columbia University
- Occupation: entomologist

Charles Thomas Brues (June 20, 1879, Wheeling, West Virginia – July 22, 1955, Crescent City, Florida) was an American entomologist.

== Biography ==
Brues studied at the University of Texas at Austin and at Columbia University. He was appointed field agent of the Bureau of Entomology, United States Department of Agriculture 1904–05, curator of invertebrate zoology at the Milwaukee Public Museum 1905–09, and then became instructor in economic entomology at Harvard University.

His contributions on embryology and the habits of insects, notably Hymenoptera (ants, bees, etc.) and Diptera (mosquitoes, flies, fleas, etc.) are highly instructive. He was editor of the Bulletin of the Wisconsin Natural History Society 1907–09, and in 1910 was appointed editor of Psyche, a journal of entomology.

In 1913, while employed at the Bussey Institution, he was part of a three-person team (along with Ernest Tyzzer and Dr. Richard P. Strong) that studied tropical diseases in Peru and Ecuador.

Brues is commemorated in the scientific name of a species of Caribbean snake, Mastigodryas bruesi.

== Works ==
- A Key to the Families of North American Insects (1915). Scanned version. (with Axel Leonard Melander).
- Insects and Human Welfare (1920, reprinted 1947).
- Classification of Insects (1931).
- Insect Dietary : An Account of the Food Habits of Insects (1945).

== Sources ==
- Allen G. Debus (Editor) (1968). World Who’s Who in Science. A Biographical Dictionary of Notable Scientists from Antiquity to the Present. Chicago: Marquis-Who's Who. xvi + 1,855 pp.
- French Wikipedia
