= Hermann Schmitz (entomologist) =

German entomologist (1878–1960)

- Born: 12 August 1878; Elberfeld, Wuppertal, Germany
- Died: 1 September 1960 (aged 82); Bad Godesberg, Germany
- Scientific career
- Fields: Entomology
- Author abbrev. (zoology): Schmitz

Hermann Schmitz (12 August 1878 in Elberfeld, Wuppertal – 1 September 1960 in Bad Godesberg) was a German entomologist who specialised in Hymenoptera and Diptera.

His personal collection of data on flies and the literature of flies were looted by the Nazis during World War II. He was a Jesuit of German origin living in Limburg (Netherlands), at the time.

Schmitz was a priest in Valkenburg. He is best known for his studies of Phoridae. His collections are in Natuurhistorisch Museum Maastricht (Diptera and Hymenoptera) Museum Alexander Koenig in Bonn (world Phoridae and Lepidoptera from the Canary Islands)

He wrote Phoridae In: E. Lindner, Editor, Die Fliegen der palaearktischen Region (Lieferung 165) 4 (33) (1951) and many scientific papers mostly on this family.

== Bibliography ==
- Schmitz, Hermann. Phorideos ecitophilos de Minas Geraes (Dipt.). Rio de Janeiro: Museu Nacional do Rio de Janeiro, 1924.
- Schmitz, Hermann. Die Phoriden: ihre natürliche Verwandtschaft, ihr System und eine Verbreitungstabelle ihrer europäischen Arten. [S.l.]: [s.n.], 1929.
- Schmitz, Hermann. Revision der Phoriden: nach forschungsgeschichtlichen und nomenklatorischen, systematischen und anatomischen biologischen und faunistischen gesichtspunkten. Berlin: Ferd. Dümmler, 1929.
- Schmitz, H., and A.C. Oudemans. Die Insectenfauna der höhlen von Maastricht und Umgegend: unter besonderer Berücksichtigung der Dipteren. S.l: s.n.], 1909.
- Schmitz, H. Diptera of Patagonia and South Chile: Based Mainly on Material in the British Museum (Natural History) Pt. VI, Pt. VI. Diptera of Patagonia and South Chile. London: British Museum, 1929.
- Schmitz, Hermann. Über einige afrikanische Phoriden (Diptera). Limburg: [s.n.], 1940.
