= Thomas Borgmeier =

Thomas Borgmeier (31 October 1892 – 11 May 1975) was a German-Brazilian priest and entomologist and became a specialist on the ants of Brazil and on the flies in the family Phoridae. He was also the founder of the journals Revista de Entomologia edited it from 1931 to 1951 and the Studia Entomologica from 1958.

Borgmeier was born in Bielefeld, Germany and after studies at the local gymnasium he joined the Franciscan Order of Friars Minor and went to Brazil in 1910. After studying philosophy in Curitiba and theology in Petropolis, he took an interest in ants which was furthered after meeting Professor Herman von Ihering of the Museu Paulista in Sao Paulo. An industrialist in Rio gifted Borgmeier with a binocular microscope and helped with reprints on ants from Ihering's library. Borgmeier was ordained priest in 1918, and while at Petropolis, he saw phorid flies parasitizing ants. Discussing this with Jesuit priest and entomologist Hermann Schmitz led him to publish the first paper on the biology of Odontomachus affinis in 1920 and describe a new species of phorid Dohrniphora brasiliensis. In 1922 Dr Arthur Neiva helped Borgmeier find more time to pursue entomology by allowing him to join the National Museum in Rio de Janeiro as an adjunct research scientist in 1923. Borgmeier became a Brazilian citizen in 1927 and moved to Sao Paulo in 1928 to work under Neiva at the Biological Institute. He moved back to Rio in 1933 and headed the entomology section of the Instituto de Biologia Vegetal for eight years. From 1940 to 1952 he served as a counsellor to the local government and was also in charge of the Vozes publishing house. He retired from the publishing work in 1952 and moved to Jacarepagua where he served as a chaplain at a Catholic institution for blind women. He worked here for twenty years during which time he worked on the systematics of ants in the region. He wrote a monograph on the Ecitonines of the Neotropics and passed on his ant collection to W.W. Kempf. He then worked on the Phoridae of the world.

Borgmeier was given an honorary doctorate by the St. Bonaventure University, New York in 1945. He was awarded the Costa Lima prize in 1962. The Franciscan Order conferred the honorary degree of Lector Generalis Jubilatus in 1965.
