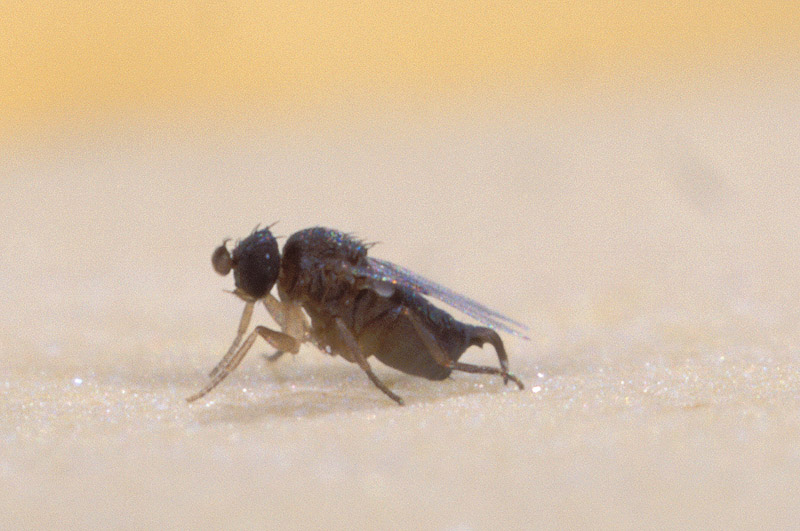
- Pseudacteon sp., with the humped back characteristic of the family

Scientific classification
- Kingdom: Animalia
- Phylum: Arthropoda
- Clade: Pancrustacea
- Class: Insecta
- Order: Diptera
- Section: Aschiza
- Superfamily: Platypezoidea
- Family: Phoridae; Curtis, 1833

Subfamilies
- Aenigmatiinae; Metopininae; Phorinae; Sciadocerinae

= Phoridae =

Phoridae Temporal range: Albian–Recent

Family of flies

The Phoridae are a family of small, hump-backed flies resembling fruit flies. Phorid flies can often be identified by their method of erratically running across a surface instead of taking flight to escape threats. This behaviour is a source of one of their alternate names, the scuttle fly. Another vernacular name, coffin fly, refers to Conicera tibialis. About 4,000 species are known in 230 genera. The most well-known species is cosmopolitan Megaselia scalaris. At 0.4 mm in length, the world's smallest fly is the phorid Euryplatea nanaknihali.

== Description ==
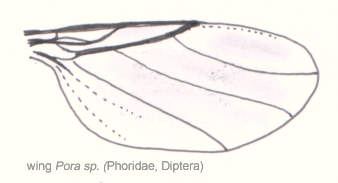
Phora wing venation

Phorid fly larva are minute or small – 0.4–6 mm (1/64–1/4 in) in length. Adult flies typically measure from 2-4mm, but can range from 0.4‒7mm. When viewed from the side, the thorax has a pronounced hump. Their colours range from usually black or brown, to more rarely yellow, orange, pale grey, and pale white.

The head is usually rounded, and in some species narrowed towards the vertex. The vertex is flat. In some species, there is an ocellar protrusion above the surface of the vertex. The eyes are dichoptic. The third segment of the antenna is large and rounded or elongated, and bears a long apical or dorsal arista directed sideways. The arista is glabrous or feathered. The third antennal segment in some species is unique in shape. Sexual dimorphism is often shown in the shape and size of third segment of antennae, and in males, the antennae are usually longer. The proboscis is usually short and sometimes with enlarged labella. The proboscis may be elongated, highly sclerotized, and bent at an angle. Maxillary palpi vary in shape and are sometimes large (species of genus Triphleba). The groups of bristles are developed on the head. Two pairs of supra-antennal bristles, sometimes one, are completely reduced. Above these are antennal bristles closer to (but still some distance from) the margin of eyes. Three bristles are spaced along the margin of eyes-anterolateral midlateral and posterolateral. Immediately before the ocellar callus are two preocellar bristles. The ocellar callus bears a pair of ocellar bristles and in some genera between the antennae and the preocellar bristles two additional, intermediate bristles occur.

The convex mesonotum is usually covered with hairs and rows of bristles. An important taxonomic character is the precise location of the anterior spiracles on the pleura of the thorax. The metapleuron may be entire or divided by a suture into two halves, and either with a few long bristles glabrous, or pubescent. The legs have stout femora and the hind femora are often laterally compressed.

The wings are usually clear, and have a characteristic reduced wing venation with several strong, dark veins crowded towards the base. The strong, well developed radial (R) veins end in the costa about halfway along the wing. The other veins (branches of the medius) are weaker, usually follow a diagonal course, and are often parallel to each other. Crossveins are totally absent. The costa reaches only to the point of confluence of alar margins with veins R4+5 or R5. The ratio of first, second, and third sections of the costa is often a reliable specific character. Other costal indices (compared to other wing measurements) are used in the taxonomy. Two rows of well developed bristles are present on the costa and almost at a right angle to each other. The subcosta is reduced. Of the radial veins, only R1 and R4+5 are developed. R4+5 may furcate at end. R4 and R5 may merge into the alar margin separately or continue as a single vein to the end. Medial veins are represented by M1, M2, and M4. The anal vein may reach the alar margin, or is greatly shortened or almost atrophied.

The abdomen consists of six visible segments. Segments VII to X comprise the genitalia of the male (hypopygium), and in the female the terminalia. In some genera, segments VII to X in the female are highly sclerotized and extended into a tube ("ovipositor"). Segments VII and VIII of the male are more or less sclerotized in the genus Megaselia, but otherwise mostly membranous. Tergite 9 the (epandrium) is highly developed and usually fused at least on one side with the hypandrium (sternite 9). Only in the genus Megaselia is the hypandrium more or less distinctly separated from the epandrium. Unpaired sclerites (ventrites) developed at the distal end of the hypandrium vary in shape. They may be flat, swollen, or other. Sclerites are always present near the base of the cerci, which may be highly developed, and converted either into a tube (anal tube) or a pair of asymmetrical large outgrowths (Phora). The phallosome is rarely complex in structure.

The larva is small, rarely over 10.0 mm long and typically has 12 visible segments. The shape varies from fusiform with inconspicuous projections on posterior segments to short, broad, and flattened with conspicuous dorsal and lateral plumose projections especially on the terminal segment. The colour is whitish, yellowish white, or grey. The first instar is metapneustic, later instars are amphipneustic.

Pupation occurs in the last larval skin which hardens and becomes reddish. The puparium is oval, pointed at ends (because the larval extremities remain relatively unchanged). Abdominal segment 2 has a dorsal pair of long, slender pupal respiratory horns.

== Classification ==
Traditionally, phorids were classified into six subfamilies: Phorinae, Aenigmatiinae, Metopininae (including tribes Beckerinini and Metopinini), Alamirinae, Termitoxeniinae, and Thaumatoxeninae. Disney & Cumming (1992) abolished the Alamirinae when they showed they were the 'missing' males of Termitoxeniinae, which were known only from females.

Also in 1992, Brown presented a revised, cladistic classification based on many new character states. This classification included subfamilies Hypocerinae, Phorinae, Aenigmatiinae, Conicerinae, and Metopininae (Termitoxeniinae and Thaumatoxeninae were not included in his study). Disney rejected the entirety of Brown's work, deeming it premature, and a lively debate ensued. Further resolution of this controversy awaits new data.

The oldest fossils of the family are known from Cretaceous aged amber, with the oldest known being from Early Cretaceous (Albian) French and Spanish amber.

== Biology ==
Phora sp. in copula

Phorid flies are found worldwide, though the greatest variety of species is to be found in the tropics. The Phoridae show the greatest diversity of all the dipterous families. Larvae are found in the nests of social insects and in some aquatic habitats, in organic detritus such as dung, carrion, insect frass, and dead snails. Some are synanthropic. Some species feed on bracket and other fungi and mycelium or on living plants (sometimes as leaf miners). Some are predators or parasites of earthworms, snails, spiders, centipedes, millipedes, and insect eggs, larvae, and pupae. The adults feed on nectar, honeydew, and the juices exuding from fresh carrion and dung. Some adults feed on the body fluids of living beetle larvae and pupae, others prey on small insects. Several species have the common name coffin fly, because they breed in human corpses with such tenacity, they can even continue living within buried coffins. For this reason, they are important in forensic entomology. Most commonly, they feed on decaying organic matter. Because they frequent unsanitary places, including drain pipes, they may transport various disease-causing organisms to food material. The adults are conspicuous on account of their fast and abrupt running. In some species, the males fly in swarms. Megaselia halterata, the mushroom phorid, is a pest of mushroom cultures. Although it does not cause direct damage, it is an efficient vector of dry mould (Lecanicillium fungicola).

== Life cycle ==
Phorid flies develop from eggs into larval, and pupal stages before emerging as adults. The female lays from one to 100 tiny eggs at a time in or on the larval food. She can lay up to 750 eggs in her lifetime. The time it takes from egg to adult varies on the species, but the average is about 25 days.

The larvae emerge in 24 hours and feed for a period between 8 and 16 days, before crawling to a drier spot to pupate. The phorid fly's egg-to-adult life cycle can be as short as 14 days, but may take up to 37 days.

Many species of phorid flies are specialist parasitoids of ants, but several species in the tropics are parasitoids of stingless bees. These affected bees are often host to more than one fly larva, and some individuals have been found to contain 12 phorid larvae.

Other species, especially those of the giant genus Megaselia, develop in various fungi during their larval stage and may be pests of cultivated mushrooms.

== Myrmecophily ==
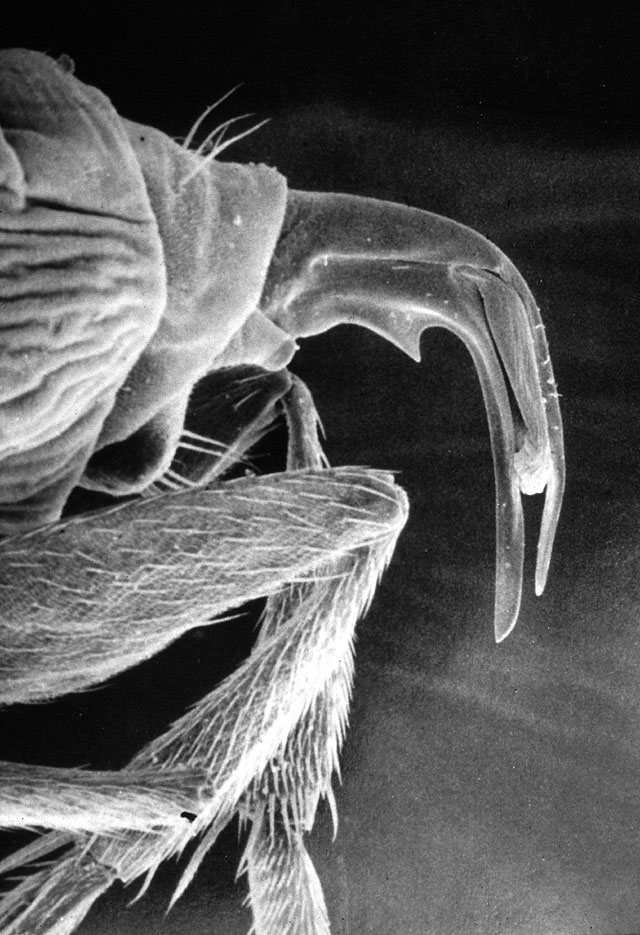
Hooked ovipositor of Pseudacteon curvatus

Many species of phorid flies are known for their commensal or parasitic relationships with ants. Commensal myrmecophilous phorids most often live in waste piles, consuming food discarded by the ants. Parasitoid phorids typically attack foraging ants, using a species-specific strategy to land on a host and inject eggs within seconds using a sharp ovipositor. Some myrmecophilous phorids are kleptoparasites. Adult Metopina formicomendicula and Allochaeta longiciliata flies ride on host workers and use their legs to stimulate the ants' mouthparts, causing food to be regurgitated which the flies can consume. Myrmecophilous phorids may also practice kleptoparasitism as larvae: Metopina pachycondylae larvae use a "sucker-like posterior" to stick a host larva's body and wrap around its neck like a collar; the fly larva steals food given to the host larva by workers and is encased in the host larva's cocoon to pupate alongside it. The nature of the myrmecophily observed in certain species of phorid flies is unknown, such as the recently discovered ant larva-mimicking genus Vestigipoda, which live in brood piles and may feed on ant brood or receive care from nursing workers.

Phorid flies may represent a hopeful means of controlling fire ant populations in the southern United States, where some species of fire ants were accidentally introduced in the 1930s. The genus Pseudacteon, or ant-decapitating flies, of which 110 species have been documented, is a parasitoid of ants. Pseudacteon species reproduce by laying eggs in the thorax of the ant. The first instar larvae migrate to the head, where they feed on the ant's hemolymph, muscle and nerve tissue. Eventually, the larvae completely devour the ant's brain, causing it to wander aimlessly for about two weeks. After about two to four weeks, they cause the ant's head to fall off by releasing an enzyme that dissolves the membrane attaching the ant's head to its body. The fly pupates in the detached head capsule, requiring a further two weeks before emerging. Various species of Phoridae have been introduced throughout the southeast United States, starting with Travis, Brazos, and Dallas Counties in Texas, as well as Mobile, Alabama, where the non-native fire ants first entered North America. The native species of fire ants are also parasitized by some species of Pseudacteon; these native fire ants don't cause ecological damage the way introduced species do. Pseudacteon has a predominantly indirect effect on fire ant populations, as they do not destroy colonies outright by killing off large numbers of ants; rather, the presence of Pseudacteon in the vicinity of foraging trails elicits a significant defensive response which effectively distracts foraging workers and may reduce the colony's competition with native species.

== Colony collapse disorder ==
In January 2012, a researcher discovered larvae in the test tube of a dead honey bee believed to have been affected by colony collapse disorder. The larvae had not been there the night before. The larvae were Apocephalus borealis, a parasitoid fly known to prey on bumblebees and wasps. The phorid fly lays eggs on the bee's abdomen, which hatch and feed on the bee. Infected bees act oddly, foraging at night and gathering around lights like moths. Eventually, the bee leaves the colony to die. The phorid fly larvae then emerge from the neck of the bee.

== Identification ==
- Beyer, E.; Delage, A. Bearbeitet von: Schmitz, H. Phoridae 672 Seiten, 437 Abbildungen, 15 Tafeln, 26x19cm (in Erwin Lindner: Die Fliegen der Paläarktischen Region, Band IV / 7 Teil 1)1981 ISBN 3-510-43023-9
- Borgmeier, T. 1963. Revision of the North American phorid flies. Part I. The Phorinae, Aenigmatiinae, and Metopininae, except Megaselia (Diptera: Phoridae). Stud. Entomol. 6:1–256. Keys subfamilies, genera and species.
- Disney, R. H. L. (1994). Scuttle Flies: The Phoridae. London, Chapman & Hall. ISBN 978-0-412-56520-5.
- Peterson B. V. (1987). Phoridae. In: Manual of Nearctic Diptera. Vol. 2. Canada Department of Agriculture Research Branch, Monograph no. 27, p. 689–712. The full text (53 MB) ISBN 0-660-12125-5 pdf
- K. G. V. Smith, 1989 An introduction to the immature stages of British Flies. Diptera Larvae, with notes on eggs, puparia and pupae. Handbooks for the Identification of British Insects Vol 10 Part 14. pdf download manual (two parts Main text and figures index)

== Other ==
A few cases of phorid flies opportunistically causing human myiasis have been reported.
