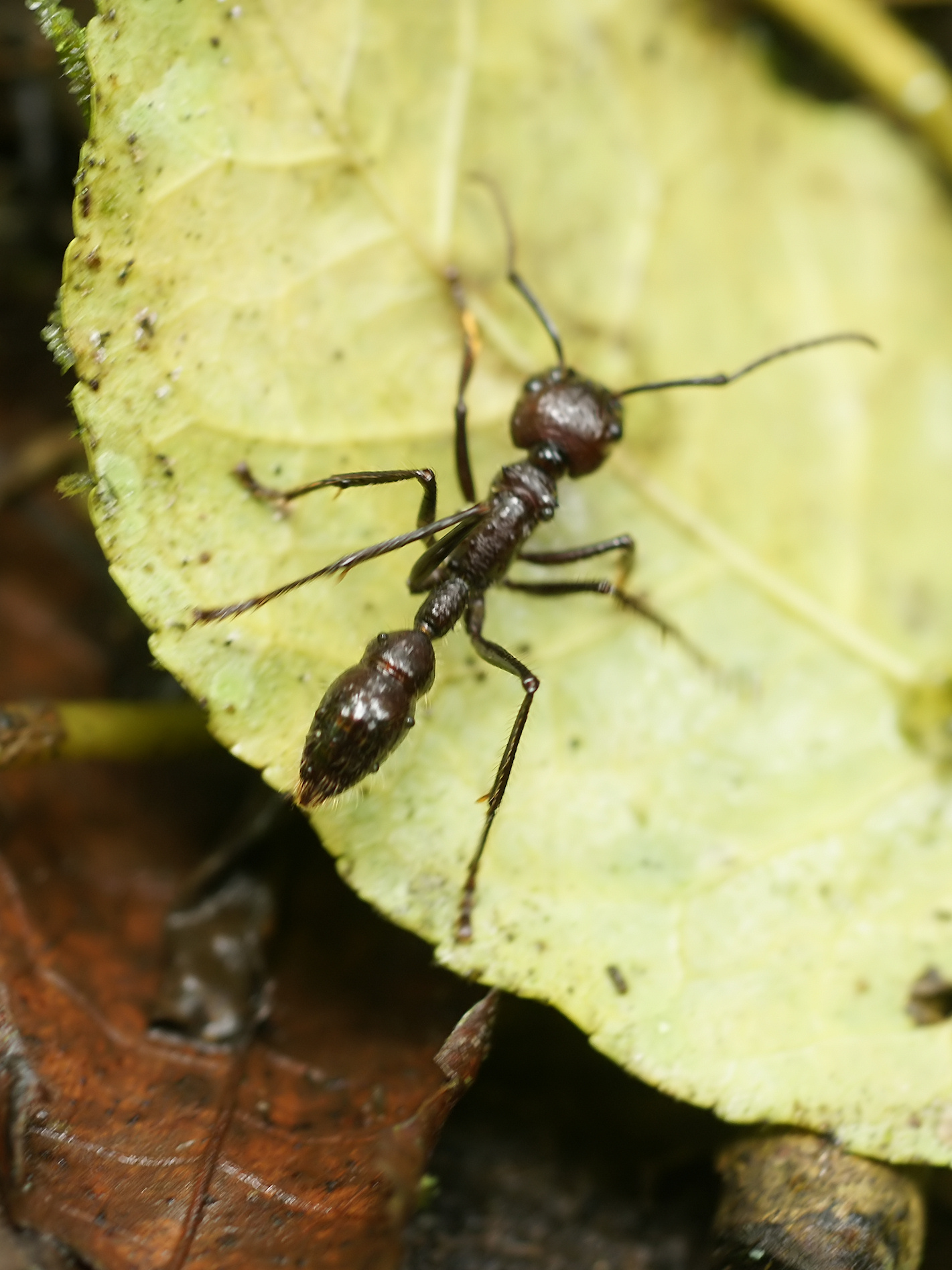

Scientific classification
- Kingdom: Animalia
- Phylum: Arthropoda
- Clade: Pancrustacea
- Class: Insecta
- Order: Hymenoptera
- Family: Formicidae
- Genus: Paraponera
- Species: P. clavata

Binomial name
- Paraponera clavata (Fabricius, 1775)

Synonyms
- Paraponera aculeata (Olivier, 1792); Paraponera tarsalis (Perty, 1833)

= Paraponera clavata =

Species of ant

Paraponera clavata, commonly known as the bullet ant, is a species of ant known for its extremely painful sting. It inhabits humid lowland rainforests in Central and South America.

== Etymology ==
The specific epithet of the ant, clavata, means "club-shaped". The generic name, Paraponera, translates to "near-Ponera". Because of its fearsome reputation, the ant has several Native American, Spanish, and Portuguese local names in different geographical areas; perhaps the best-known of these is the Venezuelan nickname hormiga veinticuatro (the "24 ant" or "24-hour ant"), referring to the full day of pain that follows being stung; it can also refer to the time it takes to kill a human. In Brazil, the Portuguese names given by locals include formiga cabo verde, formigão, or formigão-preto (big black ant); Native American–derived names include tocandira, and tocanquibira, from the Tupi–Guarani tuca-ndy, which translates to "the one wounding deeply". Other names by which it is called include chacha, cumanagata, munuri, siámña, and yolosa. In Costa Rica, P. clavata is known as bala, meaning "bullet". P. clavata also has several common names in English; it is most commonly known as the bullet ant because of the extreme pain it delivers following a sting, similar to that of getting shot. Other names are the "lesser giant hunting ant" and "conga ant".

== Taxonomy ==
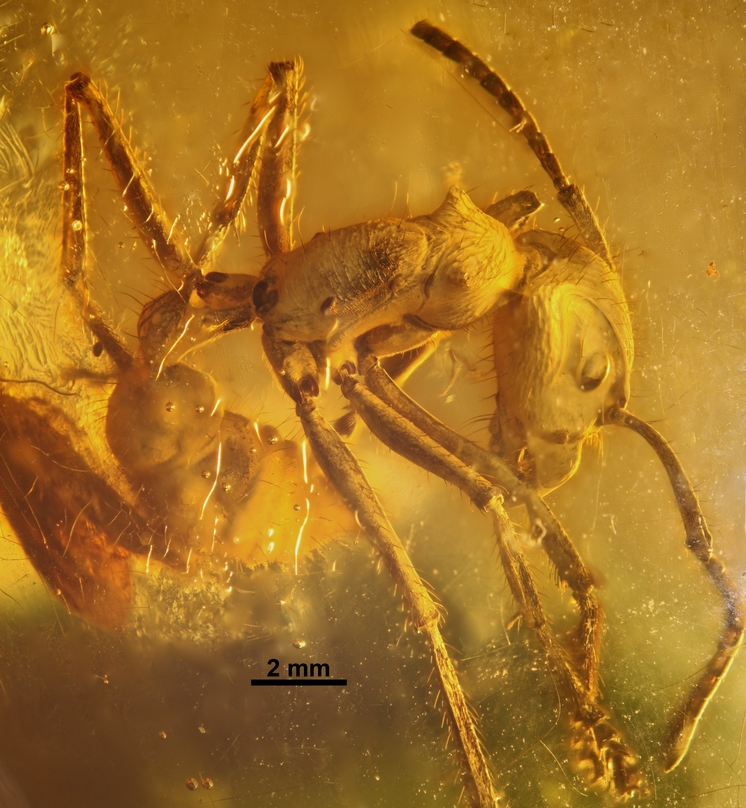
P. dieteri (pictured) is the only known species that is closely related to Paraponera clavata.

Paraponera clavata was first described by Danish zoologist Johan Christian Fabricius in 1775, who named it Formica clavata in his Systema entomologiae. Fabricius listed the type locality as India, incorrectly, as these ants are only found in Central and South America. In 1804, P. clavata was transferred to the genus Ponera by the French zoologist Pierre André Latreille. The genus Paraponera was established by the British entomologist Frederick Smith in 1858, and P. clavata was designated as the type species by monotypy (the creation of a taxonomic group that includes only a single taxon). In his book, Smith synonymised multiple taxa under Paraponera clavata, including Formica armata, Formica spininoda, Ponera tarsalis, and Ponera clavata. Later publications would also synonymise more taxa, including Formica aculeata and Formica clavata. The genus was placed in a monotypic tribe, the Paraponerini, in 1901 by the Italian entomologist Carlo Emery, who stressed the importance of certain morphological characteristics of Paraponera; Emery had also placed the tribe close to the Ectatommini. This classification was accepted by the entomological community until 1958, when the American entomologist William Brown Jr. synonymised Paraponerini and transferred Paraponera to Ectatommini. It was treated as a valid tribe in 1994, but in 2003, the English myrmecologist elevated the rank of the tribe to subfamily level as Paraponerinae, part of the Poneromorph subfamilies.

Under the present classification, the bullet ant is a member of the genus Paraponera in the tribe Paraponerini, subfamily Paraponerinae. It is a member of the family Formicidae, belonging to the order Hymenoptera. It was once the sole member of its own genus and tribe, until the extinct Paraponera dieteri was described in 1994 by the entomologist Cesare Baroni Urbani. The ant, described from Dominican amber, existed during the Early Miocene 15 to 45 million years ago. P. dieteri can be distinguished from P. clavata by its much narrower head, length, pronotum width, petiole width, and other features. The good preservation of the fossil allowed comprehensive comparisons between the two species; the body sculpture of P. dieteri suggests that the genus as a whole exhibits a slow evolutionary rate.

P. clavata is the only living species in its subfamily. Although P. dieteri was the first extinct relative of P. clavata to be described, another Paraponera fossil had been examined earlier in the 1980s. The fossil, which was from the Miocene, was found embedded in Dominican amber from Hispaniola; at the time of discovery, the ant was the largest fossil of its kind. It showed similar characteristics to P. clavata, although it was considerably smaller. The fossil also has biogeographic importance. As P. clavata is not found in the Greater Antilles, but rather in Central and South America, this suggests that moister tropical forests covered the island during the Tertiary period. This is further supported by the fact that P. clavata is a forest ant that forages on the ground and up into bushes and trees.

== Description ==
Worker ants are 18–30 mm (0.7–1.2 in) long and resemble stout, reddish-black wingless wasps. Paraponera is predatory, and like all primitive poneromorphs, does not display polymorphism in the worker caste; the queen ant is not much larger than the workers. They are not aggressive ants but are vicious when defending the nest, they produce a stridulating sound and sting with ferocity.

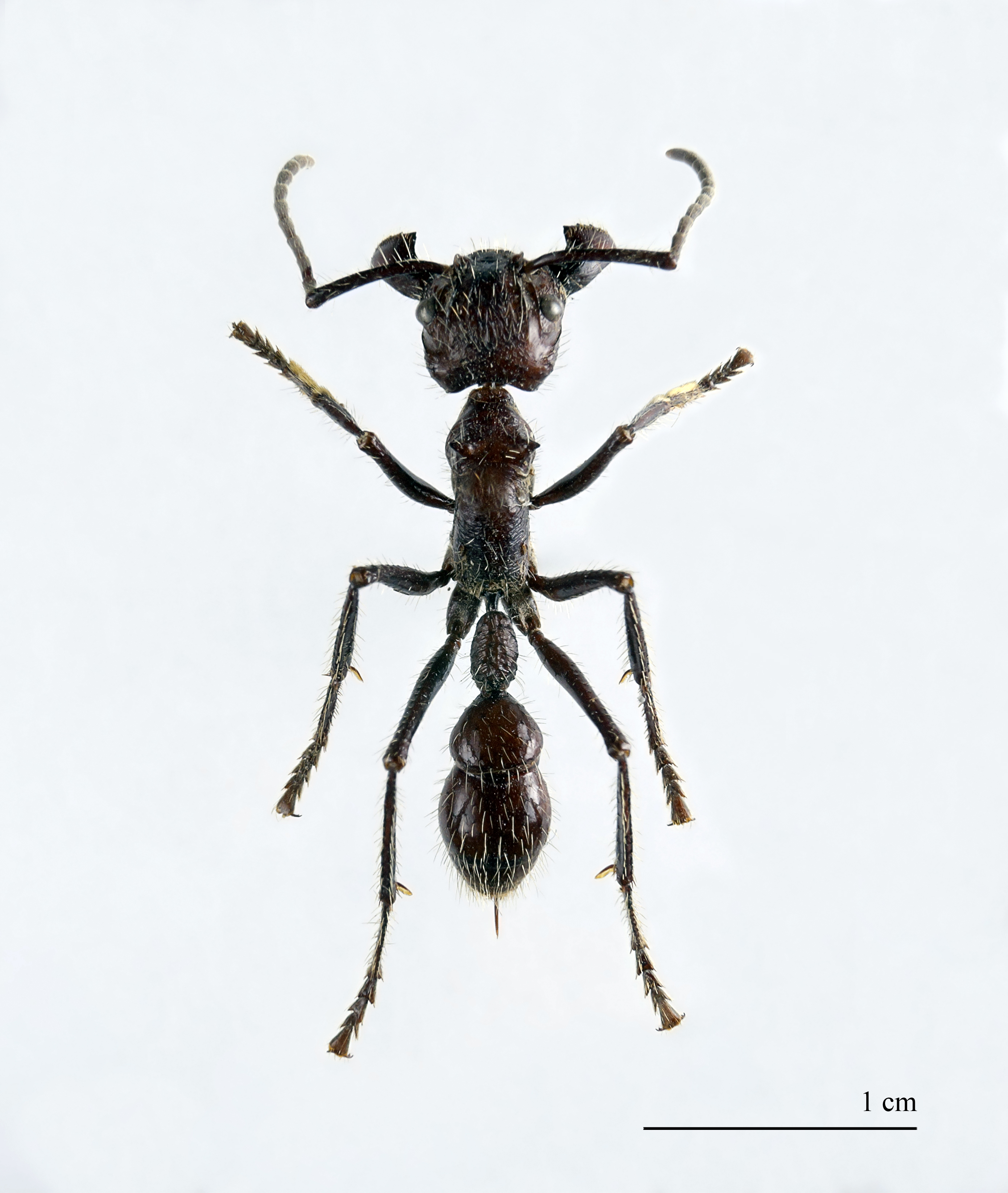
Paraponera clavata – museum specimen

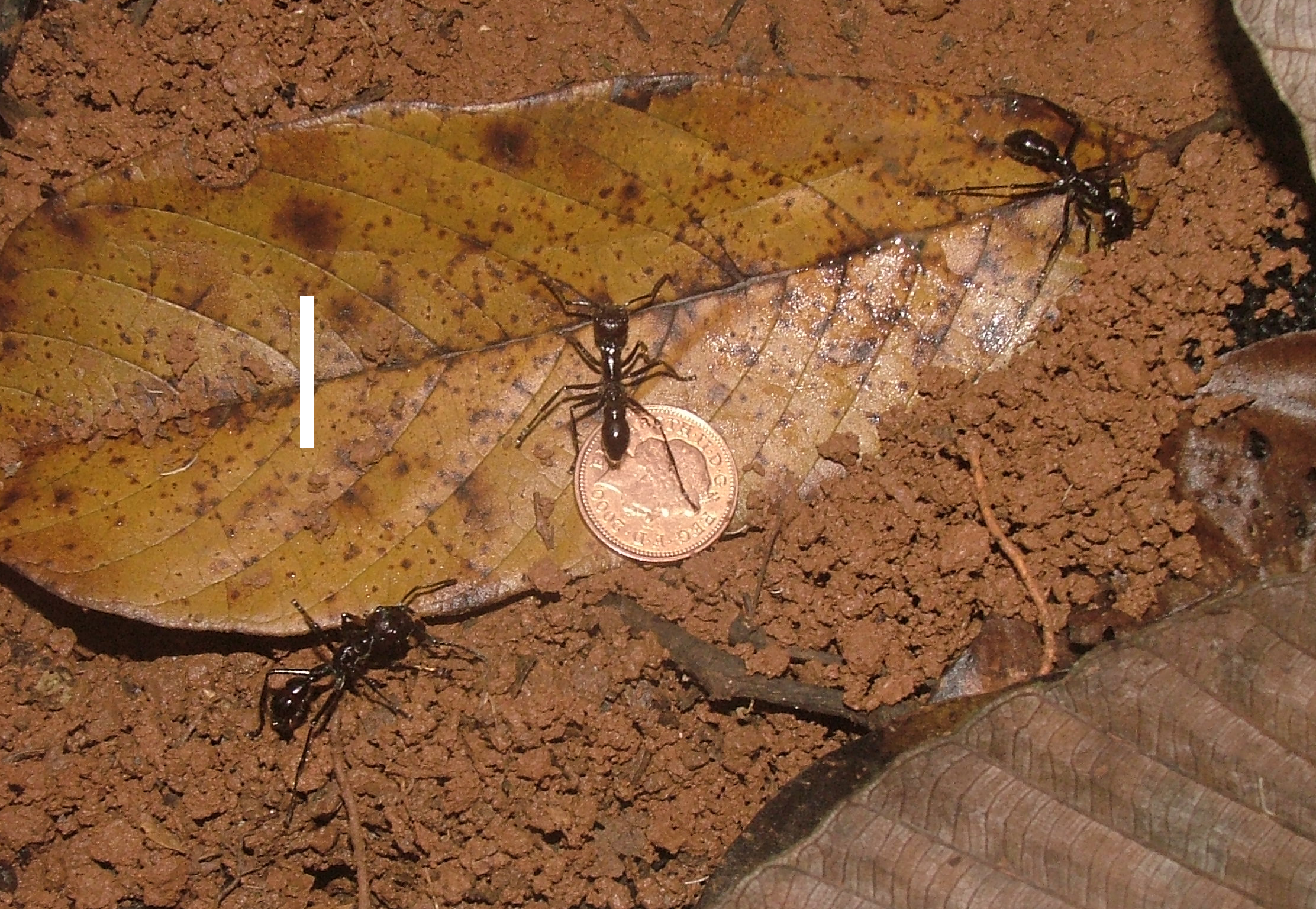
Photograph demonstrating the size of bullet ants, with a 2-cm scale bar

== Distribution ==
Paraponera is distributed throughout Central and South America, commonly found in the wet Neotropical realm. These ants are found in Honduras, El Salvador, Nicaragua, Costa Rica and Panama from the north, and in Venezuela, Colombia, Ecuador, Peru, Bolivia, and Brazil from the south. Colonies are found in lowland areas, at elevations ranging from sea level to 750 metres (2,461 ft). However, specimens have been collected at elevations of 1,500 metres (4,921 ft) in La Amistad International Park.

== Habitat ==
Colonies consist of several hundred individuals and are usually situated at the bases of trees. Workers forage arboreally for small arthropods and nectar in the area directly above the nest, often as far as the upper canopy; little foraging occurs on the forest floor. Nectar, carried between the mandibles, is the most common food taken back to the nest by foragers. Two studies in Costa Rica and on Barro Colorado Island (BCI) found about four bullet ant nests per hectare of forest. On BCI, the nests were found under 70 species of trees, six species of shrubs, two species of lianas, and one species of palm. Nests were most common beneath the canopies of Faramea occidentalis and Trichilia tuberculata, but these trees are also the most abundant in the forest. Nests were present under Alseis blackiana, Tabernaemontana arborea, Virola sebifera, Guarea guidonia, and Oenocarpus mapora more frequently than would be expected from abundance of these tree species. The large number of nest plants suggests little active selection of nest sites by bullet ants. Small shrubs, however, are underused, probably because they do not provide access to the forest canopy. The study on BCI concluded that bullet ants may select trees with buttresses and extrafloral nectaries.

== Enemies ==
The ant is a predator of Greta oto, the glasswing butterfly. This butterfly attempts to combat P. clavata by producing chemical extracts during the larval stage that are unpalatable to these ants.

=== Parasites ===
The small (1.5- to 2.0-mm-long) phorid fly Apocephalus paraponerae is a parasite of injured workers of P. clavata, of which the supply is constant because frequent aggressive encounters occur between neighbouring ant colonies, resulting in maimed workers. The flies are able to parasitise healthy ants if the ants are artificially restrained, but healthy ants are agile and able to repel them. Both male and female flies are attracted by the scent of injured ants; the females lay eggs, as well as feed, and the males feed and possibly mate with the females. The flies are attracted to a crushed ant within two to three minutes, and 10 or more flies may be attracted to each ant. Each ant can harbour 20 fly larvae. Carl Rettenmeyer observed P. clavata actively trying to attack A. paraponerae when they approached the entrance to their nest.

== Relationship with humans ==
=== Sting ===
The bullet ant's sting currently ranks the highest of all insect stings on Justin O. Schmidt's informal sting pain index, at 4.0+. According to Schmidt, the pain is like "Walking over flaming charcoal with a three-inch nail embedded in your heel". Some victims compared the pain to that of being shot, hence the nickname of the insect, "bullet ant". It is described as causing "waves of burning, throbbing, all-consuming pain that continues unabated for up to 24 hours". Lymphadenopathy, edema, tachycardia, and fresh blood appearing in human victim feces are common symptoms from even a single sting. Poneratoxin, a paralyzing neurotoxic peptide isolated from the venom, affects voltage-dependent sodium ion channels and blocks the synaptic transmission in the central nervous system. It is being investigated for possible medical applications.

=== Initiation rites ===
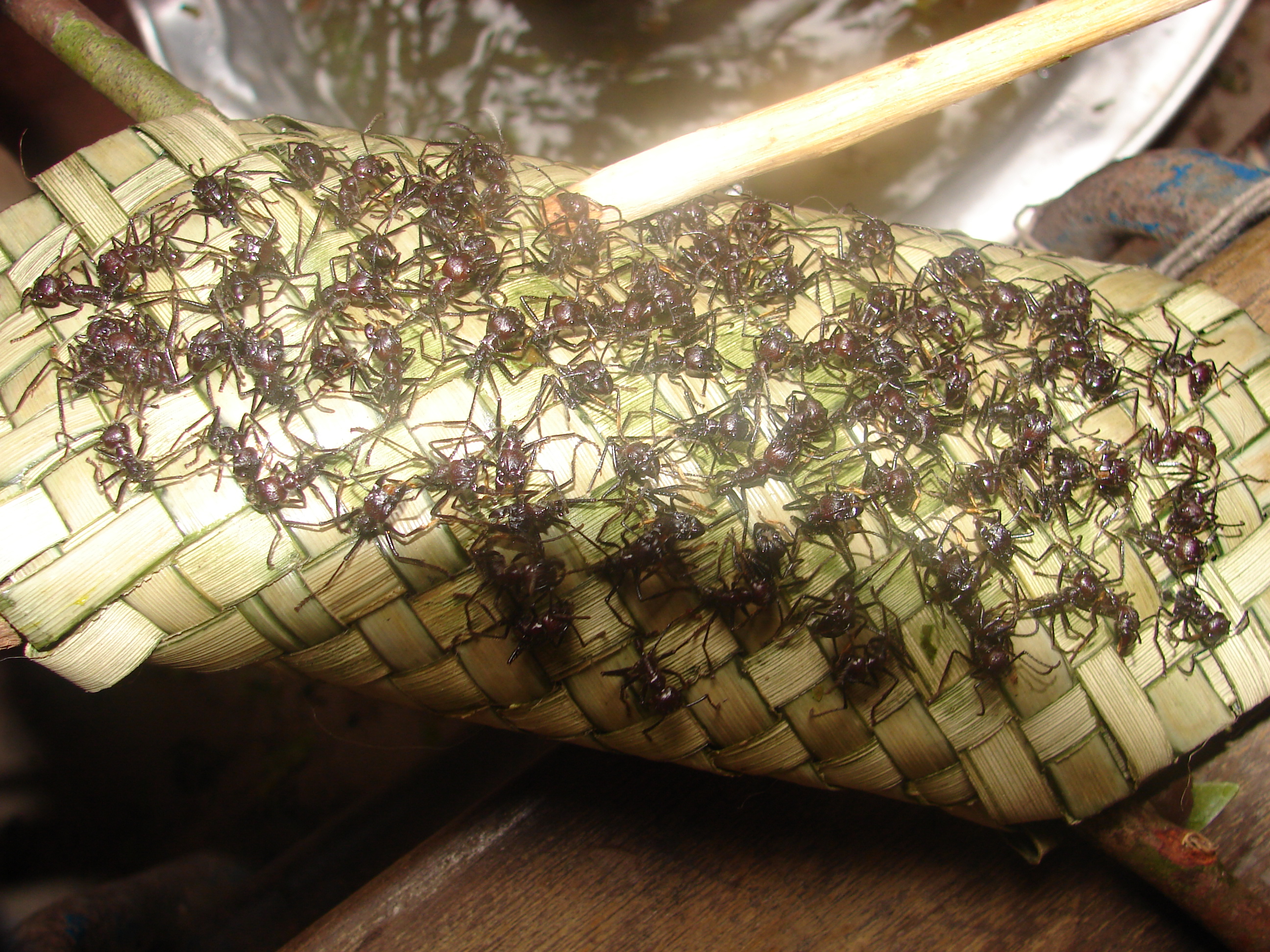
Glove made of palm leaves, used in initiation rites

The Sateré-Mawé people of Brazil use intentional bullet ant stings as part of their initiation rites to become warriors or leaders. The ants are first rendered unconscious by submersion in a natural sedative, and then 80 of them are woven into gloves (which resemble large oven mitts) made of vines or leaves, stingers facing inward. When the ants regain consciousness, an initiator repeatedly blows smoke at the ants, with the objective of making them agitated and aggressive. Once this is done, the initiate has the gloves put on his hands and keeps them on for 5 to 10 minutes or longer. Afterward, the boy's hand and part of his arm are temporarily paralyzed because of the ant venom, and he may shake uncontrollably for days. The only "protection" provided is a coating of charcoal on the hands, supposedly to confuse the ants and inhibit their stinging. To fully complete the initiation, a boy or man must go through the ordeal 20 times over the course of several months or even years.

== See also ==
- Myrmecia, often called bull ants or bulldog ants, also renowned for their powerful sting
- Diacamma rugosum, also known as the Asian bullet ant
- Fire ants
- List of ant genera (alphabetical)
