= List of Apocephalus species =

This is a list of 306 species in the genus Apocephalus, ant-decapitating flies.

== Apocephalus species ==
- Apocephalus absentis Brown, 1993
- Apocephalus acanthus Brown, 2000
- Apocephalus aculeatus Borgmeier, 1925
- Apocephalus adustus Brown, 1993
- Apocephalus aequalis Brown, 2002
- Apocephalus albiapex Brown, 2002
- Apocephalus altapivorus Brown, 1996
- Apocephalus altus Brown, 2002
- Apocephalus amacayacuensis Brown, 2014
- Apocephalus amati Brown, 2014
- Apocephalus amenti Brown, 2014
- Apocephalus amorimi Brown, 2014
- Apocephalus amplexus Brown, 2002
- Apocephalus amplidiscus Brown, 2000
- Apocephalus anacurvus Brown, 2002
- Apocephalus analis Borgmeier, 1958
- Apocephalus ancylus Brown, 1997
- Apocephalus anfractus Brown, 1993
- Apocephalus angularis Borgmeier, 1971
- Apocephalus angusticauda Brown, 1997
- Apocephalus angustinervis Borgmeier, 1961
- Apocephalus angustistylus Brown, 1993
- Apocephalus annulatus Brown, 2000
- Apocephalus antennatus Malloch, 1913
- Apocephalus apivorus Brown, 1996
- Apocephalus aquilonius Brown, 2002
- Apocephalus arachnes Brown, 2002
- Apocephalus aridus Malloch, 1912
- Apocephalus astrictus Brown, 2002
- Apocephalus asymmetricus Brown, 1997
- Apocephalus asyndetus Brown, 2000
- Apocephalus atavus Brown, 1996
- Apocephalus atrimarginatus Brown, 2000
- Apocephalus attophilus Borgmeier, 1928
- Apocephalus aztecae Borgmeier, 1961
- Apocephalus barbarus Brown, 2002
- Apocephalus barbicauda Borgmeier, 1931
- Apocephalus barbiventris Brown, 2000
- Apocephalus batillus Brown, 2000
- Apocephalus bilineatus Brown, 2014
- Apocephalus bilobus Brown, 1997
- Apocephalus bisetus Brown, 1993
- Apocephalus bispinosus Borgmeier, 1928
- Apocephalus borealis Brues, 1924
- Apocephalus brevicercus Brown, 1993
- Apocephalus brevicosta Borgmeier, 1958
- Apocephalus brevifrons Brown, 2000
- Apocephalus brevitergum Brown, 2002
- Apocephalus brochus Brown, 2000
- Apocephalus brunnipes Brown, 1993
- Apocephalus bulbosus Brown, 2002
- Apocephalus camarae Brown, 2014
- Apocephalus camponoti Borgmeier, 1925
- Apocephalus cantleyi Brown, 1997
- Apocephalus carcinus Brown, 2002
- Apocephalus cardiacus Brown, 2000
- Apocephalus catholicus Brown, 2000
- Apocephalus caudatarius (Schmitz, 1915)
- Apocephalus cinereus Brown, 2002
- Apocephalus cingulatus Borgmeier, 1961
- Apocephalus clarilocus Brown, 2002
- Apocephalus clavicauda Brown, 1997
- Apocephalus codonus Corona & Brown, 2004
- Apocephalus collatus Brown, 2002
- Apocephalus colobus Brown, 1997
- Apocephalus colombicus Brown, 1997
- Apocephalus comatus Borgmeier, 1958
- Apocephalus commensuratus Brown, 2002
- Apocephalus comosus Brown, 2000
- Apocephalus completus Brown, 1997
- Apocephalus concavus Brown, 1997
- Apocephalus concisus Brown, 2002
- Apocephalus conecitonis Brown, 2000
- Apocephalus conformalis Brown, 2000
- Apocephalus constrictus Brown, 2000
- Apocephalus contortiventris Brown, 2000
- Apocephalus contracticauda Brown, 2000
- Apocephalus coquilletti Malloch, 1912
- Apocephalus crassilatus Brown, 2000
- Apocephalus crassus Brown, 1996
- Apocephalus criniventris Brown, 2014
- Apocephalus crucicauda Borgmeier, 1928
- Apocephalus ctenicoxa Brown, 2002
- Apocephalus cultellatus Borgmeier, 1961
- Apocephalus cuneatus Borgmeier, 1958
- Apocephalus curtinotus Brown, 2000
- Apocephalus curtus Brown, 1993
- Apocephalus curvipes Borgmeier, 1958
- Apocephalus cyathus Brown, 2002
- Apocephalus cyclodiscus Brown, 2000
- Apocephalus deceptus Brown, 2000
- Apocephalus decurvus Brown, 1997
- Apocephalus denotatus Brown, 2000
- Apocephalus densepilosus Borgmeier, 1971
- Apocephalus dichocercus Borgmeier, 1958
- Apocephalus dichromatus Brown, 1997
- Apocephalus diffusus Brown, 1997
- Apocephalus digitalis Borgmeier, 1971
- Apocephalus dinoponerae Brown, 2000
- Apocephalus disparicauda Borgmeier, 1962
- Apocephalus divergens Borgmeier, 1971
- Apocephalus dracodermus Brown, 2000
- Apocephalus dubitatus Borgmeier, 1971
- Apocephalus echinatus Brown, 1996
- Apocephalus ecitonis Borgmeier, 1928
- Apocephalus emargilatus Brown, 2000
- Apocephalus emphysemus Brown, 1996
- Apocephalus epicautus Brown, 2002
- Apocephalus euryacanthus Brown, 2014
- Apocephalus eurydomus Brown, 2000
- Apocephalus euryterminus Brown, 2002
- Apocephalus extraneus Brown, 1997
- Apocephalus facettalis Borgmeier, 1961
- Apocephalus facis Brown, 1997
- Apocephalus feeneri Disney, 1982
- Apocephalus fenestratus Brown, 2000
- Apocephalus fernandezi Brown, 2002
- Apocephalus flexiseta Brown, 2002
- Apocephalus flexus Brown, 2000
- Apocephalus frameatus Brown, 2002
- Apocephalus funditus Brown, 2000
- Apocephalus fusciapex Brown, 2002
- Apocephalus fuscipalpis Borgmeier, 1958
- Apocephalus gemellus Borgmeier, 1963
- Apocephalus gemursus Brown, 1993
- Apocephalus gigantivorus Brown, 2000
- Apocephalus glabriventris Brown, 2000
- Apocephalus globosus Brown, 2000
- Apocephalus glomerosus Brown, 2002
- Apocephalus gonzalezae Brown, 2014
- Apocephalus gracilis Brown, 1993
- Apocephalus grandiflavus Brown, 1994
- Apocephalus grandipalpis Borgmeier, 1925
- Apocephalus guapilensis Brown, 1997
- Apocephalus hansoni Brown, 1993
- Apocephalus hibbsi Brown, 1997
- Apocephalus hippurus Brown, 2002
- Apocephalus hirsutus Brown, 1997
- Apocephalus hirtifrons Peterson & Robinson, 1976
- Apocephalus hispidus Borgmeier, 1958
- Apocephalus holdenae Brown, 2014
- Apocephalus horridus Borgmeier, 1963
- Apocephalus hystricosus Brown, 2002
- Apocephalus inaffectus Brown, 2002
- Apocephalus incomptus Brown, 2000
- Apocephalus indeptus Brown, 2000
- Apocephalus indistinctus Brown, 2000
- Apocephalus infradentatus Borgmeier, 1961
- Apocephalus infraspinosus Borgmeier, 1961
- Apocephalus inimicus Borgmeier, 1961
- Apocephalus inpalpabilis Brown, 2000
- Apocephalus insignis Borgmeier, 1961
- Apocephalus insolitus Borgmeier, 1967
- Apocephalus insulanus Borgmeier, 1969
- Apocephalus intonsus Brown, 2000
- Apocephalus kungae Brown, 2000
- Apocephalus laceyi Disney, 1981
- Apocephalus lamellatus Borgmeier, 1971
- Apocephalus lanceatus Borgmeier, 1925
- Apocephalus laselvaensis Brown, 1997
- Apocephalus latiapex Brown, 2002
- Apocephalus laticauda Borgmeier, 1958
- Apocephalus latinsulosus Brown, 2000
- Apocephalus lativentris Brown, 1997
- Apocephalus lemniscus Brown, 1996
- Apocephalus leptotarsus Brown, 1993
- Apocephalus limai Prado, 1976
- Apocephalus lizanoi Brown, 1996
- Apocephalus lobicauda Brown, 2000
- Apocephalus longimanus Brown, 2012
- Apocephalus longimucrus Brown, 2012
- Apocephalus longipes Borgmeier, 1958
- Apocephalus longistylus Brown, 1993
- Apocephalus lunatus Brown, 1997
- Apocephalus luteihalteratus Borgmeier, 1923
- Apocephalus lyratus Borgmeier, 1971
- Apocephalus maculicauda Borgmeier, 1961
- Apocephalus maculosus Brown, 2000
- Apocephalus magnicauda Brown, 2000
- Apocephalus malignus Disney & Michailovskaya, 2002
- Apocephalus marginatus Borgmeier, 1925
- Apocephalus marinhoi Brown, 2014
- Apocephalus medius Brown, 2002
- Apocephalus megalops Brown, 1996
- Apocephalus melinus Brown, 2000
- Apocephalus meniscus Brown, 2000
- Apocephalus mesacanthus Brown & LeBrun, 2010
- Apocephalus mexacanthus Brown, 2014
- Apocephalus mexicanus Borgmeier, 1969
- Apocephalus micrepelis Brown, 1993
- Apocephalus minutus Borgmeier, 1958
- Apocephalus miricauda Borgmeier, 1971
- Apocephalus missouriensis Brown, 2012
- Apocephalus modesta Borgmeier, 1963
- Apocephalus moraviensis Brown, 1993
- Apocephalus mortifer Borgmeier, 1937
- Apocephalus mucronatus Borgmeier, 1958
- Apocephalus neivai Borgmeier, 1931
- Apocephalus niger Malloch, 1935
- Apocephalus nigricauda Brown, 1997
- Apocephalus nitifrons Brown, 1994
- Apocephalus niveus Brown, 1996
- Apocephalus normenti Prado, 1976
- Apocephalus oblongus Brown, 1997
- Apocephalus obscurus Borgmeier, 1923
- Apocephalus occidentalis Brown, 1997
- Apocephalus octonus Brown, 1997
- Apocephalus onorei Brown, 1997
- Apocephalus opimus Brown, 2002
- Apocephalus orbiculus Brown, 2000
- Apocephalus pachycondylae Brown, 2000
- Apocephalus paldiae Brown, 2000
- Apocephalus palposus Borgmeier, 1963
- Apocephalus papei Brown, 2014
- Apocephalus paracanthus Brown, 2014
- Apocephalus parallelus Brown, 1997
- Apocephalus paraponerae Borgmeier, 1958
- Apocephalus parvifurcatus Enderlein, 1912
- Apocephalus parvus Disney, 2007
- Apocephalus patulus Brown, 1997
- Apocephalus paulus Borgmeier, 1963
- Apocephalus peniculatus Borgmeier, 1925
- Apocephalus pergandei Coquillett, 1901
- Apocephalus persecutor Borgmeier, 1961
- Apocephalus petiolus Brown, 2000
- Apocephalus pilatus Brown, 1996
- Apocephalus piliventris Borgmeier, 1925
- Apocephalus pittadearaujoi Brown, 2014
- Apocephalus planus Brown, 2002
- Apocephalus platycauda Brown, 2002
- Apocephalus platypalpis Borgmeier, 1925
- Apocephalus pluteus Brown, 2002
- Apocephalus ponderosus Brown, 2002
- Apocephalus praedator Borgmeier, 1971
- Apocephalus pristinus Brown, 1993
- Apocephalus prolatus Brown, 1993
- Apocephalus prolixus Brown, 1996
- Apocephalus pseudocercus Brown, 1997
- Apocephalus quadratus Brown, 1997
- Apocephalus quadriglumis Borgmeier, 1961
- Apocephalus radiatus Brown, 2002
- Apocephalus reburrus Brown, 2002
- Apocephalus rectisetus Brown, 2014
- Apocephalus reticulatus Brown, 2000
- Apocephalus riccardae Brown, 2014
- Apocephalus rionegrensis Borgmeier, 1928
- Apocephalus ritualis Brown, 1997
- Apocephalus roeschardae Brown, 2000
- Apocephalus rotundus Brown, 2002
- Apocephalus rudiculus Brown, 1997
- Apocephalus rugosus Brown, 2002
- Apocephalus sagittarius Borgmeier, 1971
- Apocephalus satanus Brown, 1994
- Apocephalus scaurus Corona & Brown, 2004
- Apocephalus secundus Brown, 1996
- Apocephalus securis Brown, 1997
- Apocephalus secus Brown, 2000
- Apocephalus setialvus Brown, 1993
- Apocephalus setilobus Brown, 1997
- Apocephalus setimargo Borgmeier, 1971
- Apocephalus setissitergus Brown, 2012
- Apocephalus setitarsus Brown, 1997
- Apocephalus setiventris Borgmeier, 1971
- Apocephalus sharkeyi Brown, 2002
- Apocephalus silvestrii Borgmeier, 1971
- Apocephalus similis Malloch, 1912
- Apocephalus sincerus Brown, 2002
- Apocephalus singulus Brown, 1997
- Apocephalus sinuosus Brown, 1997
- Apocephalus spatulatus Borgmeier, 1958
- Apocephalus spatulicauda Borgmeier, 1961
- Apocephalus spiculus Brown, 2000
- Apocephalus spinilatus Brown, 1997
- Apocephalus spinosus Brown, 1997
- Apocephalus staurotus Brown, 2002
- Apocephalus stillatus Brown, 1997
- Apocephalus strazhnikae Brown, 2014
- Apocephalus strazhnikae Brown, 2014
- Apocephalus striativentris Brown, 2000
- Apocephalus striatus Brown, 1997
- Apocephalus strongylus Brown, 2000
- Apocephalus succineus Brown, 2000
- Apocephalus sulcatus Borgmeier, 1963
- Apocephalus superatus Brown, 2002
- Apocephalus tanyurus Brown, 2000
- Apocephalus tenuipes Borgmeier, 1963
- Apocephalus tenuitarsus Brown, 1997
- Apocephalus torulus Brown, 2000
- Apocephalus triangularis Brown, 2000
- Apocephalus trichocoxa Borgmeier, 1925
- Apocephalus tricuspis Borgmeier, 1961
- Apocephalus trifidus Brown, 2000
- Apocephalus trisetus Brown, 1993
- Apocephalus tritarsus Brown, 1993
- Apocephalus truncaticercus Brown, 1993
- Apocephalus unitarsus Brown, 1993
- Apocephalus vangus Brown, 2002
- Apocephalus vannus Brown, 1997
- Apocephalus velutinus Borgmeier, 1958
- Apocephalus vibrissicauda Brown, 1997
- Apocephalus vicinus Borgmeier, 1925
- Apocephalus vicosae Disney & Braganca, 2000
- Apocephalus wallerae Disney & Braganca, 2000
- Apocephalus weissi Brown, 2012
- Apocephalus wheeleri Brues, 1903
- Apocephalus wirthi Borgmeier, 1963
- Apocephalus xavierfilhoi Brown, 2014
