= Ta3a =

Neurotoxin produced by species of ant

Delta-myrmicitoxin-Ta3a
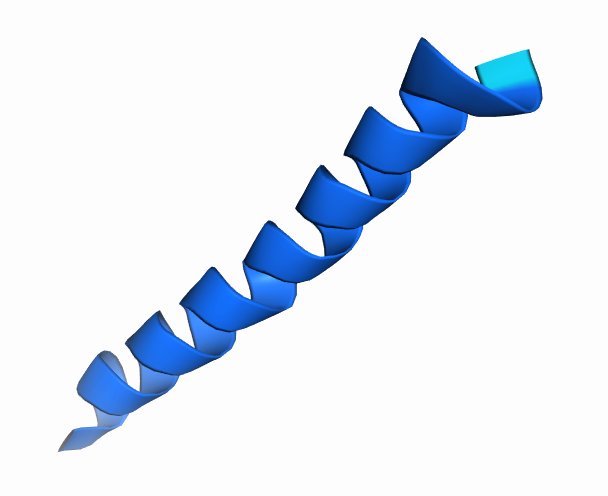
- Ta3a structure prediction from AlphaFold

Identifiers
- Organism: Tetramorium africanum
- Symbol: ?
- UniProt: P0DX61
Search for
- Structures: Swiss-model
- Domains: InterPro

Ta3a
Identifiers
3D model (JSmol)	Interactive image
- InChI: InChI=1S/C159H248N36O38/c1-26-89(20)129(155(229)175-105(55-57-128(204)205)138(212)173-103(43-35-36-58-160)137(211)186-118(75-126(164)202)149(223)184-116(72-98-48-52-101(199)53-49-98)151(225)192-130(90(21)27-2)156(230)176-106(132(165)206)74-125(163)201)191-150(224)115(71-97-46-50-100(198)51-47-97)183-148(222)117(73-99-76-166-80-168-99)185-139(213)104(54-56-124(162)200)174-142(216)108(63-83(8)9)177-134(208)93(24)170-153(227)122-44-38-60-195(122)159(233)119(68-88(18)19)188-152(226)121(79-197)190-147(221)114(70-96-41-33-30-34-42-96)182-141(215)107(62-82(6)7)172-127(203)77-167-136(210)120(78-196)189-146(220)112(67-87(16)17)181-145(219)111(66-86(14)15)180-144(218)110(65-85(12)13)179-143(217)109(64-84(10)11)178-133(207)92(23)169-140(214)113(69-95-39-31-29-32-40-95)187-157(231)131(91(22)28-3)193-154(228)123-45-37-59-194(123)158(232)94(25)171-135(209)102(161)61-81(4)5/h29-34,39-42,46-53,76,80-94,102-123,129-131,196-199H,26-28,35-38,43-45,54-75,77-79,160-161H2,1-25H3,(H2,162,200)(H2,163,201)(H2,164,202)(H2,165,206)(H,166,168)(H,167,210)(H,169,214)(H,170,227)(H,171,209)(H,172,203)(H,173,212)(H,174,216)(H,175,229)(H,176,230)(H,177,208)(H,178,207)(H,179,217)(H,180,218)(H,181,219)(H,182,215)(H,183,222)(H,184,223)(H,185,213)(H,186,211)(H,187,231)(H,188,226)(H,189,220)(H,190,221)(H,191,224)(H,192,225)(H,193,228)(H,204,205)/t89-,90-,91-,92-,93-,94-,102-,103-,104-,105-,106-,107-,108-,109-,110-,111-,112-,113-,114-,115-,116-,117-,118-,119-,120-,121-,122-,123-,129-,130-,131-/m0/s1 Key: IAQFHRWWIJXKQC-SWRHZYTASA-N
- SMILES: N[C@@]([H])(CC(C)C)C(=O)N[C@@]([H])(C)C(=O)N1[C@@]([H])(CCC1)C(=O)N[C@@]([H])([C@]([H])(CC)C)C(=O)N[C@@]([H])(Cc1ccccc1)C(=O)N[C@@]([H])(C)C(=O)N[C@@]([H])(CC(C)C)C(=O)N[C@@]([H])(CC(C)C)C(=O)N[C@@]([H])(CC(C)C)C(=O)N[C@@]([H])(CC(C)C)C(=O)N[C@@]([H])(CO)C(=O)NCC(=O)N[C@@]([H])(CC(C)C)C(=O)N[C@@]([H])(Cc1ccccc1)C(=O)N[C@@]([H])(CO)C(=O)N[C@@]([H])(CC(C)C)C(=O)N1[C@@]([H])(CCC1)C(=O)N[C@@]([H])(C)C(=O)N[C@@]([H])(CC(C)C)C(=O)N[C@@]([H])(CCC(=O)N)C(=O)N[C@@]([H])(CC1=CN=C-N1)C(=O)N[C@@]([H])(Cc1ccc(O)cc1)C(=O)N[C@@]([H])([C@]([H])(CC)C)C(=O)N[C@@]([H])(CCC(=O)O)C(=O)N[C@@]([H])(CCCCN)C(=O)N[C@@]([H])(CC(=O)N)C(=O)N[C@@]([H])(Cc1ccc(O)cc1)C(=O)N[C@@]([H])([C@]([H])(CC)C)C(=O)N[C@@]([H])(CC(=O)N)C(=O)N

Properties
Chemical formula	C_{159}H_{248}N_{36}O_{38}
Molar mass	3271.947 g·mol^{−1}
- Except where otherwise noted, data are given for materials in their standard state (at 25 °C [77 °F], 100 kPa). Infobox references

Ta3a (Delta-myrmicitoxin-Ta3a) is a vertebrate-selective neurotoxin found in the venom of the African ant species Tetramorium africanum. It is known to cause intense, long-lasting pain by targeting voltage-gated sodium channels in peripheral sensory neurons. Ta3a strongly reduces sodium channel inactivation, leading to heightened neuronal excitability.

== Chemistry ==
Ta3a belongs to the aculeatoxin family of peptides, found in the venom of Hymenoptera. It is a 29-residue peptide, which is predicted to have an alpha-helical structure (amino acid sequence: LAPIFALLLLSGLFSLPALQHYIEKNYIN). Ta3a is similar to poneratoxin, a voltage-gated sodium channel toxin found in the ant species Paraponera clavata, as well as to other uncharacterised peptides from various other ant species.

== Target ==
Ta3a targets voltage-gated sodium channels such as Na_{v}1.6, Na_{v}1.7 and Na_{v}1.8, which are involved in peripheral pain signaling. The half-maximal effective concentration (EC50) of Ta3a for the human Na_{v}1.7 channel is 30 ± 9 nM. Na_{v}1.6 is similarly sensitive to Ta3a with an EC50 of 25 ± 2 nM, while Na_{v}1.8 is less sensitive with an EC50 of 331 ± 58 nM.

== Mode of action ==
Ant venom Na_{v} toxins are distinct from other Na_{v} modulators, but their effects more closely resemble those caused by small hydrophobic alkaloids. These peptides bind to the S2 voltage-sensing domain of Na_{v} channels in their "activated" conformation, thereby maintaining channel activity. Ta3a exerts a significant regulatory effect on voltage-gated sodium channels, and its interaction with the Na_{v}1.7 subtype was the one studied in more detail. Ta3a prolongs the duration that the channels remains active and increases the likelihood of the channels being open. Additionally, Ta3a shifts the activation of Na_{v}1.7 to more negative (hyperpolarized) potentials, allowing Na_{v}1.7 channels to remain active for extended periods even in the absence of strong depolarising stimuli. These prolonged, non-inactivating currents cause significant changes in the cell's membrane potential, due to the continuous sodium influx. Such prolonged sodium channel activation also permits sodium currents to persist at negative membrane potentials.

== Toxicity ==
The hallmark of Ta3a toxicity is acute pain, which is the most immediate and prominent symptom of Ta3a exposure. This is due to the excessive activation of the Na_{v} channels, which play a crucial role in pain transmission by enhancing the propagation of nerve signals, particularly pain-related signals.

== Treatment ==
Since Ta3a primarily exerts its effects by overactivating the Na_{v} channels, sodium channel blockers represent a potential therapeutic approach. For instance, tetrodotoxin (TTX), a sodium channel blocker, has been shown to effectively inhibit the persistent currents induced by Ta3a in experimental settings. However, no studies have yet been conducted on specific treatment methods for Ta3a poisoning.
