= Rm4a =

Ion channel toxin

Identifiers
3D model (JSmol)	Interactive image
- InChI: InChI=1S/C148H225N33O33/c1-22-84(17)121(143(209)163-100(52-54-120(188)189)129(195)178-123(88(21)183)145(211)162-98(43-32-33-55-149)127(193)171-110(69-92-72-155-97-42-31-30-41-95(92)97)139(205)177-122(85(18)23-2)144(210)164-101(124(153)190)71-118(152)186)176-138(204)109(68-91-47-49-94(184)50-48-91)170-137(203)111(70-93-73-154-76-157-93)172-128(194)99(51-53-117(151)185)161-132(198)104(61-79(7)8)165-126(192)87(20)159-141(207)114-44-34-56-179(114)147(213)112(65-83(15)16)174-140(206)113(75-182)175-136(202)108(67-90-39-28-25-29-40-90)169-131(197)102(59-77(3)4)160-119(187)74-156-125(191)86(19)158-130(196)103(60-78(5)6)166-133(199)105(62-80(9)10)167-134(200)106(63-81(11)12)168-135(201)107(64-82(13)14)173-142(208)115-45-35-57-180(115)148(214)116-46-36-58-181(116)146(212)96(150)66-89-37-26-24-27-38-89/h24-31,37-42,47-50,72-73,76-88,96,98-116,121-123,155,182-184H,22-23,32-36,43-46,51-71,74-75,149-150H2,1-21H3,(H2,151,185)(H2,152,186)(H2,153,190)(H,154,157)(H,156,191)(H,158,196)(H,159,207)(H,160,187)(H,161,198)(H,162,211)(H,163,209)(H,164,210)(H,165,192)(H,166,199)(H,167,200)(H,168,201)(H,169,197)(H,170,203)(H,171,193)(H,172,194)(H,173,208)(H,174,206)(H,175,202)(H,176,204)(H,177,205)(H,178,195)(H,188,189)/t84-,85-,86-,87-,88+,96-,98-,99-,100-,101-,102-,103-,104-,105-,106-,107-,108-,109-,110-,111-,112-,113-,114-,115-,116-,121-,122-,123-/m0/s1 Key: IHCPOAKCAQXAIQ-YTDULZKGSA-N
- SMILES: N[C@@]([H])(Cc1ccccc1)C(=O)N1[C@@]([H])(CCC1)C(=O)N1[C@@]([H])(CCC1)C(=O)N[C@@]([H])(CC(C)C)C(=O)N[C@@]([H])(CC(C)C)C(=O)N[C@@]([H])(CC(C)C)C(=O)N[C@@]([H])(CC(C)C)C(=O)N[C@@]([H])(C)C(=O)NCC(=O)N[C@@]([H])(CC(C)C)C(=O)N[C@@]([H])(Cc1ccccc1)C(=O)N[C@@]([H])(CO)C(=O)N[C@@]([H])(CC(C)C)C(=O)N1[C@@]([H])(CCC1)C(=O)N[C@@]([H])(C)C(=O)N[C@@]([H])(CC(C)C)C(=O)N[C@@]([H])(CCC(=O)N)C(=O)N[C@@]([H])(CC1=CN=C-N1)C(=O)N[C@@]([H])(Cc1ccc(O)cc1)C(=O)N[C@@]([H])([C@]([H])(CC)C)C(=O)N[C@@]([H])(CCC(=O)O)C(=O)N[C@@]([H])([C@]([H])(O)C)C(=O)N[C@@]([H])(CCCCN)C(=O)N[C@@]([H])(CC(=CN2)C1=C2C=CC=C1)C(=O)N[C@@]([H])([C@]([H])(CC)C)C(=O)N[C@@]([H])(CC(=O)N)C(=O)N

Properties
Chemical formula	C_{148}H_{225}N_{33}O_{33}
Molar mass	2994.626 g·mol^{−1}

Related compounds
Related compounds	Rm4b
- Except where otherwise noted, data are given for materials in their standard state (at 25 °C [77 °F], 100 kPa). Infobox references

Rm4a is a toxin found in the venom of the Australian green-head ant (Rhytidoponera metallica), which is used for self-defense. Upon administration, Rm4a causes immediate pain by disrupting the normal function of the voltage-gated sodium channels in mammalian peripheral sensory neurons, differing from other ion channel toxins in the ant venom.

== Etymology ==
The name ectatotoxin-Rm4a (Rm4a) comes from the Australian green head-ant species, Rhytidoponera metallica (Rm), from the Ectatomminae subfamily, and from the isoform number of the venom peptide (4a), following the conventional venom naming in toxicology.

== Sources ==
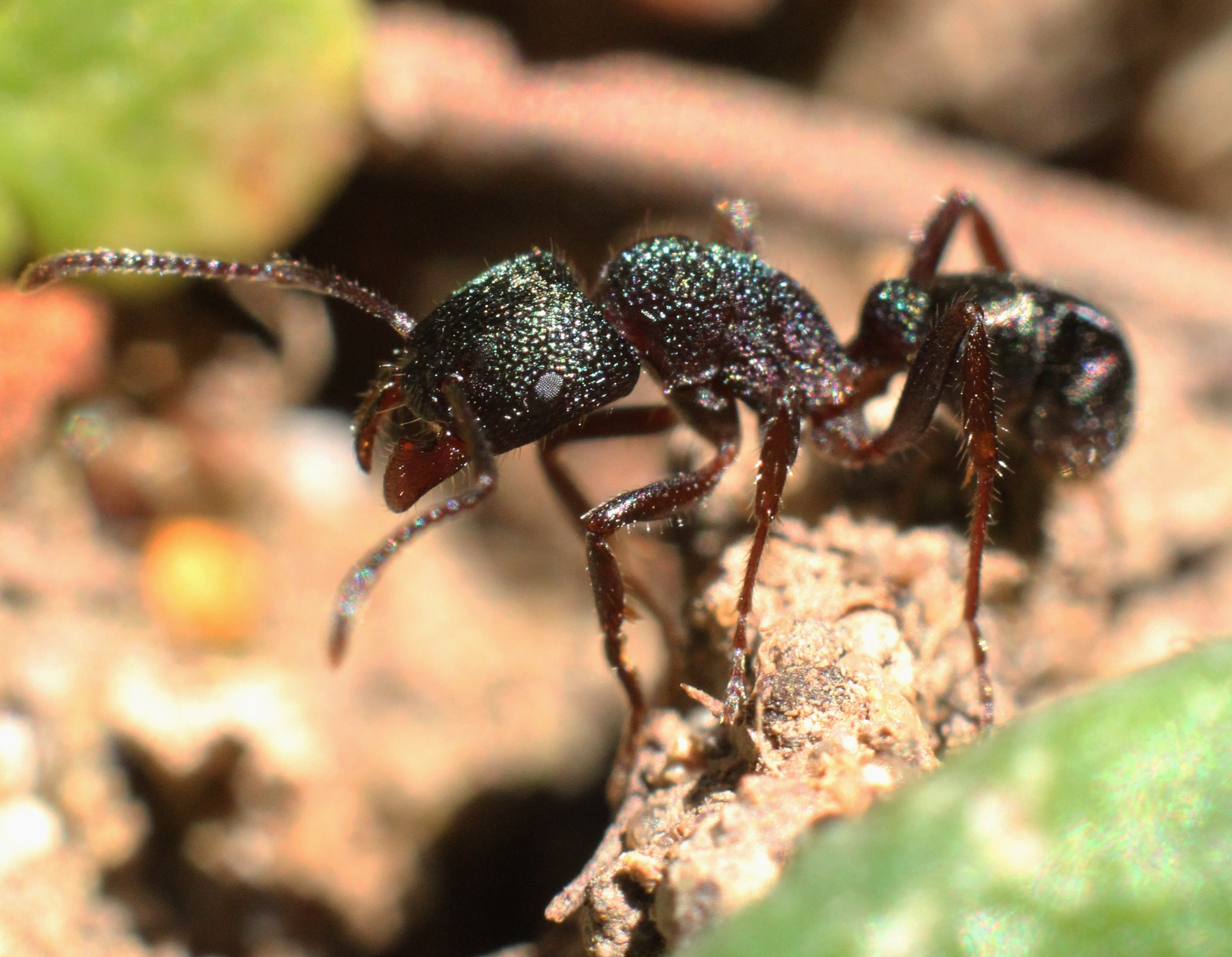
Rhytidoponera metallica

The peptide toxin Rm4a is one of more than 100 distinct peptides produced by the Australian green-head ant (Rhytidoponera metallica). This ant is known for its metallic-coloured green or blue sheen, which makes it easily recognizable.

== Chemistry ==
=== Structure ===
The ectatoxin Rm4a is a relatively small peptide that consists of 26 amino acids: FPPLLLLAGLFSLPALQHYIETKWIN-NH2. It has a molecular mass under 6 kDa, consistent with the majority of R. metallica peptide venom components. Unlike many animal venom peptides, Rm4a does not have cysteine residues. Its lysine-rich structure provides positive charge and amphipathic properties, enabling the peptide to interact with the lipid membrane and ion channel of mammalians. The C-terminal region of Rm4a is amidated, which neutralizes the terminal carbonyl group and increases chemical stability of its structure. Together, Rm4a's chemical structure provides support for its selective modulation of vertebrate voltage-gated sodium channels.

=== Homology and family ===
The venom of R. metallica consists predominantly of peptides derived from the aculeatoxin gene superfamily. As a mature peptide, Rm4a shares high sequence similarity (63-71%) with pain-inducing peptides from other ant species. Within R. metallica venom, Rm4a shares biophysical features (lysine and hydrophobic-rich sequences) with other aculeatoxins that facilitate amphipathic helix formation. Rm4a clusters within vertebrate-selective sodium channel modulators with other homologous toxins (e.g., Ta3a, Pm1a, and Mri1a) from other ant species. These peptides evolved under selection pressure for defense against vertebrate predators.

== Target ==
Rm4a targets mammalian voltage-gated sodium (Na_{V}) channels; including Na_{V}1.6, Na_{V}1.7, Na_{V}1.8, and Na_{V}1.9. and it functions primarily as a vertebrate-selective defensive toxin that causes sustained nociception in mammals. The affinity of Rm4a for different voltage-gated sodium channels varies. Rm4a exhibits the highest affinity and potency in human NaV (hNa_{V}) 1.6 (EC50 = 196 ± 23 nM), and lower affinity in hNaV1.7 (EC50 = 1.9 ± 0.4 μM) and hNaV1.8 (EC50 = 8.4 ± 1.0 μM). Although Rm4a modulation of hNa_{V}1.6 has a greater amplitude than hNa_{V}1.7, the effects of Rm4a on both currents are similar at the same toxin concentration.

== Mode of action ==
Rm4a action involves the modulation of TTX-sensitive voltage-gated sodium (Na_{V}) channels in vertebrate peripheral sensory neurons that are responsible for pain-signaling. Rm4a induces a shift in the activation voltage to a more negative level (hyperpolarizing shift) on Na_{V}1.7 and a strong reduction and slowing of inactivation which leads to increased neuronal excitability. These Na_{V} channel toxins act on the neurotoxin receptor site 2, which bind to the activated state of sodium channels and cause sustained activation already at resting membrane potential.

The function of Rm4a to cause nocifensive behaviours in mammals suggested that it has a defensive role for the species. For example, Rm4a triggers immediate and prolonged increase calcium in dorsal root ganglion (DRG) neurons in mammals but is inactive in insects at high doses.

== Toxicity, symptoms and treatment ==
Testing of Rm4a in blowflies (Lucilia caesar), fruit flies (Drosophila melanogaster), and house crickets (Acheta domesticus) showed that Rm4A does not have insecticidal properties. When Rm4a was intrathoracically injected in blowflies, no paralysis or mortality was observed even in high dosages (200 nmol/g). Intrathoracic injections of Rm4a in fruit flies and house crickets (40 nmol/g) do not show any visible effects. Intraplantar injection of Rm4a (20 to 200 pmol) in mice induces spontaneous nocifensive behavior similar to the observed Australian green-head ant sting cases in humans.

Rm4a is considered a mild toxin and the sting is typically characterized by pain, redness, swelling and itching lasting for several days. In some individuals it can create allergic reaction leading to anaphylactic shock with symptoms of swelling in face, tongue and lips, causing nausea and breathing difficulty. In some cases, the sting might also elicit hyperhidrosis, piloerection, and axon reflex flare in the affected area. There is no specific treatment available for the effects of Rm4a, however, the pain caused by the sting of Rhytidoponera metallica is managed by cleaning the wound area, applying cold compress, pain relievers, and antihistamines.

== Therapeutic use ==
Rm4a is a strong algogenic (pain-inducing) toxin, and it is not currently used as a therapeutic agent. It is used in research to study biological pain mechanisms and sodium channels, mainly Na_{V}1.6 and Na_{V}1.7.
