= Poneromorph subfamilies =

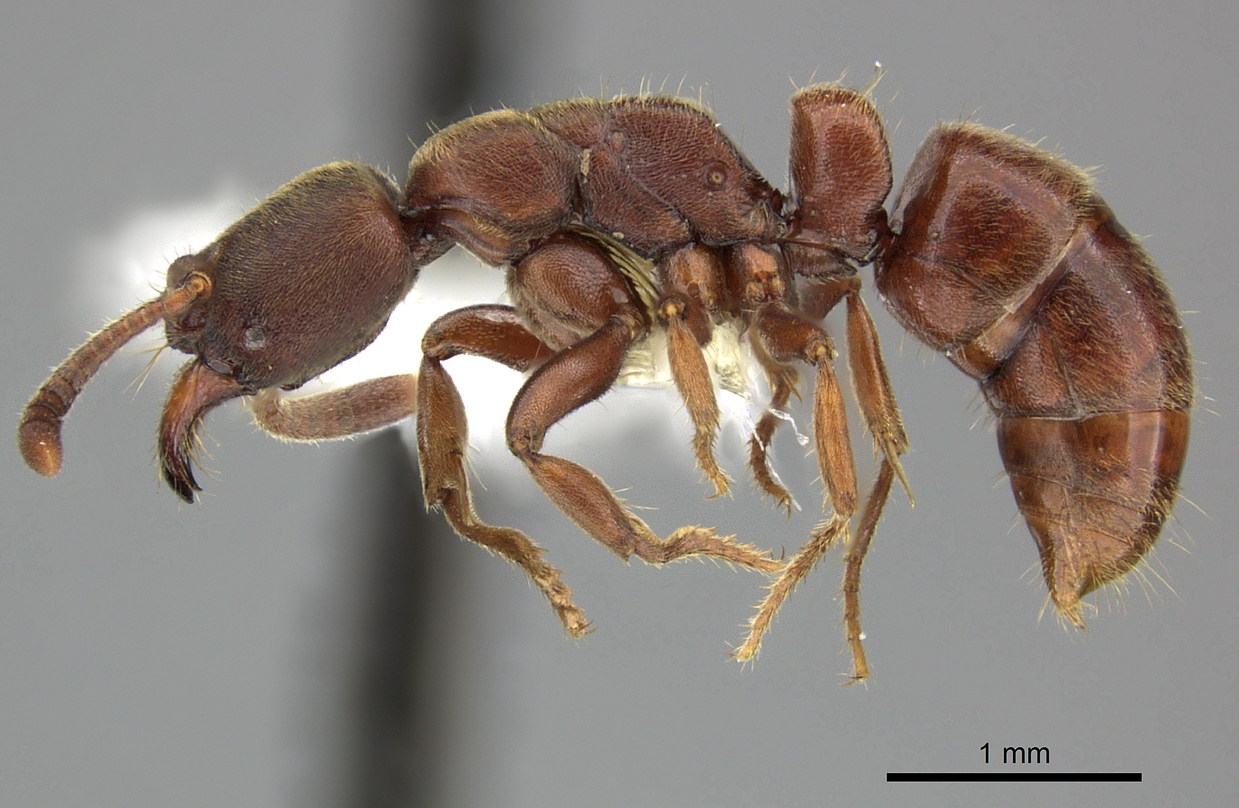
Specimen of the poneromorph ant Rasopone ferruginea

Poneromorph subfamilies are subdivisions of the traditional ant subfamily Ponerinae, with several former tribes now elevated to subfamily rank. According to this analysis, some ponerine groups may be more closely related to other subfamilies than to each other. The subfamilies of "poneromorph" Formicidae include:

- Amblyoponinae
- Ectatomminae (apparently related to the widely distributed and highly diverse Myrmicinae)
- Heteroponerinae
- Paraponerinae
- Ponerinae (in a much more restricted sense)
- Proceratiinae.

Long considered primitive on the basis of retention of a typical hymenopteran sting and pupae in cocoons, some groups among the poneromorphs exhibit considerable specialization in predatory habits and mandibular form.

These two evolutionary developments are often, but not necessarily, seen in association: elongated mandibles with modified teeth for handling large and potentially toxic prey in Amblyopone and Thaumatomyrmex, and strongly modified "snap-jaws" and associated musculature in the generalized predator Odontomachus.

Most poneromorphs are strict predators just like their ancestors (stinging Hymenoptera). Foraging for extrafloral nectar and honeydew from sap-sucking insects has secondarily evolved in Ectatomminae and Paraponerinae, as well as Odontomachus (Ponerinae). A taste for sweets (nectar, fruit) can be considered an evolutionary "advancement" among the ants.
