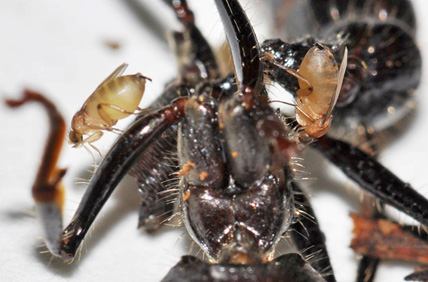
- Bloated, non-gravid “feeder” females of Apocephalus paraponerae Borgmeier on an injured Paraponera clavata F. ant at La Selva Biological Station, Costa Rica

Scientific classification
- Kingdom: Animalia
- Phylum: Arthropoda
- Class: Insecta
- Order: Diptera
- Family: Phoridae
- Genus: Apocephalus
- Species: A. paraponerae

Binomial name
- Apocephalus paraponerae Borgmeier, 1958

= Apocephalus paraponerae =

Species of fly

Apocephalus paraponerae is a species of fly in the family Phoridae discovered by Borgmeier in 1958. This species is a parasitoid of the giant tropical ant Paraponera clavata (commonly known as the bullet ant) and uses both visual and chemical cues to locate its host. A. paraponerae can locate fighting or injured ants through host-produced alarm pheromones. Female flies are attracted to the ant to feed and oviposit, while males are attracted to feed and locate females for mating. There is some evidence that suggests that A. paraponerae is a cryptic species complex of at least four genetically distinct species.

== Description ==
In 2001, it was suggested that A. paraponerae may be a cryptic species complex of at least four genetically distinct, but morphologically indistinguishable species of flies that attack several different ant hosts. Evidence for this claim includes the fact that host-location cues used by A. paraponerae to locate two of the host species differ. Furthermore, these two ant species differ consistently in body size. In addition, mtDNA analysis reveals high sequence divergence between populations, but low sequence divergence within populations.

== Anatomy ==
=== Larvae ===
The larva of A. paraponerae generally resembles that of other, related phorids. However, A. paraponerae larvae possess an unusual anterior crosspiece joining the cornua of the cephalopharyngeal skeleton.

=== Adult ===
Adult A. paraponerae are small phorids that are about 1.5-2.0 mm long. Notably, female flies possess modified, sclerotized ovipositors which are used to deposit eggs in adult P. clavata.

== Distribution and habitat ==
The geographic range of A. paraponerae is generally coextensive with that of its host, P. clavata. They both occupy the neotropical region and are widespread in the lowland rainforests of Brazil, Nicaragua, Costa Rica, and northern Argentina.

== Life history ==
The A. paraponerae life cycle begins when an adult female deposits eggs in a P. clavata worker ant. Egg hatching and larval development occur very rapidly following oviposition.

=== Oviposition ===
Upon discovering an injured ant, A. paraponerae females repeatedly probe the ant's body with their ovipositors, focusing primarily on sutures, areas of overlap between sclerites, and ruptures in sclerites. When laying eggs, females completely extend their ovipositors, allowing the egg to pass through the female reproductive tract.

=== Eggs ===
While most parasitic members of the Apocephalus family deposit only single eggs into their hosts, A. paraponerae females typically deposit more than one egg per host. Furthermore, several flies may deposit eggs into a single host. Compared to other phorids, the A. paraponerae egg stage is extremely short, usually lasting only 6.5–7 hours.

=== Larvae ===
A. paraponerae larvae develop rapidly within hosts, emerging about 48 hours after hatching. Because females typically deposit several eggs into a single host, and several flies may deposit eggs into the same host, it is not uncommon for up to 20-25 larvae to develop successfully from a single host.

=== Pupae ===
The pupal stage of A. paraponerae occurs outside of the host and lasts around 17–26 days, which is much longer than that of other phorids. The long pupal stage may compensate in some way for the very short larval stage. After this long period of pupation, A. paraponerae ecloses as adults.

=== Adult ===
The life history of adult A. paraponerae resembles that of both a parasitoid and a scavenger. Both male and female flies are attracted to injured P. clavata to feed on wounds. After oviposition, females frequently feed on fluid oozing out of oviposition wounds. Males may be attracted to injured ants not only to feed but also to mate with female flies that are attracted to those ants.

== Food resources and parasitism ==
=== Host range ===
An experimental test of potential host range in A. paraponerae showed that adults were able to develop successfully in seven species in four genera: Paraponera clavata (the natural host), Pachycondyla villosa, P. apicalis, O. opaciventris, E. tuberculatum, E. ruidum, and P. obscuricornis. The number of eggs that developed into pupa differed across host species. Pachycondyla apicalis had the highest percent success of puparia, and P. clavata had the second-highest percent success. The success of larval development in species other than the natural host suggests that larvae are not highly adapted to P. clavata hosts. However, ant species in the subfamilies Myrmicinae and Formicinae were not suitable for larval development, indicating a taxonomic limit to host range.

=== Host finding ===
A. paraponerae utilize both visual and chemical cues to locate injured or freshly killed hosts for feeding and egg-laying. These injuries species are often the result of interspecies aggression and serve as ideal hosts for A. paraponerae to lay their egg on. Studies have shown that A. paraponerae can distinguish among different ants based on body size. When ant workers of varying species and sizes were treated with hexane to remove species-specific chemical signatures, A. paraponerae was found to prefer larger P. clavata over other tested species. In addition to visual cues, A. paraponerae are also attracted to 4-methyl-3-heptanone and 4-methyl-3-heptanol, which are major products of the mandibular glands of the host ant P. clavata. As these chemicals are released by fighting, injured, and freshly killed workers, A. paraponerae may use these pheromones to locate suitable targets for feeding or egg-laying. In an experiment, A. paraponerae were found to be equally attracted to ants that were treated with hexane, but unwilling to lay eggs on them. This suggests that A. paraponerae is either unwilling or unable to lay eggs on ants lacking the characteristic chemical signals of 4-methyl-3-heptanone and 4-methyl-3-heptanol. More research is necessary on additional host-finding cues, as A. paraponerae are not attracted to other ant species with the same mandibular gland components as P. clavata.

==== Geographic variation in host-finding cues ====
Research conducted at Barro Colorado Island (BCI) in Panama and La Selva Biological Research Station in Costa Rica demonstrated geographic variation in host-finding cues. A. paraponerae used 4-methyl-3-heptanone and 4-methyl-3-heptanol as a host location cue at La Selva, but did not do so at BCI. This is the first reported example of geographic variation in host finding cues in a phorid parasitoid.
