= Diacamma indicum =

Scientific classification
- Kingdom: Animalia
- Phylum: Arthropoda
- Clade: Pancrustacea
- Class: Insecta
- Order: Hymenoptera
- Family: Formicidae
- Genus: Diacamma
- Species: D. indicum

Binomial name
- Diacamma indicum Santschi, 1920

Species of ant

Diacamma indicum, also known as Indian queenless ant, is a species of ant of the subfamily Ponerinae. It is found from India, Sri Lanka, and Bangladesh.

Distribution and Nesting

This species thrives in a variety of habitats and displays remarkable nesting flexibility. Colonies inhabit simple, mostly subterranean nests consisting of a single chamber and entrance, often accompanied by a secondary tunnel. During monsoon seasons, these ants construct elevated nest mounds, raising the nest entrance by an average of 3.4 cm and narrowing the opening to reduce water intrusion.
