= Apocephalus coquilletti =

Scientific classification
- Kingdom: Animalia
- Phylum: Arthropoda
- Class: Insecta
- Order: Diptera
- Family: Phoridae
- Genus: Apocephalus
- Species: A. coquilletti

Binomial name
- Apocephalus coquilletti Malloch, 1912

Synonyms
- Apocephalus pictus Malloch, 1918

Species of insect

Apocephalus coquilletti is a species of scuttle flies (insects in the family Phoridae). It has been witnessed attacking ants of the genus Camponotus.
