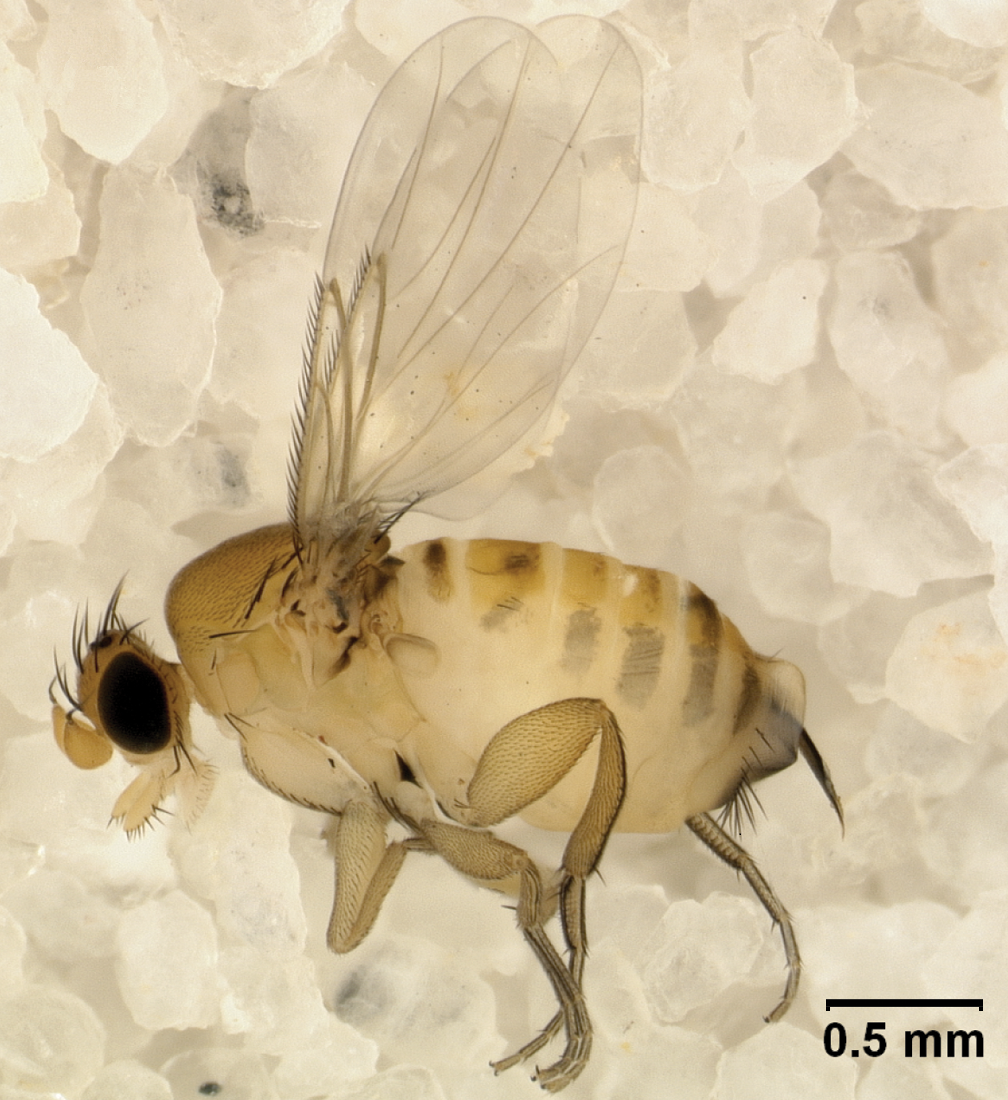
- Adult female A. borealis with visible ovipositor alongside grains of sugar for size comparison

Scientific classification
- Kingdom: Animalia
- Phylum: Arthropoda
- Class: Insecta
- Order: Diptera
- Family: Phoridae
- Genus: Apocephalus
- Species: A. borealis

Binomial name
- Apocephalus borealis Brues, 1924

= Apocephalus borealis =

Species of fly

Apocephalus borealis is a species of North American parasitoid phorid fly that attacks bumblebees, honey bees, and paper wasps. This parasitoid's genus Apocephalus is best known for the "decapitating flies" that attack a variety of ant species, though A. borealis attacks and alters the behavior of bees and wasps. These flies are colloquially known as zombie flies and the bees they infect are colloquially known as zombees. Association with honey bees has so far only been documented from California, South Dakota, Oregon, Washington, British Columbia (Vancouver Island), and Vermont.

== History ==
This phorid fly is native to North America, attacking bumble bees and paper wasps. The infection of European honey bees in North America by A. borealis is a recent development that was first discovered by Dr. John Hafernik, who collected some dead specimens near a light source at San Francisco State University's campus. These were placed in a vial and forgotten. About a week later larvae emerged from the dead bees.

It is hypothesized that the bumble bee is A. borealis's native host but may have a host shift to the honeybee. This is shown because A. borealis tend to parasitize bumble bees more often than honeybees because the bumble bee's larger size allows for greater reproductive success. However, some regions have a greater population of honeybees, which increases the chances of a successful A. borealis infection Information is insufficient to explain why the parasitic fly jumped to its new host, but concern exists that this new host provides an opportunity for the fly to thrive and further threaten the decreasing honey bee population. To identify this fly, DNA barcoding was used, demonstrating that the phorids that emerged from Apis and Bombus had no more than 0.2% (1 bp) divergence among samples. What variation was found was from among those phorids reared from honey bees, rather than between flies reared from honey bees versus bumble bees. Other analyses gave similar results, including morphological criteria, sequencing of 18S rRNA genes, and cross-infection of honey bees using phorids that had emerged from both honeybees and bumblebees, thus confirming that the phorids attacking honey bees are the same species as those attacking bumble bees.

== As a vector for pathogens ==
It has been shown that this parasite can reduce a bumble bee's lifespan by up to 70%. To make matters worse for the infected hosts, microarray analyses of honey bees from infected hives reveal that these bees are often infected with deformed wing virus and Nosema ceranae. Both larvae and adult phorids have tested positive for these pathogens, implicating the fly as a potential vector or reservoir host of these honey bee pathogens. A. borealis has also been suggested to be a possible vector promoting the spread of the pathogens responsible for colony collapse disorder.

== Life cycle ==
Eggs are laid in the abdomen of the bee; when the larvae hatch, they feed on flight muscles in the thorax and hemolymph. Development of larvae takes an average of one week. Mature fly larvae typically emerge from the host between the head and thorax (but rarely result in decapitation), and the larvae pupate outside the host body. About 28 days are needed for the entire life cycle. Infected bees can be found walking in circles, as well as losing the ability to stand. Disorientation is likely caused by mechanical interference or by pressure of the growing larvae on the internal organs and nervous system. Inactivity during the daytime, along with activity during cold or inclement weather, has been observed in infected bees.

Hive abandonment, particularly at night, has been implicated as a behavior modification of A. borealis. Reasons for abandoning the hive remain unclear. Researchers hypothesized that infected bees may be ejected by their hive mates, with chemosensory particles playing a possible role in detection of infected bees. It is also possible that infected bees altruistically remove themselves from the hive in efforts to stop the spread of disease to the bee colony.

A bee leaving the hive and going towards a light source at night has yet to be observed. However, many dead bees have been observed near light sources, and when collected many of these bees show evidence of being parasitized, leading to the conclusion that parasitized bees might be drawn to light sources at night. The mechanisms of this phenomenon have yet to be analyzed, but possible culprits are mechanical interference of the larvae growing within the bee or a response to chemical signals the larvae are emitting in the bee.

== Effect of seasons ==
The rates of infection in honey bees fluctuate as A. borealis populations increase and decline over the seasons. No adults of the fly were found within hives, indicating that phorids do not survive in large numbers in the late winter when foraging bees are inactive.

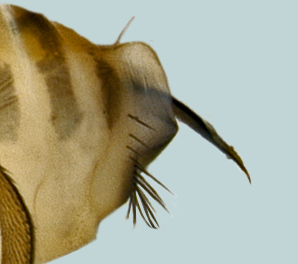
Ovipositor of an A. borealis

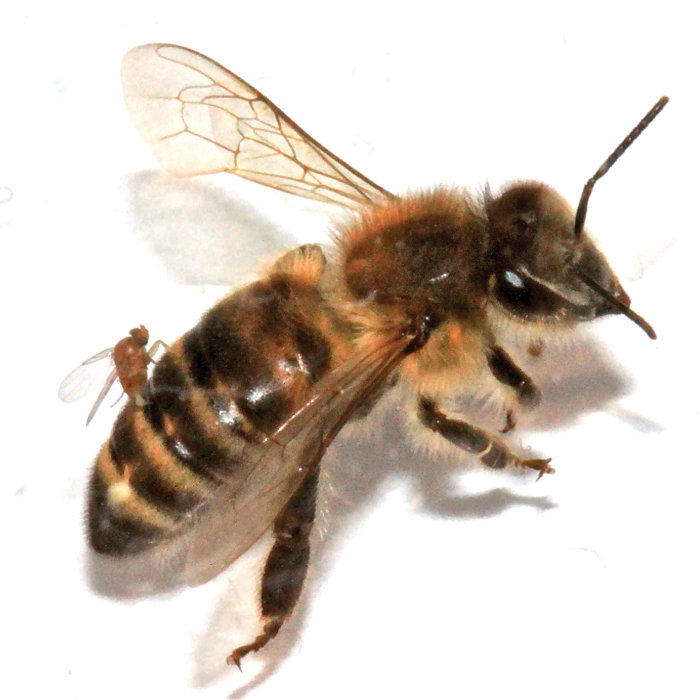
Female A. borealis ovipositing eggs into the abdomen of a worker honey bee

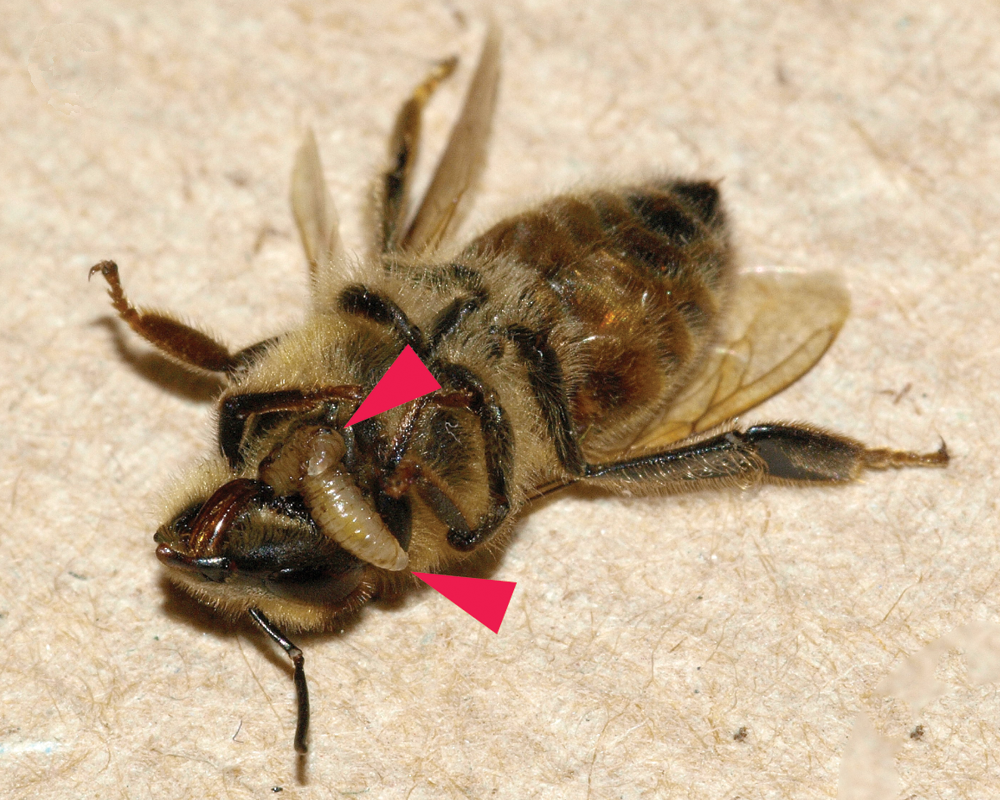
Two final-instar larvae of A. borealis exiting a honey bee worker at the junction of the head and thorax

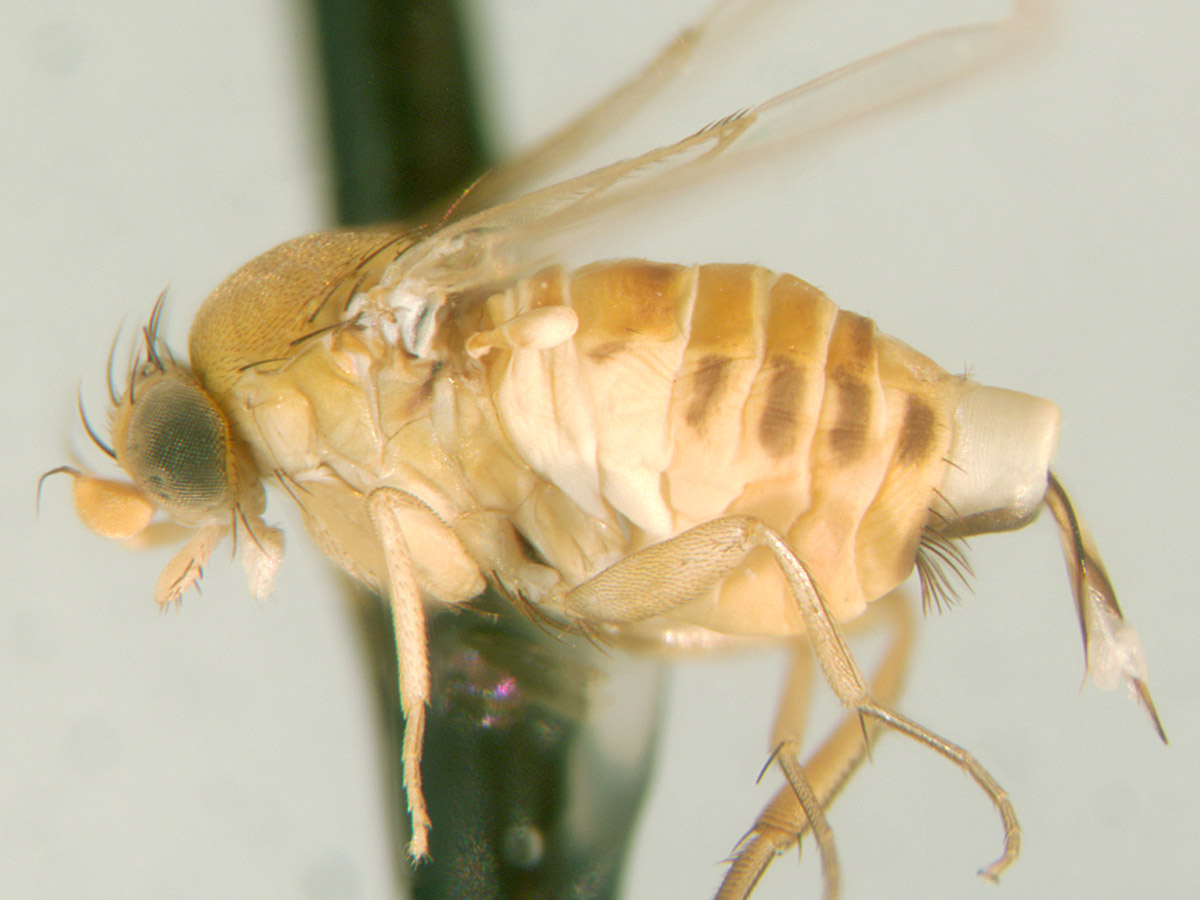
Adult female A. borealis

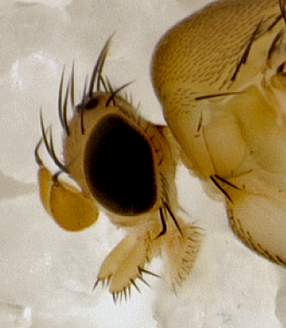
Head of an A. borealis

The initial description of the species by Charles Thomas Brues, 1924.

== Zombee Watch ==
A citizen science project, "Zombee Watch", uses a social media framework for people to report sightings of potentially parasitized bees. The stated goals of the project are to determine where in North America the zombie fly is parasitizing honey bees and how often honey bees leave their hives at night (even if they are not parasitized) and to engage citizen scientists in making a significant contribution to knowledge about honey bees and in becoming better observers of nature.
