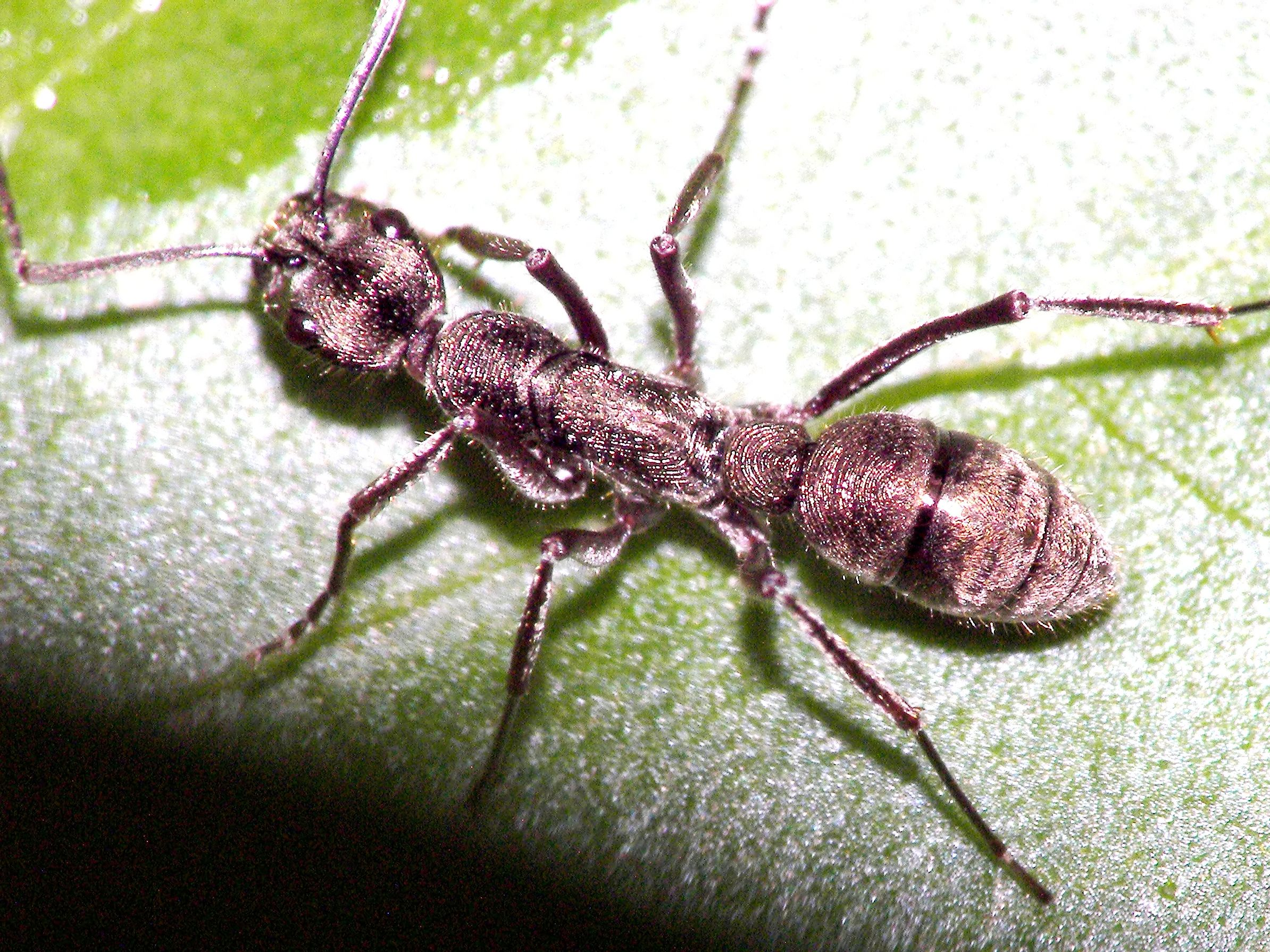

Scientific classification
- Kingdom: Animalia
- Phylum: Arthropoda
- Clade: Pancrustacea
- Class: Insecta
- Order: Hymenoptera
- Family: Formicidae
- Genus: Diacamma
- Species: D. rugosum

Binomial name
- Diacamma rugosum (Le Guillou, 1842)

Synonyms
- Diacamma bispinosum saussurei Forel, 1922; Diacamma japensis Donisthorpe, 1941; Diacamma rugosum geminatum Emery, 1897; Diacamma rugosum smithi Donisthorpe, 1943; Diacamma vagans frontalis Stitz, 1911; Diacamma vagans papuanum Stitz, 1911; Ponera geometrica Smith, F., 1857; Ponera sculpturata Smith, F., 1859; Ponera striata Smith, F., 1860; Ponera tortuolosa Smith, F., 1863; Ponera vagans Smith, F., 1860; Ponera versicolor Smith, F., 1857

= Diacamma rugosum =

Species of ant

Diacamma rugosum, also known as the Bornean queenless ant or Asian bullet ant, is a species of ant of the subfamily Ponerinae. It is found in many countries throughout Southeast Asia. 20 subspecies are recognized.

Diacamma rugosum is noted for being one of the only species of ants to completely lack a queen caste. Reproduction is done entirely by workers, with all workers being fertile upon birth. However, reproduction is kept strictly under control in the nest, with only one dominant female, or gamergate, laying all of the eggs. The gamergate will render workers sterile by mutilating their vestigial wing buds as soon as they pupate. These infertile workers, called callows, will remain loyal to the present gamergate and allow her to exercise control over the rest of the workers. This works to reduce colony infighting as it makes usurpation virtually impossible, and the only time the gamergate is replaced is if she dies naturally.

== Subspecies ==
- Diacamma rugosum anceps Matsumura & Uchida, 1926 - China
- Diacamma rugosum arcuatum Karavaiev, 1925 - Indonesia
- Diacamma rugosum balinense Karavaiev, 1925 - Indonesia
- Diacamma rugosum birmanum Emery, 1887 - Myanmar
- Diacamma rugosum celebense Emery, 1887 - Indonesia, Sulawesi
- Diacamma rugosum doveri Mukerjee, 1934 - India
- Diacamma rugosum gibbosum Karavaiev, 1935 - Vietnam
- Diacamma rugosum hortense Karavaiev, 1925 - Indonesia
- Diacamma rugosum javanum Emery, 1887 - Indonesia
- Diacamma rugosum jerdoni Forel, 1903 - India
- Diacamma rugosum latispinum Karavaiev, 1925 - Indonesia
- Diacamma rugosum lombokense Emery, 1897 - Indonesia
- Diacamma rugosum longiceps Santschi, 1932 - Vietnam
- Diacamma rugosum ovale Karavaiev, 1935 - Vietnam
- Diacamma rugosum rothneyi Forel, 1900 - India
- Diacamma rugosum rugosum (Le Guillou, 1842) - Borneo, Indonesia, New Guinea, Philippines, Singapore, Bangladesh, India, Sri Lanka, Thailand, Vietnam, China
- Diacamma rugosum sculptum Jerdon, 1851 - Bangladesh, India, Nepal
- Diacamma rugosum sikkimense Forel, 1903 - India
- Diacamma rugosum timorense Emery, 1887 - Indonesia, Timor
- Diacamma rugosum viridipurpureum Emery, 1893 - Philippine, India, China
