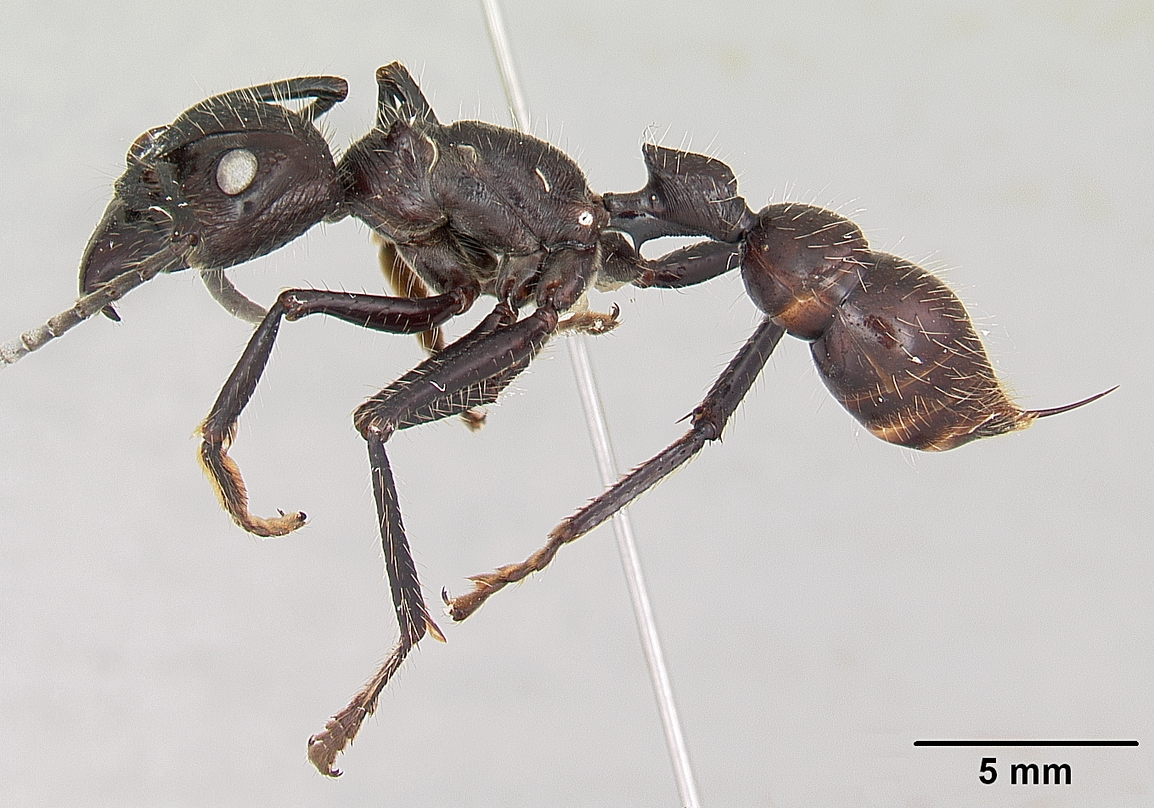
- P. clavata, or bullet ant, the sole extant member of the subfamily

Scientific classification
- Kingdom: Animalia
- Phylum: Arthropoda
- Class: Insecta
- Order: Hymenoptera
- Family: Formicidae
- Subfamily: Paraponerinae; Emery, 1901
- Tribe: Paraponerini; Emery, 1901
- Genus: Paraponera; F. Smith, 1858

Type species
- Formica clavata

Diversity
- 2 species

= Paraponera =

Genus of ants

Paraponera is a genus of ants and the only genus in the subfamily Paraponerinae. The name means "near-Ponera".

It consists of two species: the extant Paraponera clavata, also known as a bullet ant, found in the Neotropics, and the very small fossil species Paraponera dieteri known from Dominican amber (Early Miocene; 16-19 million years ago). Bullet ants are so named for the pain caused by their venomous stings. The intensely painful sting is toxic to invertebrates as well as vertebrates and a major component is the neurotoxic peptide poneratoxin.

== Species ==
- Paraponera clavata (Fabricius, 1775)
- †Paraponera dieteri Baroni Urbani, 1994
