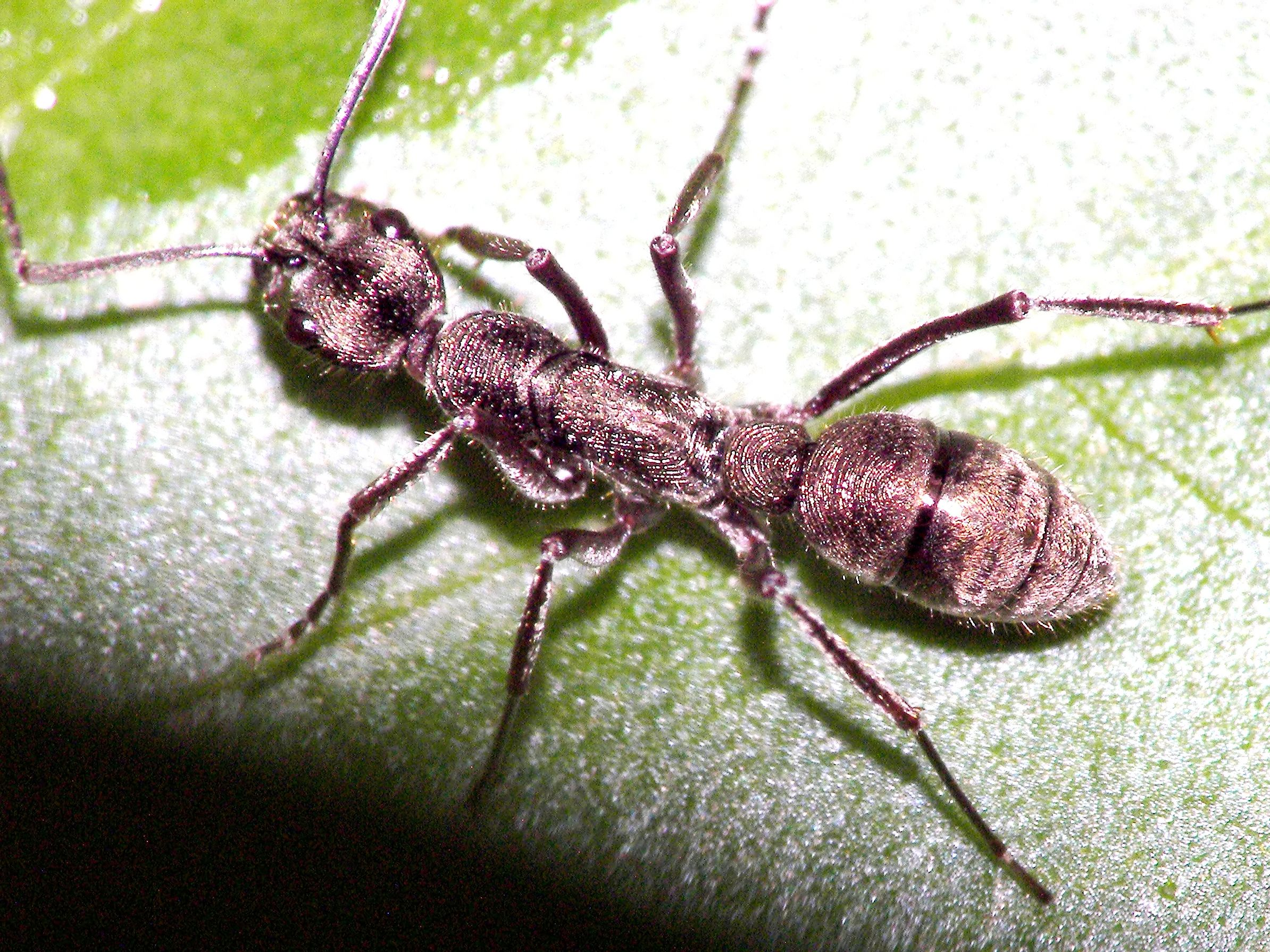
- Diacamma rugosum

Scientific classification
- Kingdom: Animalia
- Phylum: Arthropoda
- Class: Insecta
- Order: Hymenoptera
- Family: Formicidae
- Subfamily: Ponerinae
- Tribe: Ponerini
- Genus: Diacamma; Mayr, 1862

Type species
- Ponera rugosa Le Guillou, 1842

Diversity
- 24 species

= Diacamma =

Genus of ants

Diacamma is a genus of queenless ants belonging to the subfamily Ponerinae. It is distributed from India to Australia and contains about 24 species.

== Biology ==
A queen caste does not exist in Diacamma. Unique to this genus, all workers emerge from cocoons with a pair of tiny innervated thoracic appendages (gemmae) that are homologous with wings. Mutilation leads to a permanent change in lifetime trajectory, because workers lacking gemmae never mate. This is unlike other queenless ants where workers establish a dominance hierarchy to regulate reproduction. In Diacamma only one worker retains her gemmae in each colony, she is the gamergate (mated egglaying worker), and she bites off the gemmae of newly emerged workers. Mutilation causes the degeneration of the neuronal connections between the sensory hairs on the gemma's surface and the central nervous system, and this may explain the irreversibility of modifications in individual behaviour.

== Species ==
- Diacamma assamense Emery, 1897
- Diacamma australe (Fabricius, 1775)
- Diacamma baguiense Wheeler & Chapman, 1925
- Diacamma bispinosum (Le Guillou, 1842)
- Diacamma ceylonense Emery, 1897
- Diacamma colosseense Forel, 1915
- Diacamma cupreum (Smith, 1860)
- Diacamma cyaneiventre André, 1887
- Diacamma holosericeum (Roger, 1860)
- Diacamma indicum Santschi, 1920
- Diacamma intricatum (Smith, 1857)
- Diacamma jacobsoni Forel, 1912
- Diacamma leve Crawley, 1915
- Diacamma longitudinale Emery, 1889
- Diacamma palawanicum Emery, 1900
- Diacamma pallidum (Smith, 1858)
- Diacamma panayense Wheeler & Chapman, 1925
- Diacamma purpureum (Smith, 1863)
- Diacamma rugivertex Emery, 1902
- Diacamma rugosum (Le Guillou, 1842)
- Diacamma scalpratum (Smith, 1858)
- Diacamma schoedli Shattuck & Barnett, 2006
- Diacamma sericeiventre Stitz, 1925
- Diacamma solitaria (Smith, 1860)
- Diacamma unicolor (Smith, 1860)
