= Poneratoxin =

Paralyzing neurotoxic peptide

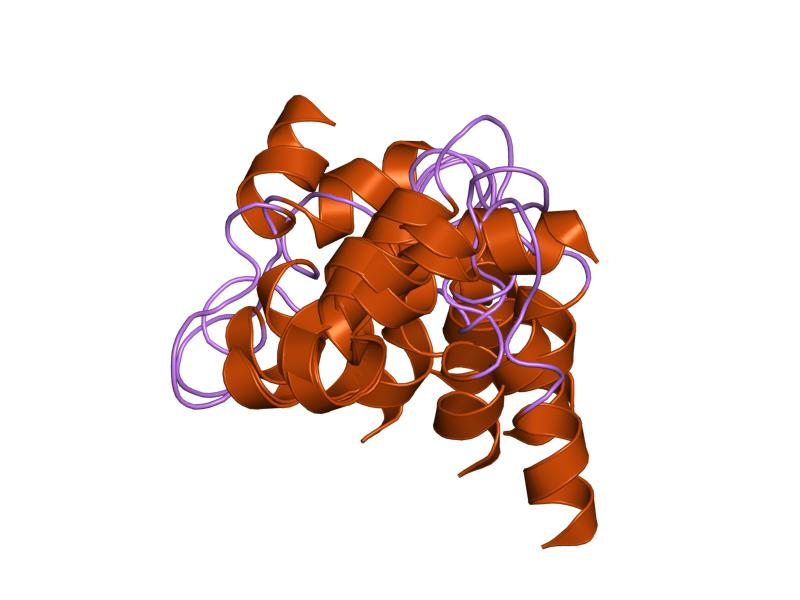

Identifiers
- Symbol: Poneratoxin
- SCOP2: 1G92 / SCOPe / SUPFAM
- OPM superfamily: 151
- OPM protein: 1g92

Poneratoxin is a paralyzing neurotoxic peptide made by the bullet ant Paraponera clavata. It prevents inactivation of voltage gated sodium channels and therefore blocks synaptic transmission in the central nervous system. Specifically, poneratoxin acts on voltage gated sodium channels in skeletal muscle fibers, causing paralysis, and nociceptive fibers, causing pain. It is rated as a 4 plus on the Schmidt sting pain index, the highest possible rating with that system, and its effects can cause waves of pain up to twelve hours after a single sting. It is additionally being studied for its uses in biological insecticides.

== Mechanism of action ==
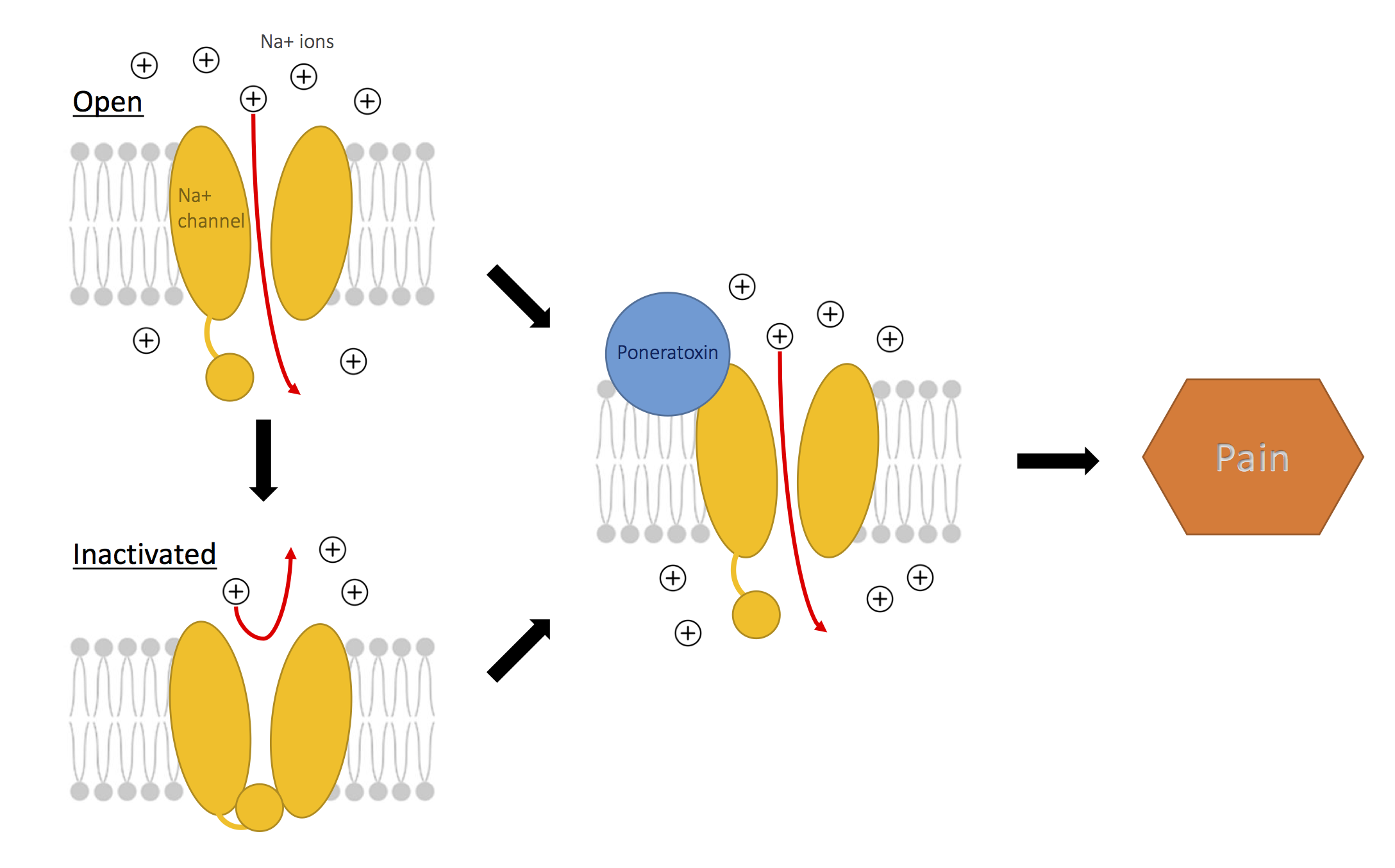
Schematic shows normal open and inactivated voltage-gated sodium channels on the left. Upon binding of poneratoxin, the sodium channel is forced to stay in the open state, unable to be inactivated. This leads to prolongation of action potentials, which is associated with the pain from bullet ant stings.

Overall, poneratoxin disrupts normal function of voltage-gated sodium channels in both vertebrates and invertebrates. It causes repetitive firing and prolongation of action potentials, particularly in the central nervous system of insects. The increase in signaling is what causes the intense pain from bullet ant stings.

Poneratoxin is in an inactive state when stored in the ant venom reservoir due to the reservoir's acidic conditions, but it becomes toxic when activated via a multistep process. The combination of poneratoxin binding to a cell membrane (in order to act upon a voltage-gated sodium channel) and the movement from acidic conditions in the ant venom reservoir to basic conditions at the target site leads to poneratoxin undergoing a conformational change that activates it.

Catterall et al. hypothesized that some polypeptide neurotoxins modify voltage-gated channels function via a "voltage-sensor trapping" mechanism. The hypothesis states that neurotoxins similar to poneratoxin, such as alpha-scorpion toxins, act upon sodium channels via binding to the channels' receptor site 3, which normally affects the channels' ability to inactivate. Therefore, receptor site 3 neurotoxins often affect sodium channels by slowing or blocking inactivation. Normally, the region of the channel where neurotoxin receptor site 3 is undergoes a conformational change of an outward movement to lead to inactivation. Receptor site 3 neurotoxins are proposed to prevent this conformational change via interaction with acidic and hydrophobic amino acid residues at that site.

When frog skeletal muscle fibers were exposed to poneratoxin, it was found that poneratoxin primarily affected voltage-dependent sodium channels by decreasing the peak sodium current and also inducing a slow sodium current. This combination resulted in the sodium channels activating at very negative potentials and deactivating very slowly, a phenomenon commonly seen in excitable tissues. Poneratoxin is considered as a slow-acting agonist for smooth muscles.

== Structure ==
The poneratoxin peptide is stored in an inactive 25-residue peptide (amino acid sequence FLPLLILGSLLMTPPVIQAIHDAQR) in the venom reservoir of Paraponera clavata. The secondary structure is characterized by a helix-turn-helix motif: two alpha helices connected by a beta-turn.

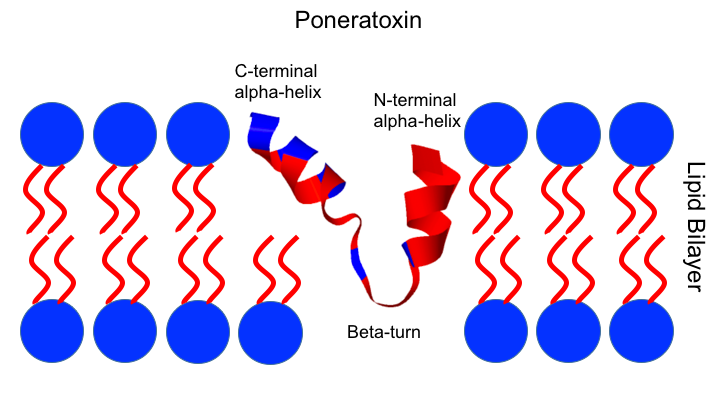
Poneratoxin inserting into the plasma membrane. Blue regions are hydrophilic, and red regions are hydrophobic

The two alpha helices are formed by residues 3–9 at the N-terminus, and residues 17–24 at the C-terminus, and they are connected by the beta-turn at residues 11–16. From a three-dimensional perspective, this structure forms a preferential V-shape with the two helices undergoing loose non-covalent interactions with each other. This is notable because of its structural similarity to other peptides that interact with the membrane, and indicates that poneratoxin will also interact with the membrane and thereby affect embedded voltage gated sodium channels. Furthermore, the structure of the peptide shifts from a random coil to the structured helix-turn-helix when introduced to a lipid bilayer environment, which indicates that this motif is important for interacting with the membrane.

The two alpha helices, however, have markedly different characteristics. The N-terminal alpha helix is apolar, containing a central hydrophobic core with hydrophilic residues at either end, and is uncharged. It is similar in structure to a transmembrane signal peptide, which implies that it will anchor at the membrane by burying the hydrophobic core within the bilayer. In particular, the bulky and very hydrophobic phenylalanine residue is important for interacting with uncharged lipid bilayers, such as those composed of phosphatidylcholine. The C-terminal alpha helix is amphipathic with one side displaying polar and charged residues, and the other displaying non-polar residues, which drives insertion into the plasma membrane. Specifically, the positively charged arginine and the non-polar alanine residues were both shown to be essential for poneratoxin potency. See figure, where the hydrophobic (red) and hydrophilic (blue) regions of poneratoxin and the lipid bilayer align, demonstrating that the structure is evolved to insert into the membrane, which will promote interaction with the voltage gated sodium channels.

== Toxicology ==
Many people consider a sting from a bullet ant to resemble the sensation of getting shot. Justin Schmidt, an entomologist who developed the Schmidt sting pain index, described it as "pure, intense, brilliant pain...like walking over flaming charcoal with a three-inch nail embedded in your heel," and considered the sting from a bullet ant to be the most painful insect sting he experienced. The pain from bullet ant stings can last for many hours, even up to 24 hours. Both the immense pain and the duration of the sting are due to the effects of poneratoxin. In addition to the notorious pain, symptoms of stings from bullet ants (as well as stings from other ants of the genus Paraponera as well as the genus Dinoponera) include fever, cold sweats, nausea, vomiting, lymphadenopathy and cardiac arrhythmias.

Toxicity assays have found that the LT_{50} of poneratoxin, delivered via injections of genetically engineered viruses, to S. frugiperda larvae, was at 131 hours post-injection. A dose of 10^{5} pfu of recombinant baculovirus encoding poneratoxin was sufficient to kill the S. frugiperda larvae, and an injected dose of 10 ng poneratoxin could paralyze them. Based on these experiments, scientists believe poneratoxin can make a good candidate as a bio-insecticide because of its neurotoxicity to other insects, making it capable of immobilizing or even killing insects infected with it.

== See also ==
- Ant venom
- Toxin
