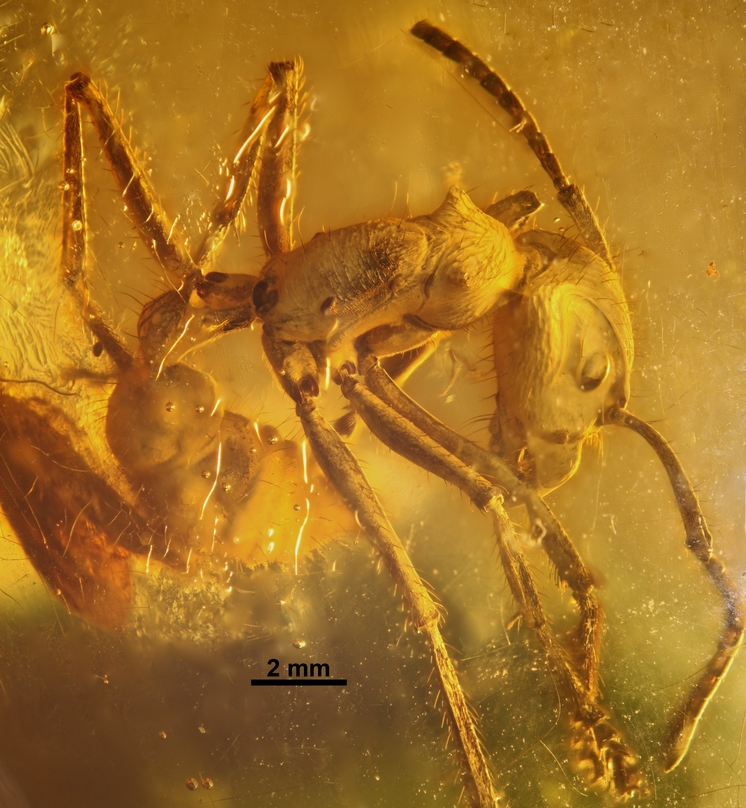

Scientific classification
- Kingdom: Animalia
- Phylum: Arthropoda
- Clade: Pancrustacea
- Class: Insecta
- Order: Hymenoptera
- Family: Formicidae
- Genus: Paraponera
- Species: †P. dieteri

Binomial name
- †Paraponera dieteri Baroni Urbani, 1994

= Paraponera dieteri =

Paraponera dieteri Temporal range: Early Miocene Dominican amber

Extinct species of ant

Paraponera dieteri is an extinct species of Miocene ant in the genus Paraponera. The fossils of the species were found in the Dominican amber and were described by Baroni Urbani in 1994. The fossils are now in the collection of the State Museum of Natural History Stuttgart.

That it was found in Dominican Republic suggests that this species belonged to the tropical area.

== Etymology ==
The species is named after Dieter Schlee who was responsible for the buildup of Dominican amber collection at the Stuttgart Museum.
