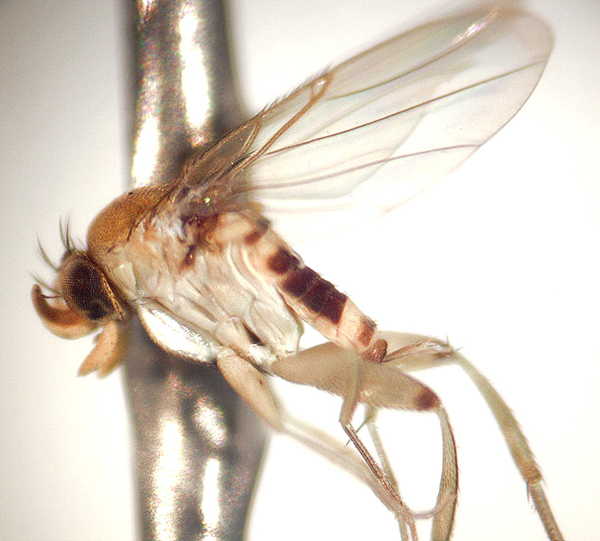
- Apocephalus longistylus

Scientific classification
- Domain: Eukaryota
- Kingdom: Animalia
- Phylum: Arthropoda
- Class: Insecta
- Order: Diptera
- Family: Phoridae
- Tribe: Metopinini
- Genus: Apocephalus; Coquillett, 1901

Type species
- Apocephalus pergandei Coquillett, 1901

Diversity
- at least 300 species

Synonyms
- Mesophora Borgmeier, 1937; Pseudoplastophora Schmitz, 1915; Zyziphora Peterson & Robinson, 1976

= Apocephalus =

Genus of flies

Apocephalus is a genus of ant-decapitating flies (insects in the family Phoridae). There are at least 300 described species in Apocephalus.

== See also ==
- List of Apocephalus species
