= Pseudacteon formicarum =

Scientific classification
- Kingdom: Animalia
- Phylum: Arthropoda
- Class: Insecta
- Order: Diptera
- Family: Phoridae
- Genus: Pseudacteon
- Species: P. formicarum

Binomial name
- Pseudacteon formicarum (Verrall, 1877)

Species of fly

Pseudacteon formicarum is a kind of parasitic species of flies from the family of Phoridae of the subfamily Metopininae.

== Distribution and ecology ==
Pseudacteon formicarum is found in Europe, and is parasitic on the ants Lasius alienus, Lasius niger, Lasius emarginatus, Lasius flavus, Lasius fuliginosus, Formica sanguinea, Myrmica lobicornis, Tapinoma erraticum and others.
