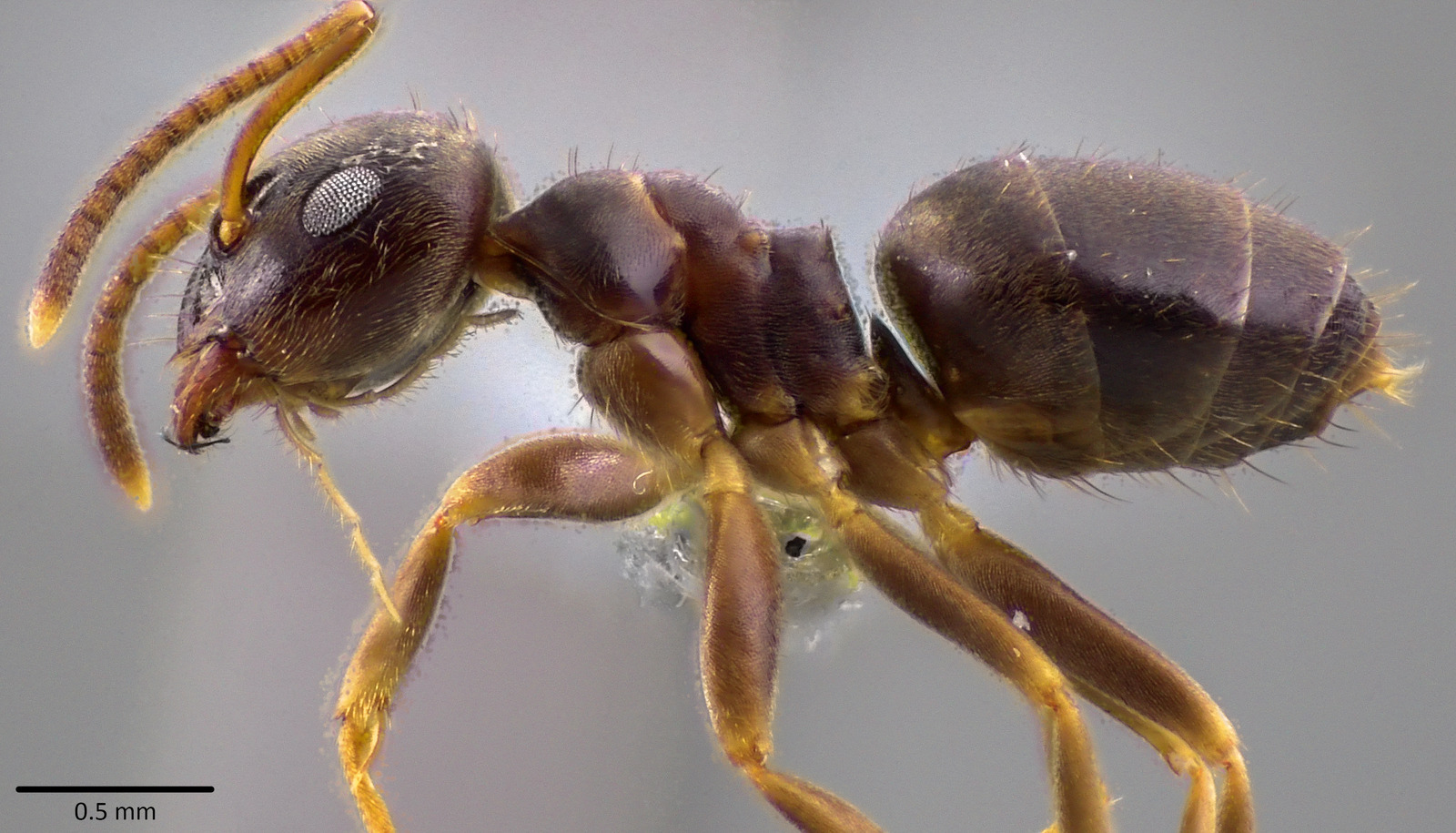

Scientific classification
- Domain: Eukaryota
- Kingdom: Animalia
- Phylum: Arthropoda
- Class: Insecta
- Order: Hymenoptera
- Family: Formicidae
- Subfamily: Formicinae
- Genus: Lasius
- Subgenus: Lasius
- Species: L. americanus

Binomial name
- Lasius americanus Emery, 1893

= Lasius americanus =

Species of insects

Lasius americanus, or woodland fuzzy ant, is a species of ant in the subfamily Formicinae.

== Description ==
Lasius americanus workers are often a shade of dusty brown that have lighter semi-translucent legs. Antennae do not have any erect setae (stiff hair like structures), and propodeum and back legs typically have very few near their base.

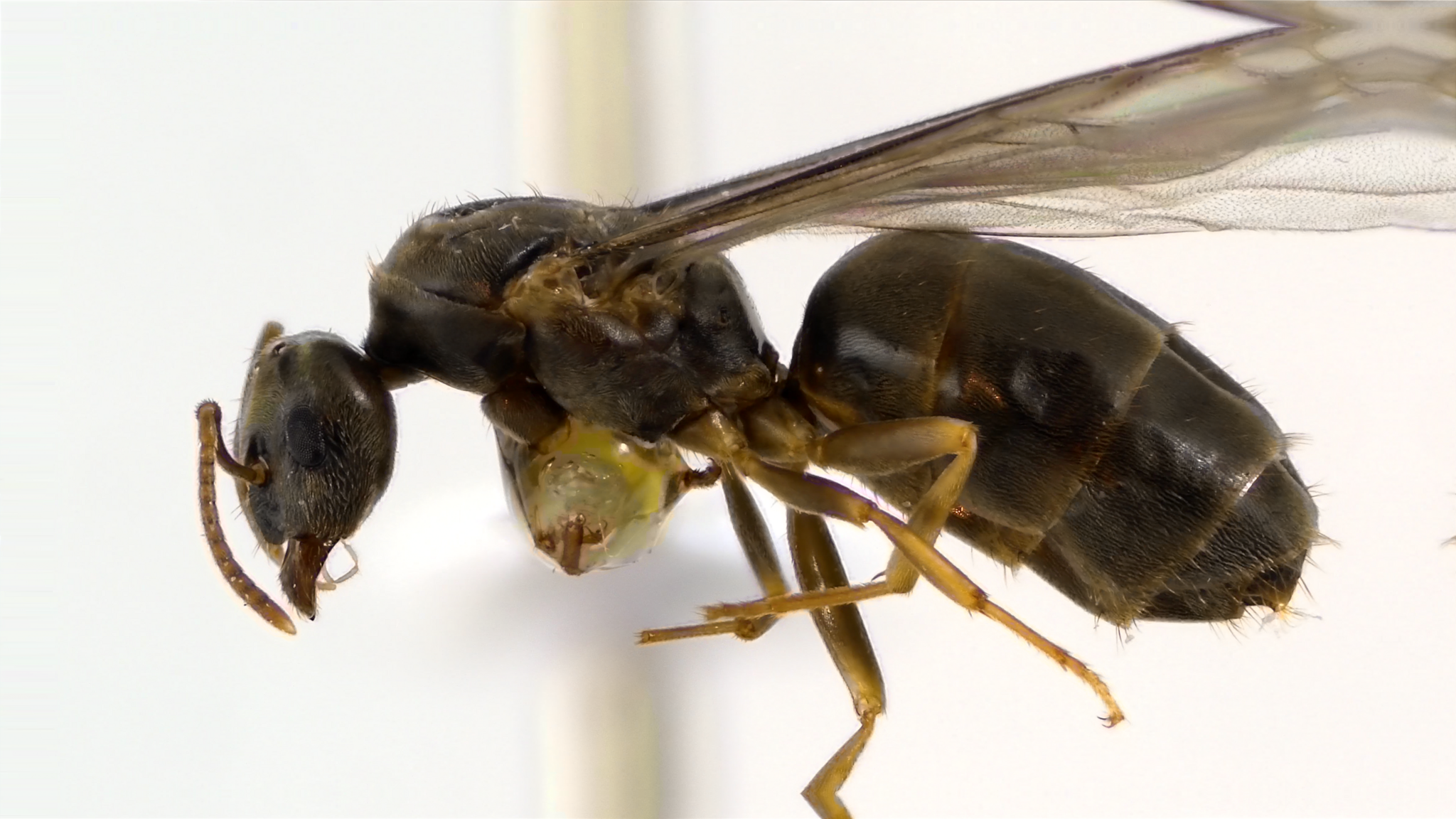
Queen

== Habitat and distribution ==
Woodland fuzzy ants are typically found in North America, most predominantly in southern Canada and the eastern United States. They are most commonly found in temperate forests and woodlands, usually under rotting wood or in trees.

== Entymology ==
Lasius americanus used to be referred to as Lasius alienus but has been labeled as its own species since 2018 and was included in Lasius niger before that.
