= Streptomyces lasiicapitis =

Scientific classification
- Domain: Bacteria
- Kingdom: Bacillati
- Phylum: Actinomycetota
- Class: Actinomycetia
- Order: Streptomycetales
- Family: Streptomycetaceae
- Genus: Streptomyces
- Species: S. lasiicapitis

Binomial name
- Streptomyces lasiicapitis Ye et al. 2017

Type strain
- CGMCC 4.7349, DSM 103124, 3H-HV17(2)

Species of bacterium

Streptomyces lasiicapitis is a bacterium species from the genus of Streptomyces which has been isolated from the head of the ant Lasius fuliginosus. Streptomyces lasiicapitis produces the antibiotic kanchanamycin.

== See also ==
- List of Streptomyces species
