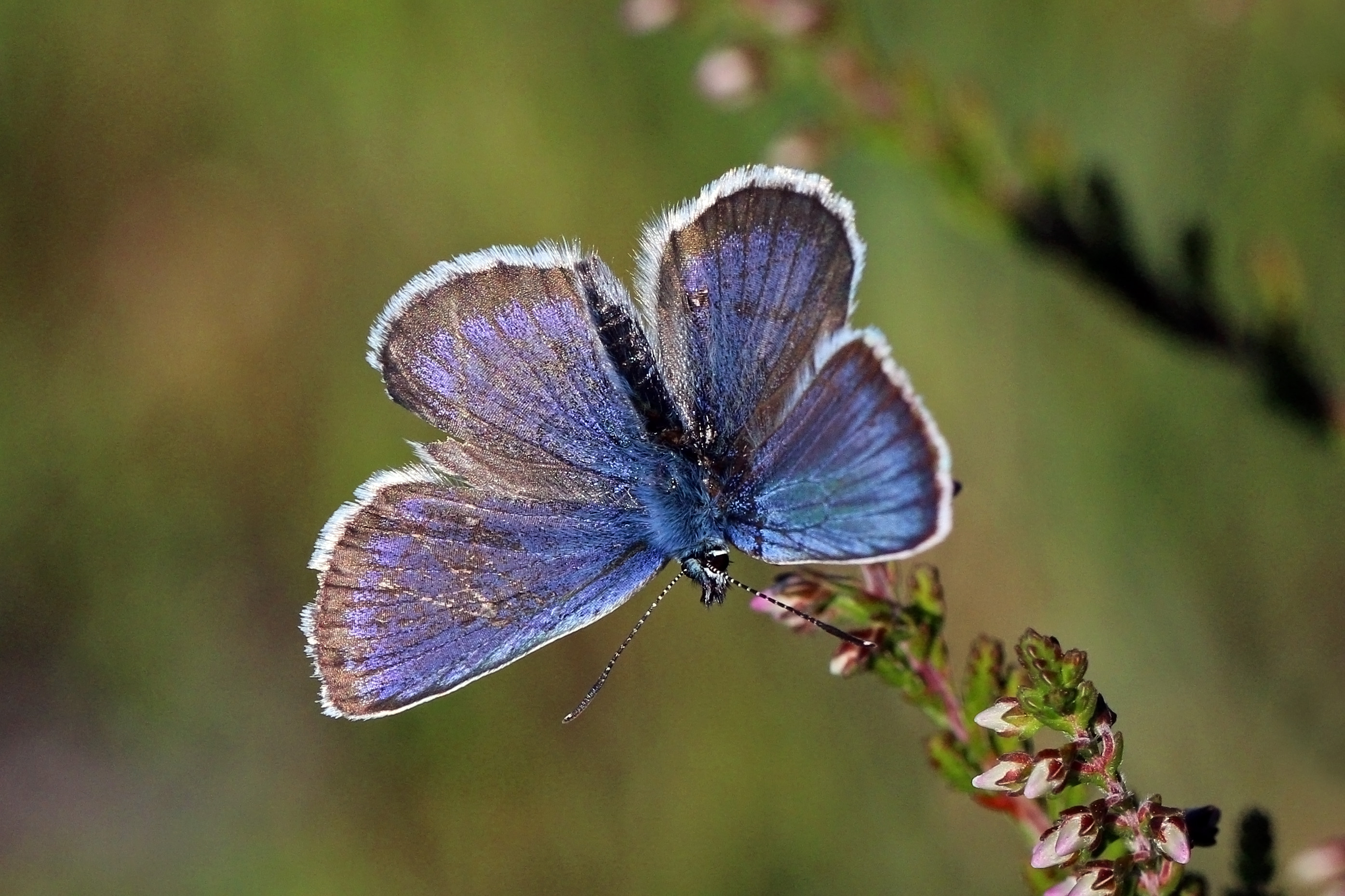
- Male, Hampshire, England
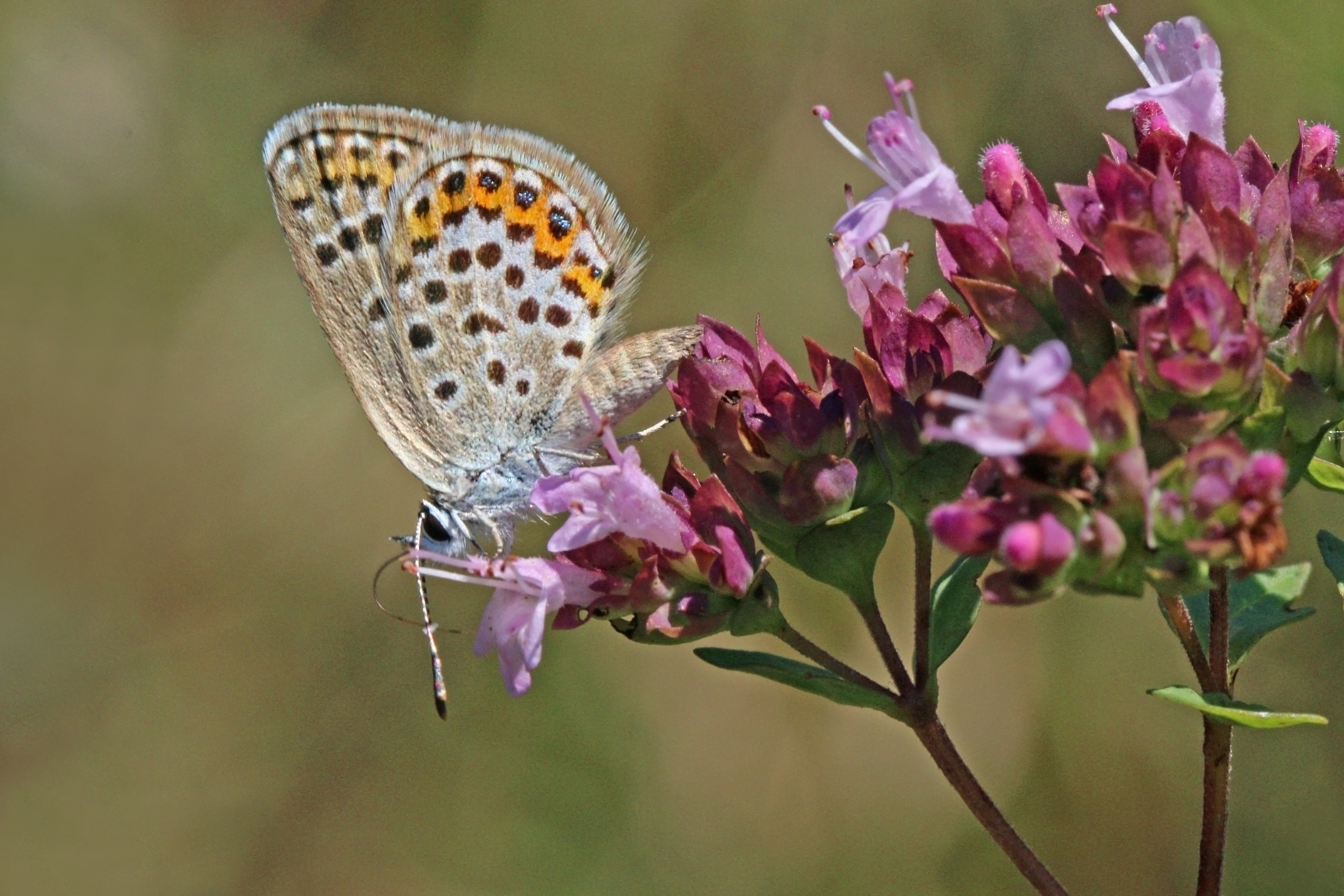
- Female, Bulgaria

Scientific classification
- Kingdom: Animalia
- Phylum: Arthropoda
- Clade: Pancrustacea
- Class: Insecta
- Order: Lepidoptera
- Family: Lycaenidae
- Genus: Plebejus
- Species: P. argus

Binomial name
- Plebejus argus (Linnaeus, 1758)

Synonyms
- Lycaena argus

= Silver-studded blue =

Species of butterfly

The silver-studded blue (Plebejus argus) is a butterfly in the family Lycaenidae. It has bright blue wings rimmed in black with white edges and silver spots on its hindwings, lending it its name. P. argus can be found across Europe and east across the Palearctic, but it is most often studied in the United Kingdom where the species has experienced a severe decline in population due to habitat loss and fragmentation.

P. argus engages in mutualism with ants that contribute to the butterflies' reproductive fitness by providing protection from predation and parasitism from the point of egg laying to their emergence as adults. P. argus adults emerge at the end of June and beginning of July and engage in flight until the beginning of August.

The butterfly is adaptable to different habitats and is found in heathland, mossland, and calcareous grassland. Tending towards a sedentary lifestyle and typically flying less than 20 metres (66 ft) a day, P. argus maintains a small radius home range. Their habitats lend themselves well to both foraging and egg laying as the host plants are ubiquitous in all three environments they occupy.

== Appearance ==
=== Adult ===
Male P. argus have royal blue wings with a black border, white, wispy fringe, and metallic silver spots on the hindwings as well as spurs on their front legs. Females of this species are generally brown and more subdued in color, but also have the metallic spots on the hindwings. The undersides of the male and female butterflies are very similar. They are taupe in color, with rings of black spots along the edge of the wing.

== Description ==
The adult is much like Reverdin's blue, Plebejus argyrognomon, with a deep dark blue upper side and a broad black border. There are glittering scales on the underside of the hindwing. It differs from P. argyrognomon in several details that vary between individuals. On the upperside the blue gloss is deeper, darker, duller, with a slight violet tint and not so far extended to the margin. The margin is broader and looks blacker; the row of dark submarginal dots sometimes seen on the upperside of the hindwing is always in the black border in P. argus. On the underside, both sexes of P. argus nearly always have a strongly glittering blue-green dusting at the base of the wings, usually but not always absent from P. argyrognomon. P. argus is usually smaller than argyrognomon.

The caterpillar larva is very variable, usually light green with dark dorsal spots, sometimes grey or dark brown with pale spots. In early summer and autumn the larva feeds on plants such as Coronilla, Trifolium, Colutea, and Genista. The larva and pupa are associated with the ant Formica cinerea and live in its nests. The pupa is elongate, green with red dorsal line; abdomen above yellowish green. There are two broods in the south, with adults on the wing in May and again from July onwards, but there is only one brood in the north. They favour sandy soil, like the ant.

=== Larvae ===
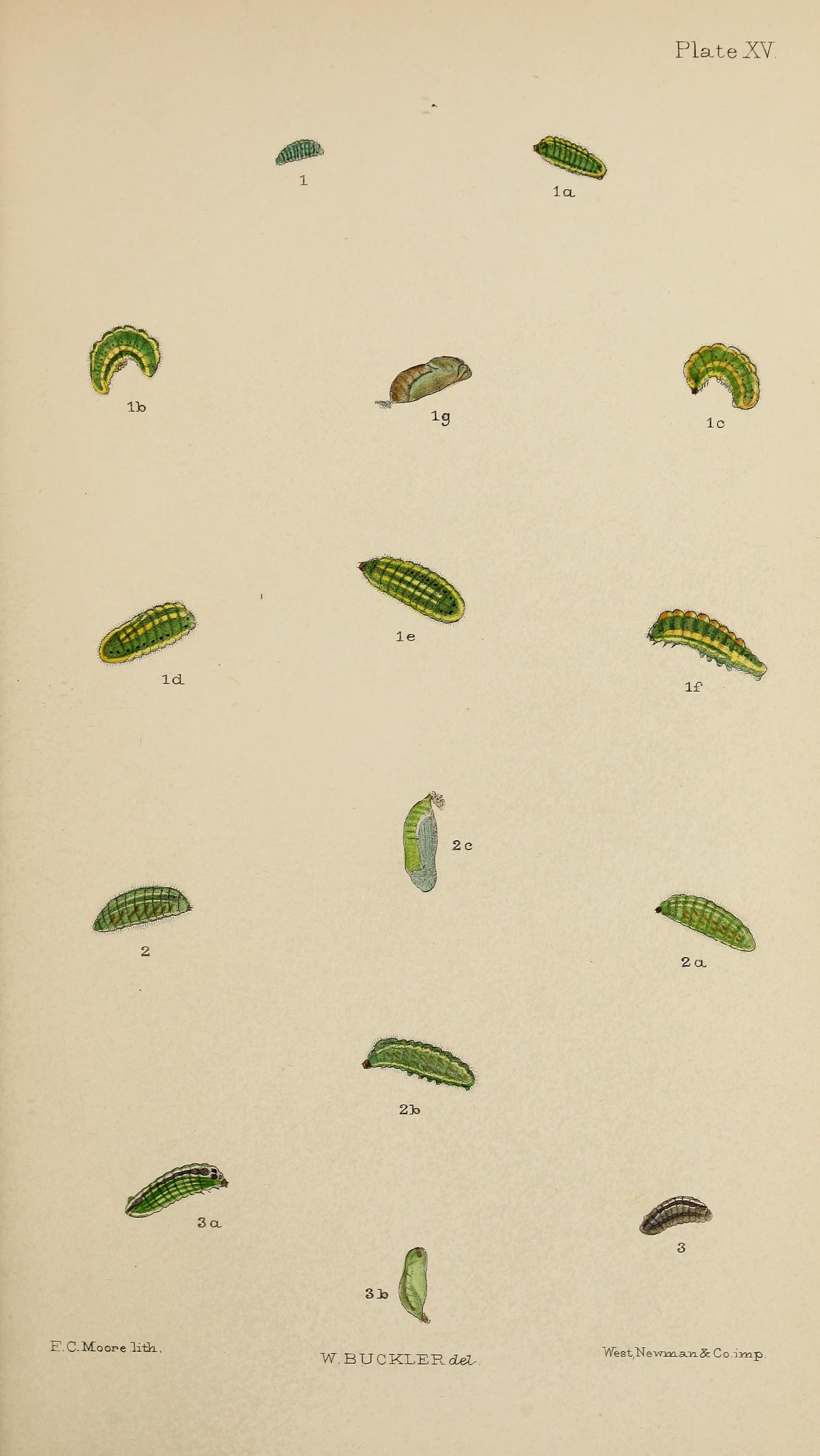
Figs 3 larva before last moult, 3a larva after last moult, 3b pupa

The caterpillar of P. argus is green with a dark stripe along the length of its body and can reach 1.3 centimeters in length.

=== Sexual dimorphism ===
P. argus is sexually dimorphic, as evidenced by the color of their wings. This acts as an important visual cue when searching for suitable mates. Species that have overlapping habitat distribution and are of similar color (according to the human eye) have distinct absorbance values within the UV range; the UV range colors are important for butterflies when recognizing members of their own species.

== Geographic range ==
P. argus is found across the Palearctic. In the United Kingdom, the butterfly experienced a severe decline in population during the nineteenth and twentieth centuries. P. argus is generally considered to be endangered and extinct in the Northern United Kingdom and are primarily found in the Southern and Western portions of the United Kingdom.

== Habitat ==
P. argus resides in heathland, mossland, and limestone grassland.

Heathlands are able to meet the needs of P. argus due to burning, cutting, and other disruptions of mature heaths. With these disruptions, the habitat becomes conducive to habitation by P. argus because of the high cover of E. cinerea and short C. vulgaris that is able to form a landscape with the patches of bare ground. This is characteristic of heathland at an early stage of development. This environment is suitable until the point at which the shrubs native to the environment mature and obscure the bare ground and vegetation margins that the butterflies use for oviposition.

Mossland, similar in nature to wet heathland, has soil primarily composed of peat which supports one of the families of host plants of P. argus, Ericaceae. This host plant grows alongside other grasses, sedges, and rushes. While the main disturbance to heathland is quarrying, mossland faces peat digging which contributes to the transient and shifting nature of this particular habitat.

The hostplants of the first two environments, Ericaceae and Leguminosae, are less present in the third environment, limestone grassland. In this environment, the host plants of P. argus are primarily herbaceous Cistaceae as well as Leguminosae. In limestone grassland, the bare ground and vegetation margins instrumental to the life cycle of P. argus are created through grazing by other animals as well as by disruption of the habitat by natural disturbance of the stoney topography of this environment.

P. argus use shrubs for roosting, resting, basking, mate location, and shelter and for this reason, they tend to be found in higher numbers close to locations that are dense in shrubs. Most of the population gathers around these shrubs during weather that is colder, cloudy, and windier. When the weather is warm, sunny, and the breeze is still, P. argus spends less time in shrub dense habitats and more time in flight and finding host plants in areas rich in calcareous heath. These areas tend to be on exposed hillsides. For this reason, it often appears that the habitat of P. argus shifts with weather conditions.

In addition to choice of habitat due to host plants and topography, P. argus density correlates with the densities of nest of the butterflies' mutualist ants, Lasius niger and Lasius alienus.

== Home range and territoriality ==
Adult P. argus tend to be very sedentary, only moving around 20 metres (66 ft) every day. For this reason, the butterflies colonize on discrete territory and patches of land. Some butterflies, though, disperse and move over a kilometer between colonies. This is rare, however, as these butterflies tend to form metapopulations.

== Food resources ==
=== Caterpillars and larvae ===
Different types of P. argus larvae choose different host plants. The limestone larvae, caernensis, preferentially select Helianthemum species over heathers as a host plant, while heathland larvae select heathers over Helianthemum.

=== Adult diet ===
Adults feed on nectar.

== Parental care ==
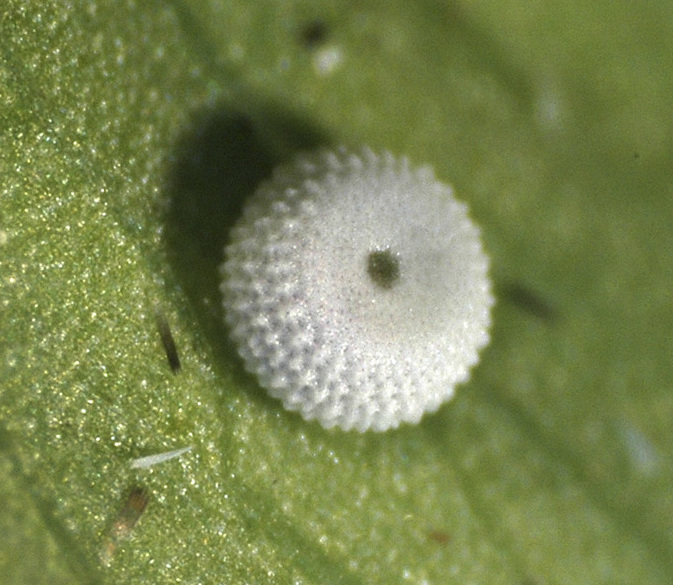
Egg

=== Oviposition ===
P. argus lays its eggs differently based on its environment. In heathland, they lay their eggs at the base of Erica tetralix, Calluna vulgaris, Erica cinerea, and Ulex europaeus. In mosslands, the butterflies tend to lay their eggs on the underside of the fronds of the Bracken Fern. This fern appears to be preferential for oviposition because they attract ants. In limestone grasslands, P. argus lays eggs at the stem of Lotus corniculatus and at the base of Helianthemum chamaecistus.

=== Egg guarding ===
Egg guarding primarily occurs through mutualism with the ants Lasius niger and Lasius alienus. Mothers lay their eggs in locations with strong pheromonal traces from these organisms. From the time of oviposition to hatching, L. niger and L. alienus protect the eggs from predation and parasitism by other organisms. In return, the ants feed on a saccharine secretion produced by glands on the larvae.

== Life history ==
=== Life cycle ===
The life cycles of Plebejus argus are divided into four main stages: eggs, larvae, pupa, and adults.

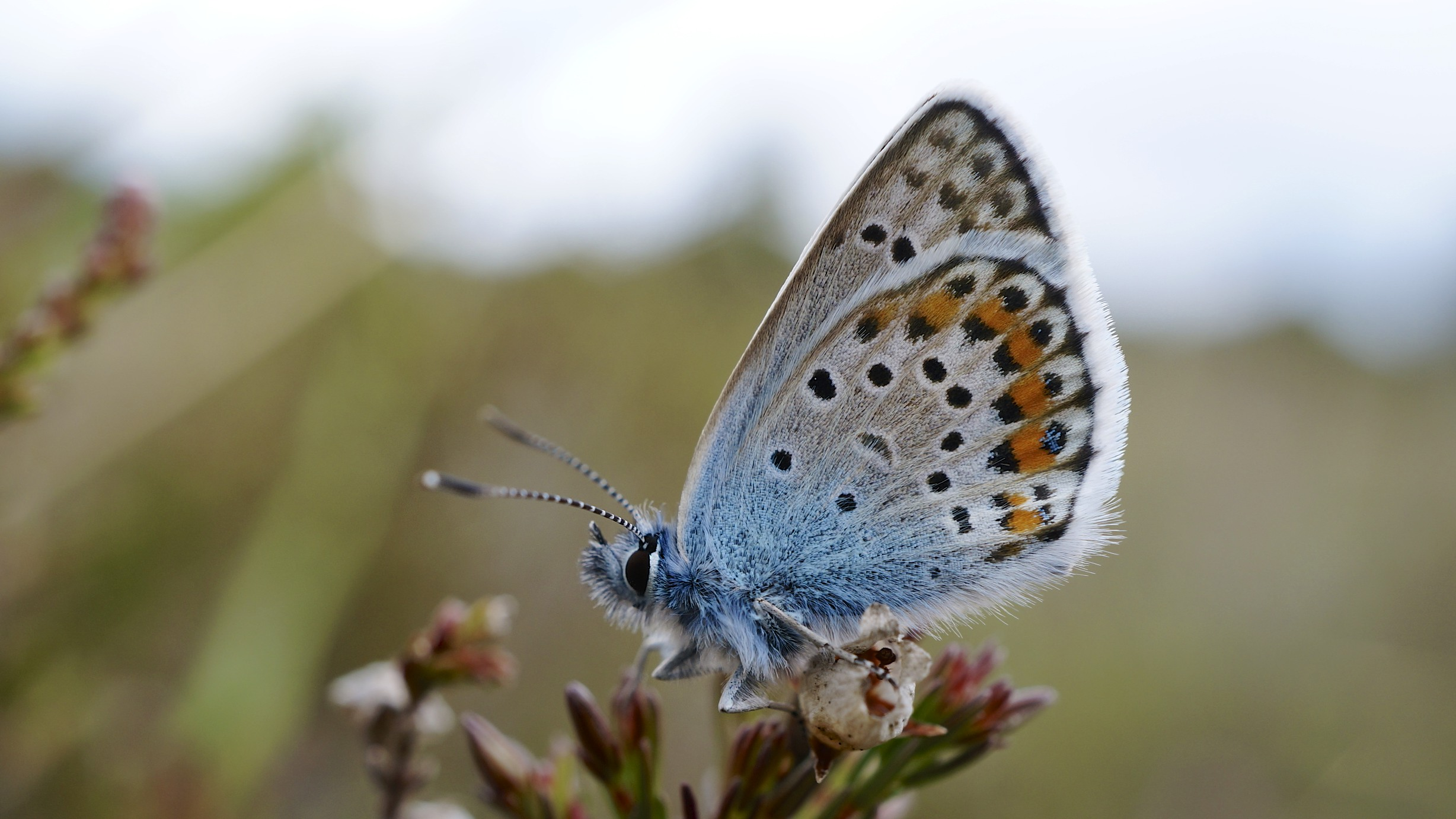
Adult

==== Larva ====
Larvae usually spend the day in the nests of the ants. This helps them avoid predation and high temperatures, especially in the hot summer months. They come out at night and climb the host plant in order to feed.

==== Adult ====
P. argus adults emerge in the end of June and beginning of July and engage in flight into the beginning of August. In these butterflies, there is a sex difference in emergence, with males emerging four to nine days earlier than females. As colony size increases, P. argus are temporally recorded earlier in the year. Additionally, as colony size increases, female emergence happens over a greater range of time and there is a greater discrepancy between emergence of the males and emergence of the females.

The adult butterfly lives only for about 4-5 days, and just a few weeks of rain during the mating season could wipe out entire colonies.

== Subspecies ==
- P. a. argus Scandinavia
- P. a. aegon (Denis & Schiffermüller, 1775) Karelia
- P. a. cleomenes (Fruhstorfer, 1910) Carpathians
- P. a. wolgensis (Forster, 1936) southern Europe, Kazakhstan, Tian-Shan, Tarbagatai, Saur, southern Altai
- P. a. bellus (Herrich-Schäffer, 1844) Asia Minor, Kurdistan, Levant, Caucasus, Armenia, Talysh
- P. a. obensis (Forster, 1936) Ural, western Siberia
- P. a. clarasiaticus (Verity, 1931) eastern Altai, Sayan, Transbbaikalia, western Amur
- P. a. pamirus (Forster, 1936) Pamirs-Alai, Tian-Shan
- P. a. coreanus Tutt, 1909 eastern Amur, Ussuri, Korea
- P. a. micrargus (Butler, 1878) Japan, Sakhalin
- P. a. asur Agenjo, 1966 Villasur, Spain
- P. a. bejarensis (Chapman, 1902) Castilla-Leon, Béjar, Spain
- P. a. branuelasensis (Tutt, 1909) Branuelas, Spain
- P. a. casaiacus Chapman, 1907 Casayo, north-western Spain
- P. a. claraobscura (Verity, 1931) Larche, Basses-Alpes, 1700-2000m, France
- P. a. seoki Shirozu & Sibitani, 1943 Saishuto, Korea
- P. a. vigensis Tutt, 1909 Vigo, north-western Spain
- P. a. sultana (Forster, 1936) Asia Minor

== Mating ==
When a male detects a female sitting quiescently, he flies towards the female. As he approaches the female, he flutters his wings in broad sweeping movements and she raises her abdomen while vibrating her half-open wings in a mate refusal posture. The female then flies away and is followed by the male. Once she lands, the male flutters around, either in the air before descending or after landing. The female displays a receptive posture by folding her wings after which the male positions himself parallel to the female before bending his abdomen, spreading the valves, and exposing the copulatory apparatus. He proceeds to attach to the copulatory apparatus and the butterflies reorient themselves into the copulatory position. The intermediate aspects of sexual chase depend on the sexual receptiveness of the female to the advances of the male.

== Mutualism ==
P. argus lays eggs near nests of Lasius niger, the ant with which they form a mutualistic relationship. This mutualistic relationship benefits the adult butterfly by reducing the need for parental investment. Once the eggs hatch, the ants chaperone the larvae, averting the attacks of predatory organisms like wasps and spiders as well as parasites. In return, the ants receive a saccharine secretion fortified with amino acids from an eversible gland on the larvae's back. As first instar larvae prepare to pupate, the ants carry the larvae into their nests. Once the larvae become pupae, the ants continue to provide protection against predation and parasitism. The butterfly leaves the nest when it emerges in June.

== Conservation ==
=== Habitat loss ===
P. argus has undergone habitat loss and fragmentation in the United Kingdom due to the development of industrial agriculture, new forestry practices, and landscape development. Additionally, the percentage of heathland has decreased by over fifty percent in the United Kingdom, greatly affecting the butterflies for which this was a primary habitat. The heathland that remained was reduced in quality due to shifting environmental influences. Rabbits helped keep vegetation short through grazing which was conducive to habitation by P. argus, but in the middle of the twentieth century, a virus, Myxomatosis, caused a significant decline in the population of rabbits and therefore the grass length grew to a point that was no longer conducive to the butterflies.

== Gallery ==
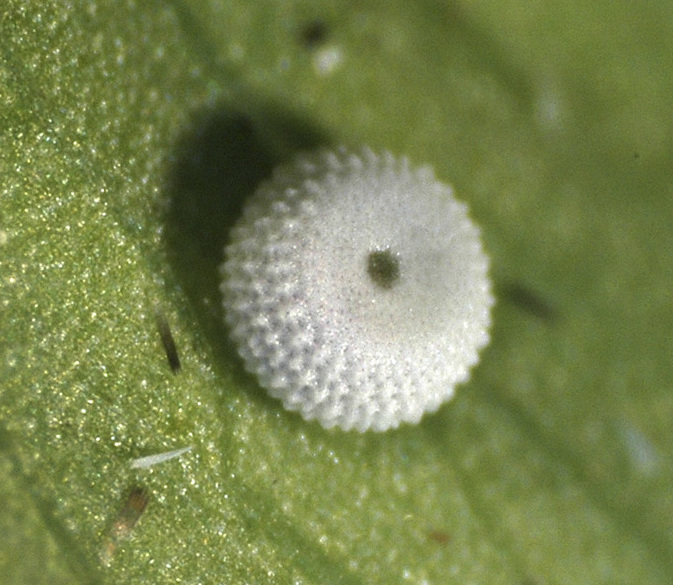
Egg

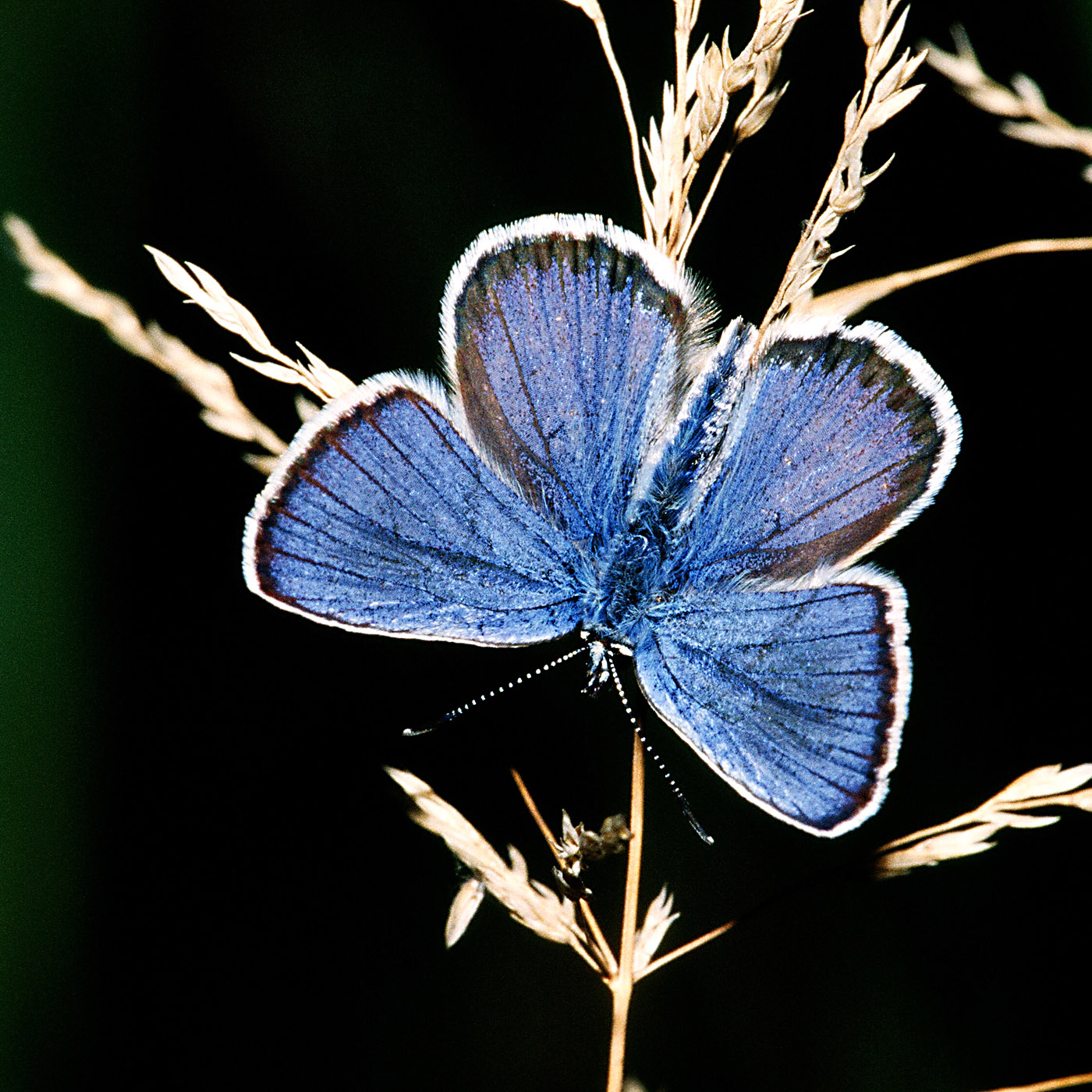
Male

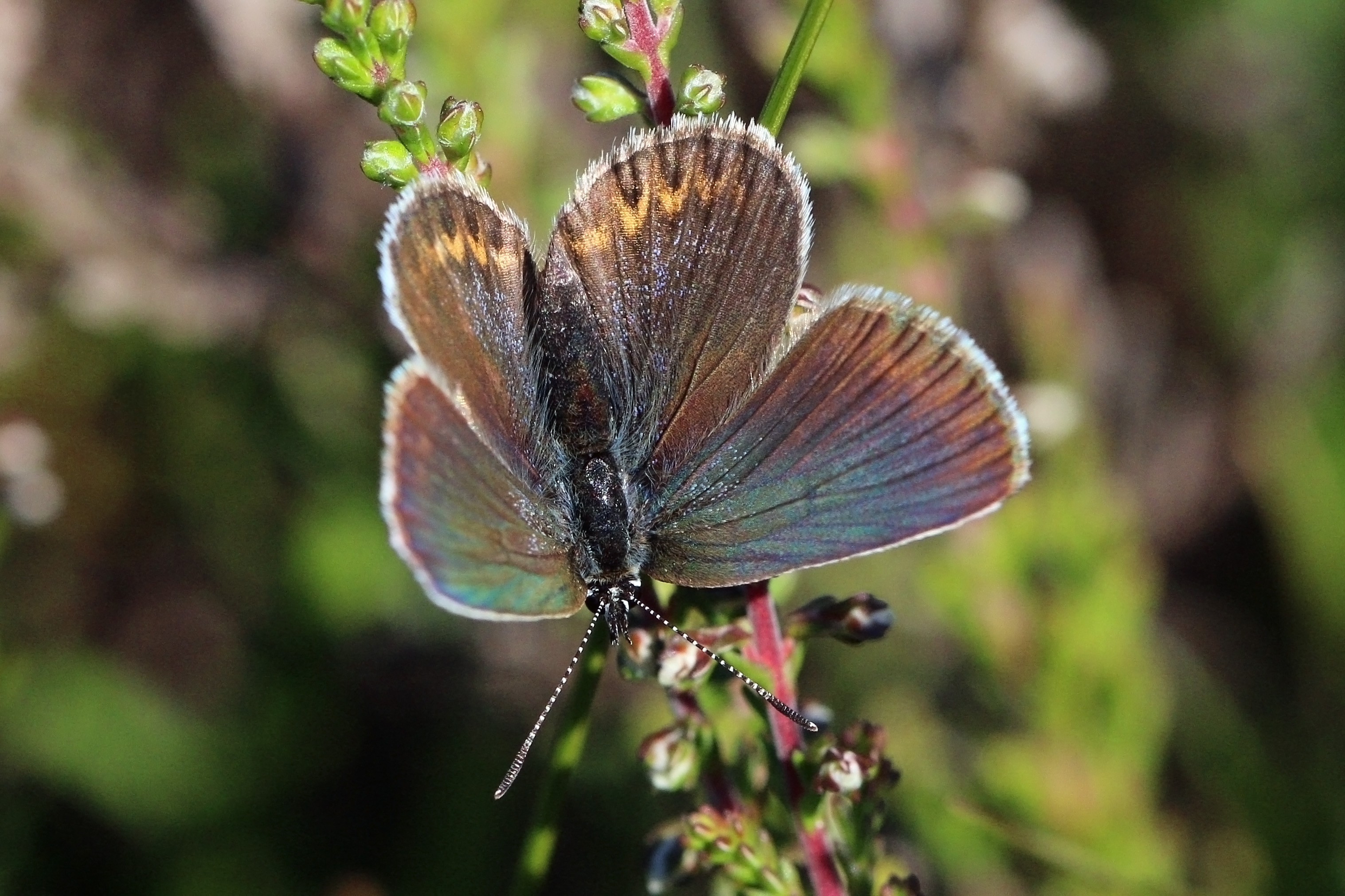
Female

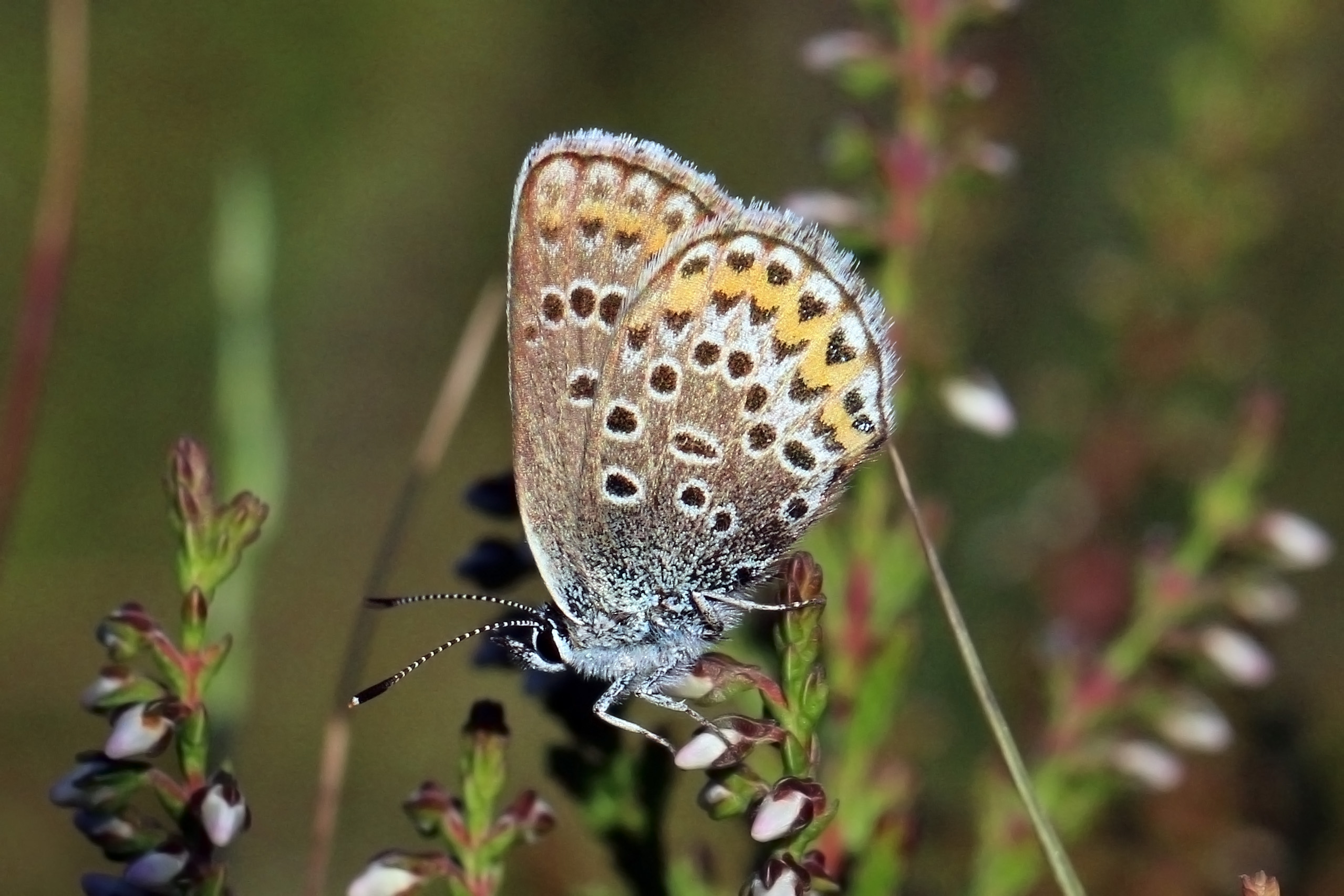
Female

== See also ==
- List of butterflies of Great Britain
