= Amphotis schwarzi =

Scientific classification
- Domain: Eukaryota
- Kingdom: Animalia
- Phylum: Arthropoda
- Class: Insecta
- Order: Coleoptera
- Suborder: Polyphaga
- Infraorder: Cucujiformia
- Family: Nitidulidae
- Tribe: Nitidulini
- Genus: Amphotis
- Species: A. schwarzi

Binomial name
- Amphotis schwarzi Ulke, 1887

Species of beetle

Amphotis schwarzi is a species of sap-feeding beetle in the family Nitidulidae. It is found in North America.
