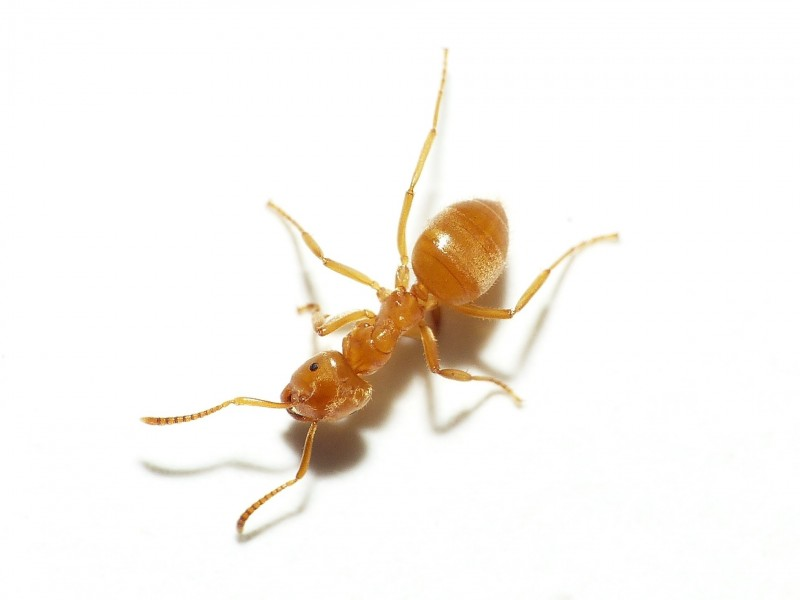
- Lasius umbratus worker ant from North Brabant, Netherlands

Scientific classification
- Kingdom: Animalia
- Phylum: Arthropoda
- Clade: Pancrustacea
- Class: Insecta
- Order: Hymenoptera
- Family: Formicidae
- Subfamily: Formicinae
- Genus: Lasius
- Subgenus: Chthonolasius
- Species: L. umbratus

Binomial name
- Lasius umbratus (Nylander, 1846)

= Lasius umbratus =

Species of ant

Lasius umbratus, colloquially known as the yellow shadow ant and yellow lawn ant, is a Palearctic species of parasitic ant distributed across Eurasia and the Maghreb region of Africa. It was once thought that this species occurred in North America as well, but comparative genomic studies indicate the Afro-Eurasian and American populations are discrete and not closely related enough to represent a single species. The North American populations are now treated as a different species, Lasius aphidicola.

The queens of this species seek out a Lasius niger worker ant to first kill in order to gain the worker ant's scent and then to discreetly sneak inside a L. niger nest. Once inside the L. umbratus queen finds the L. niger queen, and kills her. In Japan, it was observed that a queen took over a colony of Lasius japonicus by spraying an abdominal fluid (presumably formic acid) at a resident queen, inciting the host workers to commit matricide. The worker ants will care for the new queen's larvae and slowly the colony will be made up of only L. umbratus individuals. Ant species like L. fuliginosus find L. umbratus colonies and found their own nest by killing the L. umbratus queen.

They are sometimes confused with L. flavus (yellow meadow ant) but unlike L. flavus they forage for food on the surface.
