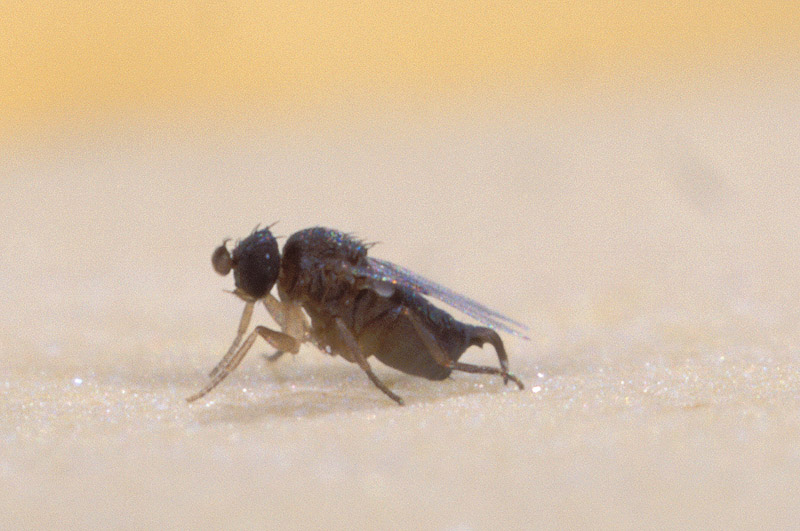

Scientific classification
- Kingdom: Animalia
- Phylum: Arthropoda
- Clade: Pancrustacea
- Class: Insecta
- Order: Diptera
- Family: Phoridae
- Subfamily: Metopininae
- Genus: Pseudacteon; Coquillett, 1907

= Pseudacteon =

Genus of flies

Pseudacteon is a genus of flies in the family Phoridae. There are over 70 described species of Pseudacteon fly. They are also known as ant-decapitating flies due to their parasitic larval stage. An egg is injected by the female fly into the shoulder joint of an ant worker. Soon after, the egg undergoes rapid inflation as it appears to absorb ant hemolymph. This first instar larva migrates into the ant head and consumes the jaw muscle and other tissues, leaving the mandibles hanging and preparing a future exit space. After about two weeks, the ant worker is termed a "zombie" because the fly larva has effectively taken control. The worker leaves the nest and dies in the leaf litter or in a crack in the soil. As it dies, the ant's head falls off because the fly larva releases an enzyme that dissolves the membrane attaching the ant's head to its body. The fly pupates in the detached head capsule, requiring a further two weeks before emerging through the ant's mouth. In tropical, subtropical areas the flies are active all year round, but in temperate regions they are active during all months except the winter months. Several Pseudacteon species were deliberately introduced to the United States to combat via biological control the invasive fire ant species Solenopsis invicta.

== Species ==
- P. aduncus Borgmeier, 1969
- P. affinis Borgmeier, 1962
- P. antiguensis (Malloch, 1912)
- P. arcuatus Borgmeier, 1969
- P. australis Borgmeier, 1962
- P. bifidus Brown & Morrison, 1999
- P. bispinosus Borgmeier & Prado, 1975
- P. borgmeieri Schmitz, 1923
- P. borgmeieri Schmitz, 1923
- P. botulpalpatus Disney & Mikhailovskaya, 2000
- P. brevicauda Schmitz, 1925
- P. browni Disney, 1991
- P. bulbosus Brown, Folgarait & Gilbert, 2003
- P. calderensis Calcaterra, 2007
- P. californiensis Disney, 1982
- P. caudalis Borgmeier, 1923
- P. claridgei Disney, 2000
- P. comatus Borgmeier, 1925
- P. conicornis Borgmeier, 1962
- P. convexicauda Borgmeier, 1962
- P. crawfordi Coquillett, 1907
- P. crinifer Beyer, 1966
- P. cultellatus Borgmeier, 1925
- P. curriei (Malloch, 1912)
- P. curvatus Borgmeier, 1925
- P. dentiger Borgmeier, 1962
- P. disneyi Pesquero, 2000
- P. dorymyrmecis Borgmeier, 1925
- P. fennicus Schmitz, 1927
- P. formicarum (Verrall, 1877)
- P. fowleri Pesquero, 2000
- P. furvicolor (Beyer, 1959)
- P. genebrae Mattos & Orr, 2002
- P. grandis Greene, 1940
- P. hexasetalis Liu & Cai, 2013
- P. javensis (Brues, 1915)
- P. lenkoi Borgmeier & Prado, 1975
- P. litoralis Borgmeier, 1925
- P. lonicauda Borgmeier & Prado, 1975
- P. lontrae Mattos & Orr, 2002
- P. lundbecki Schmitz, 1924
- P. lusitanus Schmitz, 1938
- P. nocens Borgmeier, 1926
- P. nudicornis Borgmeier, 1925
- P. obtusatus Liu & Cai, 2013
- P. obtusus Borgmeier, 1925
- P. onyx Steyskal, 1944
- P. palpatus Schmitz, 1938
- P. pradei Borgmeier, 1925
- P. pullum Mikhailovskaya, 1995
- P. pusillus Borgmeier, 1938
- P. quadrisetalis Liu & Cai, 2013
- P. rudisetosus Disney & Mikhailovskaya, 2000
- P. setipalpatus Disney & Mikhailovskaya, 2000
- P. setosus Disney & Mikhailovskaya, 2000
- P. simplex Borgmeier, 1969
- P. solenopsidis (Schmitz, 1914)
- P. spatulata (Malloch, 1912)
- P. tricuspis Borgmeier, 1925
- P. tubiceroides Disney, 2000
- P. wasmanni (Schmitz, 1914)
