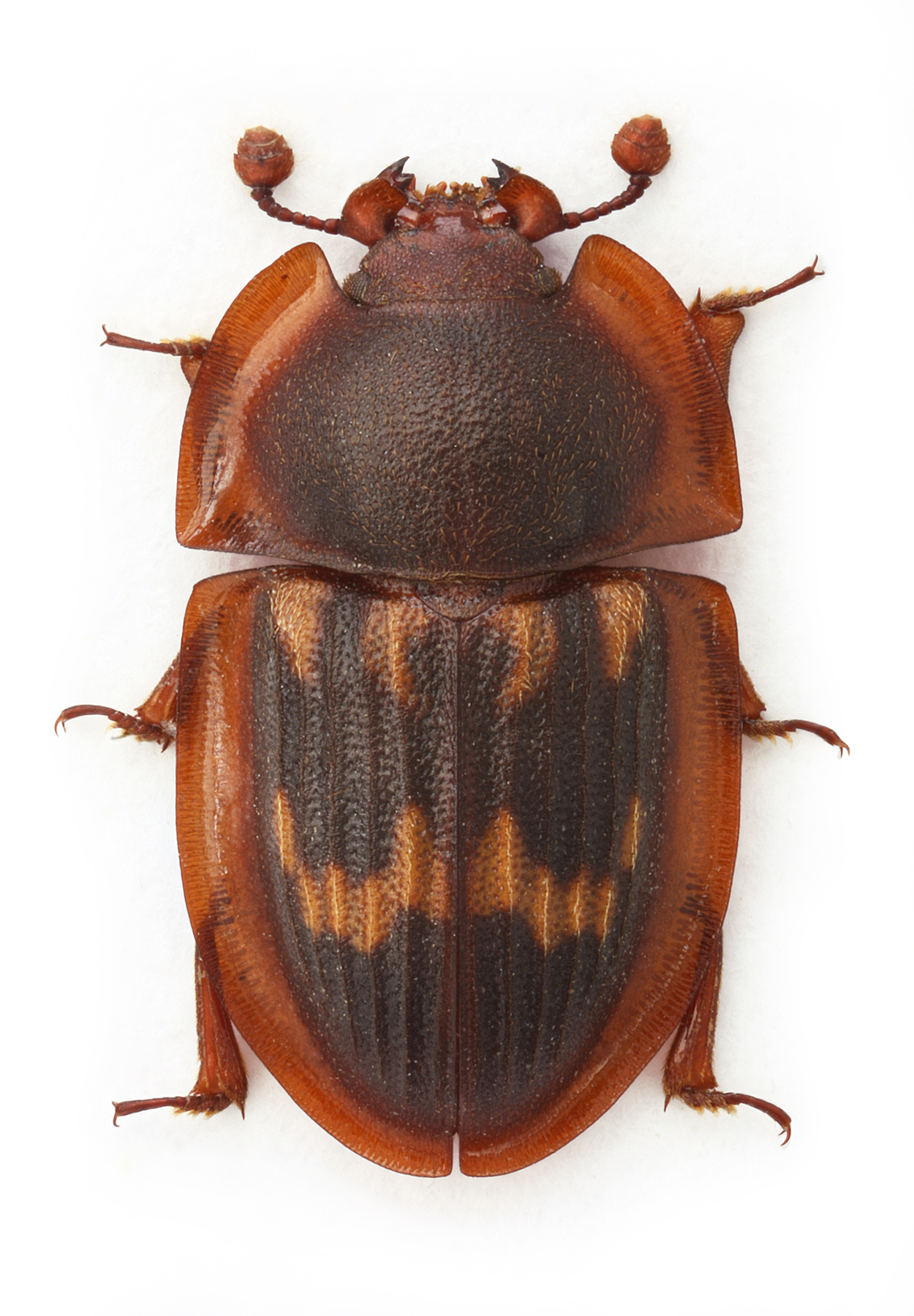
- Amphotis marginata

Scientific classification
- Kingdom: Animalia
- Phylum: Arthropoda
- Class: Insecta
- Order: Coleoptera
- Suborder: Polyphaga
- Infraorder: Cucujiformia
- Family: Nitidulidae
- Subfamily: Nitidulinae
- Tribe: Nitidulini
- Genus: Amphotis; Erichson, 1843

= Amphotis =

Genus of beetles

Amphotis is a genus of sap-feeding beetles in the family Nitidulidae. There are about eight described species in Amphotis.

== Species ==
These eight species belong to the genus Amphotis:

- Amphotis bella Heer, 1847
- Amphotis depressa Theobald, 1937
- Amphotis marginata (Fabricius, 1781)
- Amphotis martini C.Brisout de Barneville, 1878
- Amphotis oeningensis Heer, 1862
- Amphotis orientalis Reiche, 1861
- Amphotis schwarzi Ulke, 1887
- Amphotis ulkei LeConte, 1866
