= Pseudacteon tricuspis =

Scientific classification
- Kingdom: Animalia
- Phylum: Arthropoda
- Clade: Pancrustacea
- Class: Insecta
- Order: Diptera
- Family: Phoridae
- Genus: Pseudacteon
- Species: P. tricuspis

Binomial name
- Pseudacteon tricuspis Borgmeier, 1925

Species of fly

Pseudacteon tricuspis (commonly referred to as a phorid fly or fire ant decapitating fly) is a parasitoid phorid fly that decapitates its host, the imported Solenopsis invicta fire ant. Female P. tricuspis deposit their eggs directly into the fire ant host. There are over 70 described species within the Pseudacteon genus, which parasitize a variety of ant species. However, P. tricuspis is very specific to its host ant and will not attack other native ant species, making it a good biological control against the fire ant. P. tricuspis was introduced into the United States for this purpose, and the species P. tricuspis is now also been found in South America, Europe, and Asia. Deposition into the ant host determines the sex of the egg, which grows within the host until adulthood, killing and decapitating the host in the process. Interestingly, P. tricuspis has a male-biased sex ratio, where the males are smaller than the females.

== Description ==
Pseudacteon tricuspis is a species of the Pseudateon genus and a member of the family Phoridae, which is commonly called scuttle flies, humped-back flies, and phorid flies. Eight native Pseudacteon species parasitize native fire ants in the United States (Plowes 2009).

The adult P. tricuspis flies are 0.9-1.5mm in length. The mandibles of the larvae are unable to chew or digest food and are instead used to aid in movement and anchoring within the host. The ovipositor, which is the organ that is used by the female to lay eggs, looks different in each species within the Pseudacteon genus and can be used to distinguish the species from one another.

== Distribution ==
Pseudacteon tricuspis is widely distributed around Argentina, Brazil, and other parts of South America, Europe, and Asia. About two dozen species of the genus parasitize native fire ants in South America. Since its introduction to the United States, the species can be found across the country, but is concentrated along the south east parts, including Florida, Alabama, Arkansas, and Louisiana.

=== Habitat ===
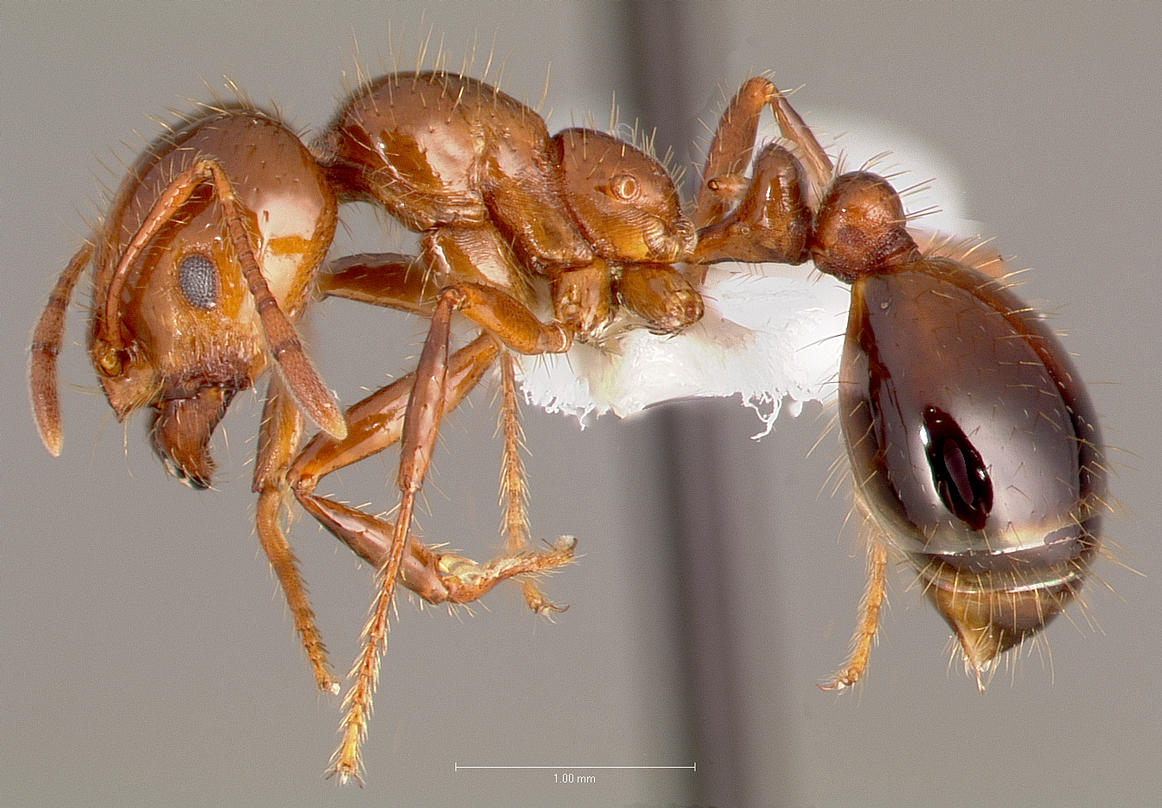
Solenopsis invicta, host of P. tricuspis

Pseudacteon tricuspis is predominantly found within the natural range of where the host Solenopsis invicta fire ant can be found. Climates range from rain forests to swamps to dry areas. They do not prefer any specific sort of habitat, partially because P. tricuspis live the majority of their lives within the host. P. tricuspis is not known to be attracted in large groups to anything but the host ant.

== Life history ==
Pseudacteon tricuspis will spend a majority of its life cycle within the host ant, even after the host dies. Development time from egg deposition to mature adult is 5 to 12 weeks, depending on temperature (with increased longevity at lower temperatures). Sex determination is dependent on the size of the host ant that the egg is deposited within. The female flies have a greater average fitness if they are using larger host fire ants. However, the exact mechanism of how this sex determination occurs is unknown.

=== Egg ===
The eggs of the fly are approximately 130 μm long by 20 μm wide. They have the shape of a torpedo and are injected into the thorax of the worker fire ant by the mother. The egg usually takes around 4–5 days to finish embryonic development and hatch.

=== Larvae ===
The fly hatches from the egg in the first instar and will usually shed their serosa within 24 hours, although the process has been recorded to last up to 20 days. By day four the second instar typically will have situated itself fully within the ant's head. During both the second and third instar the fly maggot relies heavily on ant hemolymph for nutrition. During this time, the host fire ant appears and behaves normally because the parasitoid fly does not consume tissue. The third instar will then release an enzyme or hormone that will loosen and decapitate the head of the host ant, which the fly then eats and resides inside.

=== Pupae ===
The pupae are opaque and have a pale color. The fly will stay inside the head capsule and grow, filling the shape of the host’s head capsule. The females will have developed fully formed wings. Pupal development takes around 2–6 weeks, dependent on temperature.

=== Adult ===
When the adult fly is fully grown, emergence from the host ant takes only a few seconds in total, and the adult is ready to mate and lay eggs within the next few hours. The adult lifespan is only 3 to 5 days.

== Food resources ==
The flies use fire ants' semiochemicals to locate the fire ant species Solenopsis invicta and can do so from up to 50 meters away. While other species within the Pseudacteon genus have been found to be generalists and feed on a wide range of resources, in the field the P. tricuspis fly will only feed on its host. However, research in laboratories has found that feeding the fly sugar has a significant effect on increasing the lifespan of the fly, with longevity increasing by a factor of 2 to 3. In the field, the parasitoids could potentially obtain sugar from nectar or honeydew, but provision of supplemental sugar sources around release sites of the fly may improve the success rate of the fly as a control for the fire ant.

== Mating ==
Males have a long sensilla subtype within their antennae that is absent in the females. While its purpose is not completely clear, it is thought to detect female odors, such as sex pheromones, during mate search. Both sexes are also attracted to the odor of the host fire ant and mating occurs while the females are looking for suitable hosts. Females will track the movement and the behavior of the fire ant hosts while males will hover and spin around in the air looking for females. After locating one, the male will grab onto the female, and copulation takes less than a second. During this process, neither sex is able to keep flying, causing both to drop to the ground. Both the males and females of P. tricuspis will mate several times. The female P. tricuspis may produce from 100 to 300 eggs during its short mating time, but will only insert a single egg into each worker ant.

=== Sexual dimorphism ===
The species has sexual dimorphism, with the females being much larger than the males. This is likely occurs because of the females being aggressive and fighting with other females over depositing their own eggs within a host. The females fight over the larger host ants to deposit their eggs in as these eggs will have a larger chance of survival. Larger females will most likely win these fights, leading to females growing larger than males.

=== Sex ratio ===
The species typically has a sex ratio that is biased towards males (usually in a 2:1 ratio). This is attributed to the relative size of the host ants, which happen to have more large individuals than smaller individuals. There is a lower number of hosts that can support the development of female flies, making the female sex rarer. This creates intraspecific competition between the P. tricuspis females who compete with each other in trying to oviposit within the same host. The females exhibit aggressive and territorial behavior.

== Attack ==
The fly exhibits attacking behavior towards the Solenopsis invicta fire ant when attempting to oviposit. The adult female flies will hover around 3 to 5mm above their chosen host ant and orient their ovipositor towards the host. They will then quickly dive in and inject the egg into the thorax of the worker host. The fly will avoid attempting to oviposit in the alates of the colony and will instead exclusively attack worker ants. Successful egg deposition only occurs around 8-35% of the time.

== Activity ==
The daily activity of the P. tricuspis fly starts very low in the early morning, increases gradually, then peaks at midday. Maximum male emergence has been seen to occur around one hour before maximum female emergence. In terms of seasonal activity, the fly population is seen throughout the year, but is highest in the fall and summer and lowest in the winter and spring. This correlates to a density dependent response to the availability of the fire ant host, which is greater in the fall due to the frequent rainfall.

== Biological control ==
Pseudacteon tricuspis was the first species of Pseudacteon fly successfully used as a biological control agent for the imported red fire ant in the US. Imported red fire ant Solenopsis invicta was accidentally introduced into the United States in Alabama in the 1930s. Since then, its populated area has expanded across the country, including California. The ants are extremely detrimental to the environment of the United States, costing around a billion dollars every year in damage and impacting native fauna and habitats. While chemical pesticides have been tested as a way of controlling the ants, the solution is not environmentally or financially sustainable. Between the summer of 1997 and fall of 1999, the P. tricuspis fly was released in eight different sites over the mounds of the fire ant located throughout North Florida as a self-sustained way of controlling the fire ant, with six of these sites having a survival population after the first winter. Over the years, the population of P. tricuspis fly at these sites continued to grow and expanded beyond the area of the release sites, and in the fall of 2000 the sites fused into one large occupied area. The purpose of the P. tricuspis fly was to stress the fire ant population in order to shift the balance back in favor of the native ants in America. While the exact impact of the fly on the fire ant population is unknown, the fire ant has evolved to develop specific defense mechanisms against the fly, indicating that there is some sort of large population wide impact on the survival of the fire ant colonies. Additionally, in the presence of attack by P. tricuspis, the fire ant will typically reduce its foraging and resource retrieval rates significantly, by almost 84%.
