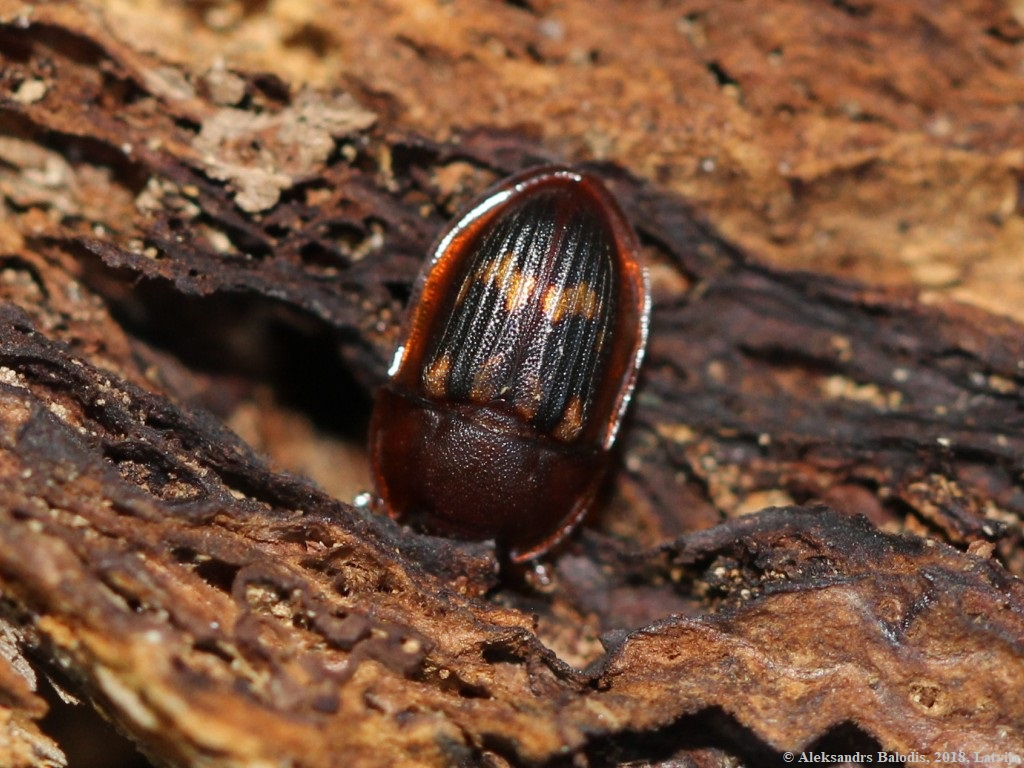

Scientific classification
- Kingdom: Animalia
- Phylum: Arthropoda
- Class: Insecta
- Order: Coleoptera
- Suborder: Polyphaga
- Infraorder: Cucujiformia
- Family: Nitidulidae
- Genus: Amphotis
- Species: A. marginata

Binomial name
- Amphotis marginata (Fabricius, 1781)

= Amphotis marginata =

Species of beetle

Amphotis marginata is a nitidulid beetle.

== Description ==
The beetles are 3.8–5.8 mm in size.

== Symbiotic relationship ==
Beetles of the species Amphotis marginata have a kleptoparasitic relationship with ants, specifically Lasius fuliginosus. Adults primarily rely on these ants for their nutrition. They are able to get the ants to release the harvested food by mimicking the food-begging signals used between ants on the foraging trails.

Solicitation of Trophallaxis by A. marginata beetles from L. fuliginosus host foragers.

== Range ==
Occurrences registered through the sources aggregated by GBIF, suggests that Amphotis marginata exists mainly in Europe. Occurrences have been registered from the south of Scandinavia to the north of Spain.

== Habitat ==
Due to the symbiotic relationship with Lasius fuliginosus, Amphotis marginata has a habitat close to the foraging paths of these ants.
