= Lasius aphidicola =

- Lasius aphidicola reproductive adult from Ontario, Canada

Scientific classification
- Kingdom: Animalia
- Phylum: Arthropoda
- Clade: Pancrustacea
- Class: Insecta
- Order: Hymenoptera
- Family: Formicidae
- Subfamily: Formicinae
- Genus: Lasius
- Subgenus: Chthonolasius
- Species: L. aphidicola

Binomial name
- Lasius aphidicola (Walsh, 1863)

Species of ant

Lasius aphidicola, colloquially known as the shaded fuzzy ant, recently found to be distinct from the morphologically similar Palearctic Lasius umbratus.

For more information, see Antwiki
