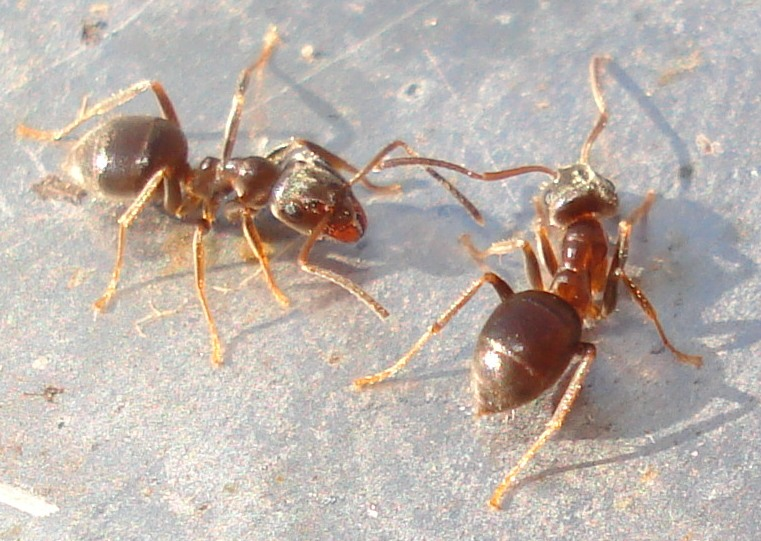

Scientific classification
- Kingdom: Animalia
- Phylum: Arthropoda
- Clade: Pancrustacea
- Class: Insecta
- Order: Hymenoptera
- Family: Formicidae
- Subfamily: Formicinae
- Genus: Lasius
- Subgenus: Lasius; Latreille, 1804
- Species: L. alienus

Binomial name
- Lasius alienus Förster, 1850

= Lasius alienus =

Species of ant

Lasius alienus, or cornfield ant, is a species of ant in the subfamily Formicinae (family Formicidae). Workers have a length of about 2–4 mm, Queens are larger (7–9 mm).

== Distribution ==
They live in Europe, from Spain to the Caucasus; populations in North America which were originally called Cornfield Ants are now considered to be a separate species, Lasius americanus.

== Genetics ==
Genome type Lasius alienus: 0,31 m (C value)

== Mutualism ==
The silver-studded blue butterfly, Plebejus argus, lays eggs near nests of the ant L. alienus, forming a mutualistic relationship. This mutualistic relationship benefits the adult butterfly by reducing the need for parental investment. Once the eggs hatch, the ants chaperone the larvae, averting the attacks of predatory organisms like wasps and spiders as well as parasites. In return, the ants receive a saccharine secretion fortified with amino acids from an eversible gland on the larvae's back. As first instar larvae prepare to pupate, the ants carry the larvae into their nests. Once the larvae become pupae, the ants continue to provide protection against predation and parasitism.
