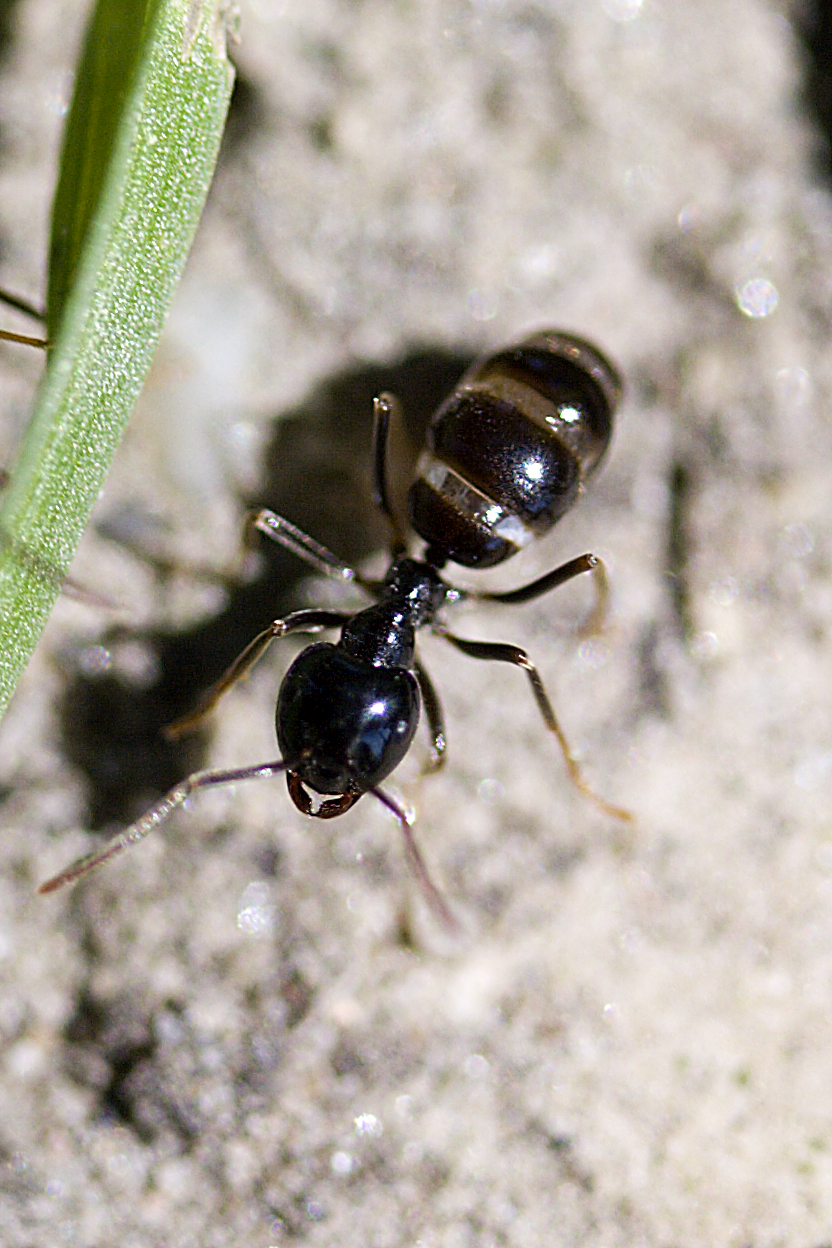
- Lasius fuliginosus worker

Scientific classification
- Kingdom: Animalia
- Phylum: Arthropoda
- Clade: Pancrustacea
- Class: Insecta
- Order: Hymenoptera
- Family: Formicidae
- Subfamily: Formicinae
- Genus: Lasius
- Species: L. fuliginosus

Binomial name
- Lasius fuliginosus (Latreille, 1798)

Synonyms
- Formica fuliginosa Latreille, 1798

= Lasius fuliginosus =

Species of ant

Lasius fuliginosus, also known as the jet ant or jet black ant, is a species of ant in the subfamily Formicinae.

== Distribution ==
This species has a wide distribution in Europe and Asia, from Portugal and Ireland in the west, Finland in the north to Italy in the south, and eastwards to Korea and Japan. In the UK, records suggest that while occasionally found further North before 1970, it is now found mostly south of The Wash, in East Anglia and Southern England, with a few colonies found in Ireland.

== Description ==
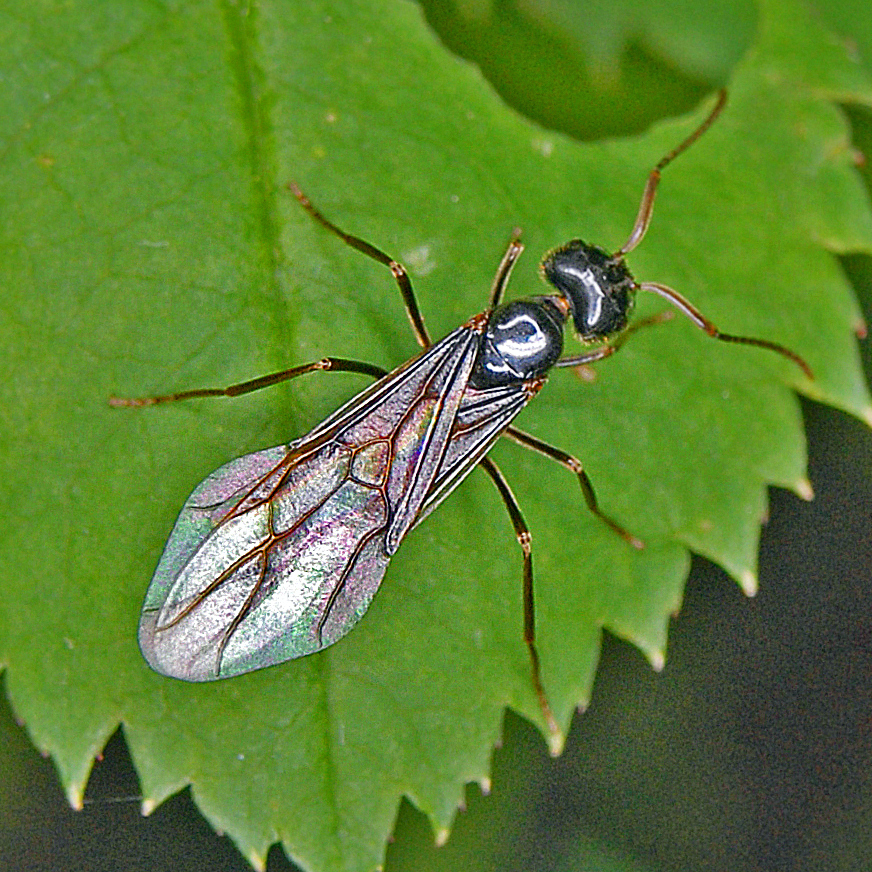
Winged queen

Video clip of Lasius fuliginosus

Workers of Lasius fuliginosus have a black shiny colour, a relatively large head, broadly cordate, with a distinct posterior emargination and rounded occipital lobes. Over the dorsum is present a sparse pubescence and scattered erect hairs. Legs are brownish yellow.

Queens have a black shiny colour and a shape similar to the workers, pubescence and body hairs are more abundant, but the orifice of the metapleural gland lacks guard hairs. The head is heart-shaped, broadly emarginated and wider that alitrunk. Moreover the scutum overhangs the pronotal convexity. Legs are brownish yellow and rather longer than in workers. In males, suberect hairs are present on extensor tibial surface and/or on antennal scapes.

Workers can reach a length of about 4–6 mm, while females are larger (6–6.5 mm). Small males reach a length of 4.5–5 mm).

== Physiology and behavior ==
To communicate alarm, the species has been known to dispense dendrolasin (C_{15}H_{22}O), a terpenoid compound, from their mandibular glands.

The species is associated with the nitidulid beetle Amphotis marginata, called the "highwayman" of the local ant world. The beetles occupy shelters along the foraging trails of L. fuliginosis. When night comes, they patrol the trails and take food from the ants returning to the nest. They specifically target those ants with a lot of food in their bodies. They trick ants into regurgitating into their mouths, a common act between ants and other animals called trophallaxis. The ants soon realize they have been tricked and begin to fight the beetle. The beetle responds by removing itself from the ants' mouths and flattening its body to the ground in a way that ants cannot roll them over and effectively combat them.

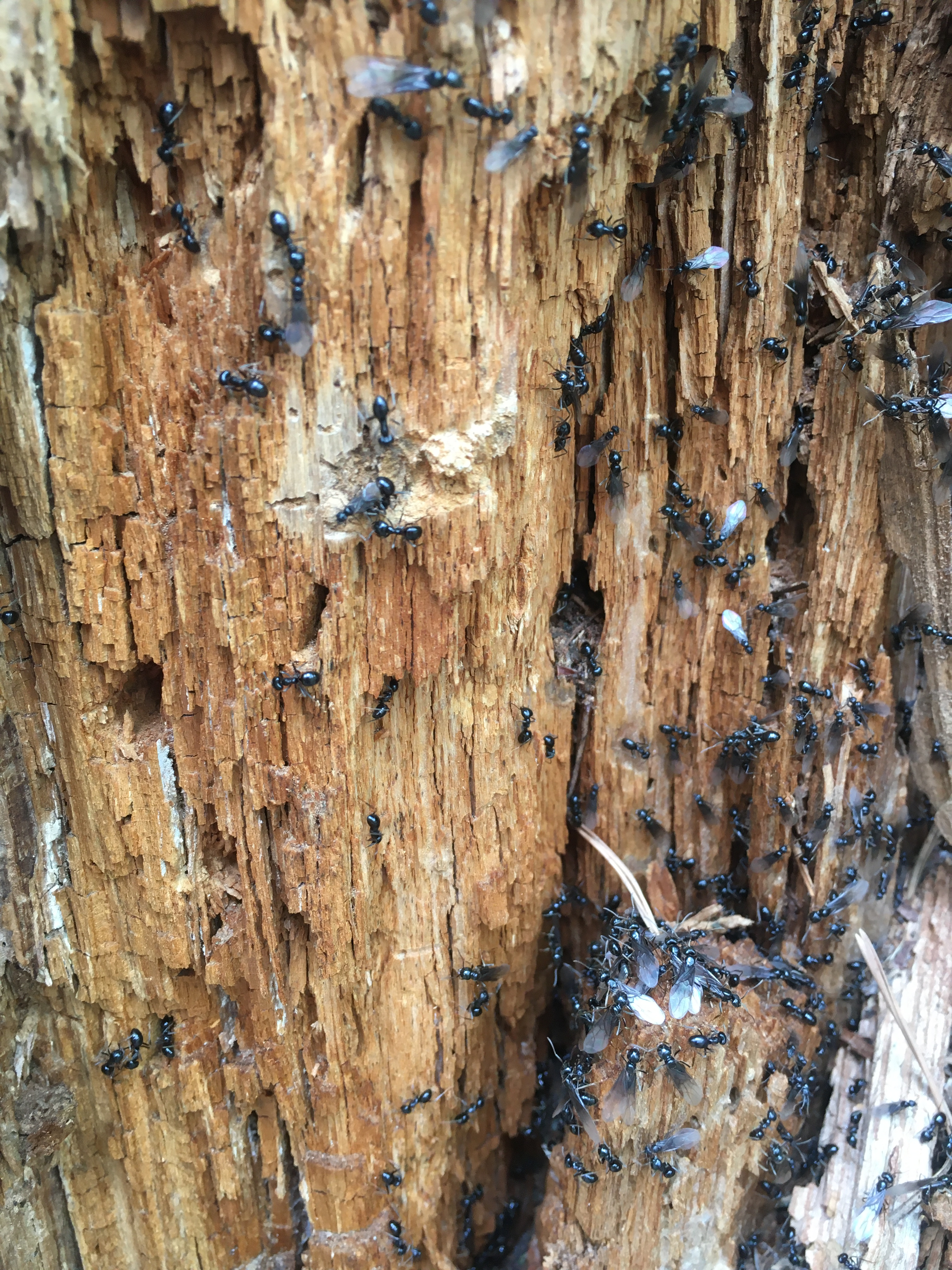
Lasius fuliginosus on chewed wood

== Environment ==
The species builds a "cardboard" nest in old hollow trees, using "board" – a mixture of chewed wood with saliva similar to termites. A nest contains only one queen, but a large colony can contain as many as 15,000 workers.

The carton nest walls are strengthened by ascomycete fungal hyphae in a symbiotic relationship between the ants and fungi. The ants supply the fungi with shredded wood, honeydew harvested from aphids, and nectar, and they selectively weed out unsuitable fungi, while the fungi provide added structural support for the colony and are thought to be dispersed by the ants.

Like other black ants they tend populations of aphids for their honeydew, and can often be seen travelling in both directions, following scent-trails for long distances to their source of food, which is often a tree. The trails the species make to forage and transport food commonly last for months. As the workers clear the paths of vegetation and debris, making the path easy for massive amounts of ants to travel efficiently. They rarely carry other insects back to the nest.

== Reproduction as a hyperparasite ==
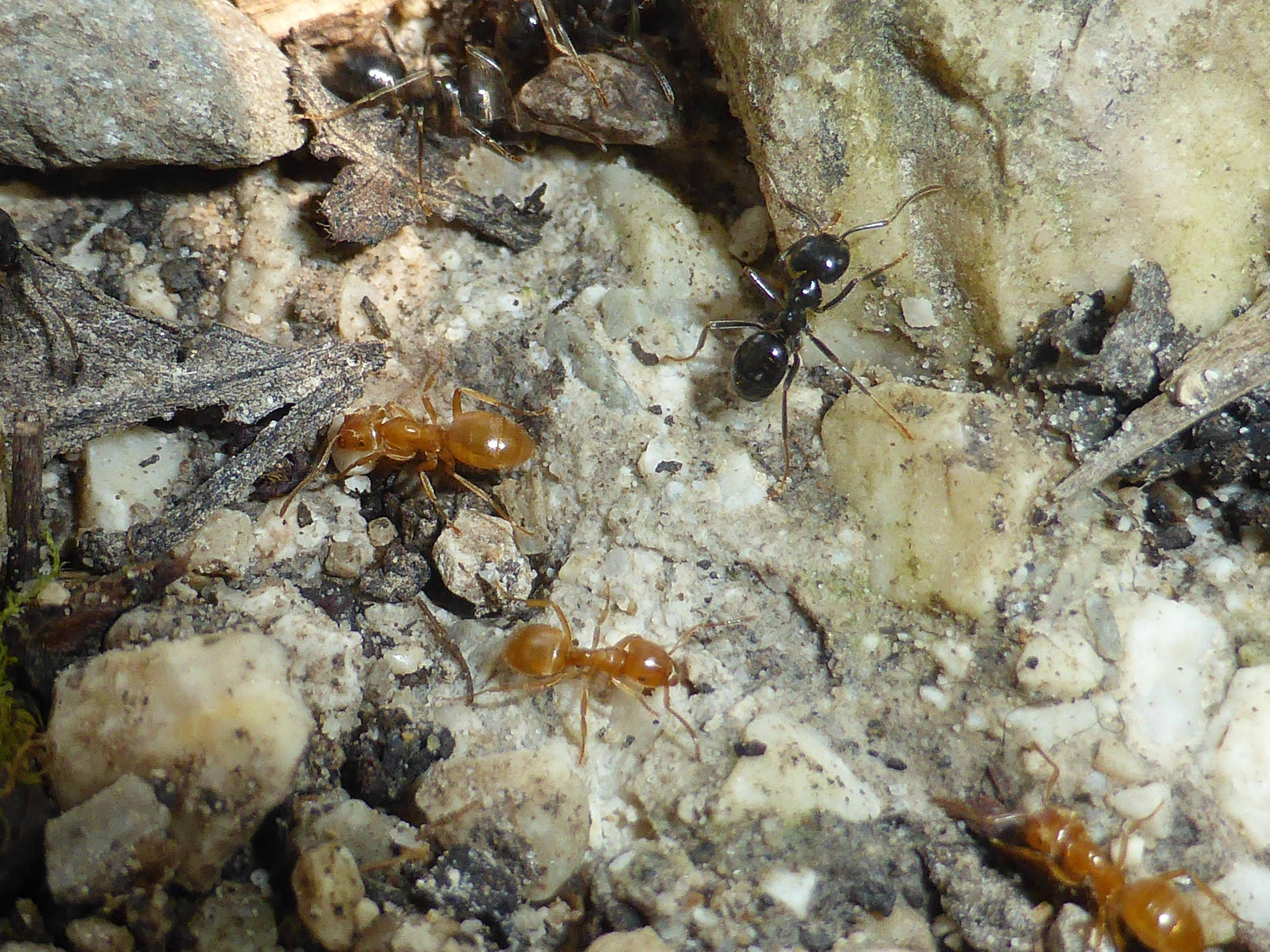
Mixed colony with workers Lasius (Chtonolasius) sp. (red) and Lasius fuliginosus (black) after being parasitized by a queen of the latter species.

While other black ants such as Lasius niger found their own nest, a post-nuptial queen of Lasius fuliginosus cannot found her own nest, but establishes a nest through social parasitism in another species of the same genus – Lasius umbratus, a rare yellow ant with an underground habit (unlike the common yellow ant Lasius flavus which makes small mounds in grass and lawns). She kills or ousts the existing queen and lays eggs, which the existing workers tend. Her offspring workers then slowly take over the nest. Lasius umbratus also establishes its nest in a similar way, by taking over the nest of Lasius niger, the common black ant, so Lasius fuliginosus is sometimes referred to as a hyperparasite.

This trick of taking over the nest of a different species of ant offers considerable survival advantage. In Lasius niger, the smaller but much more common (in the UK) black ant species, a queen founds its own nest by laying eggs and then feeding the new larvae with a fluid produced by breaking down its own muscles; a process that leaves her very weak as she cannot tend the larvae and forage for food at the same time.
