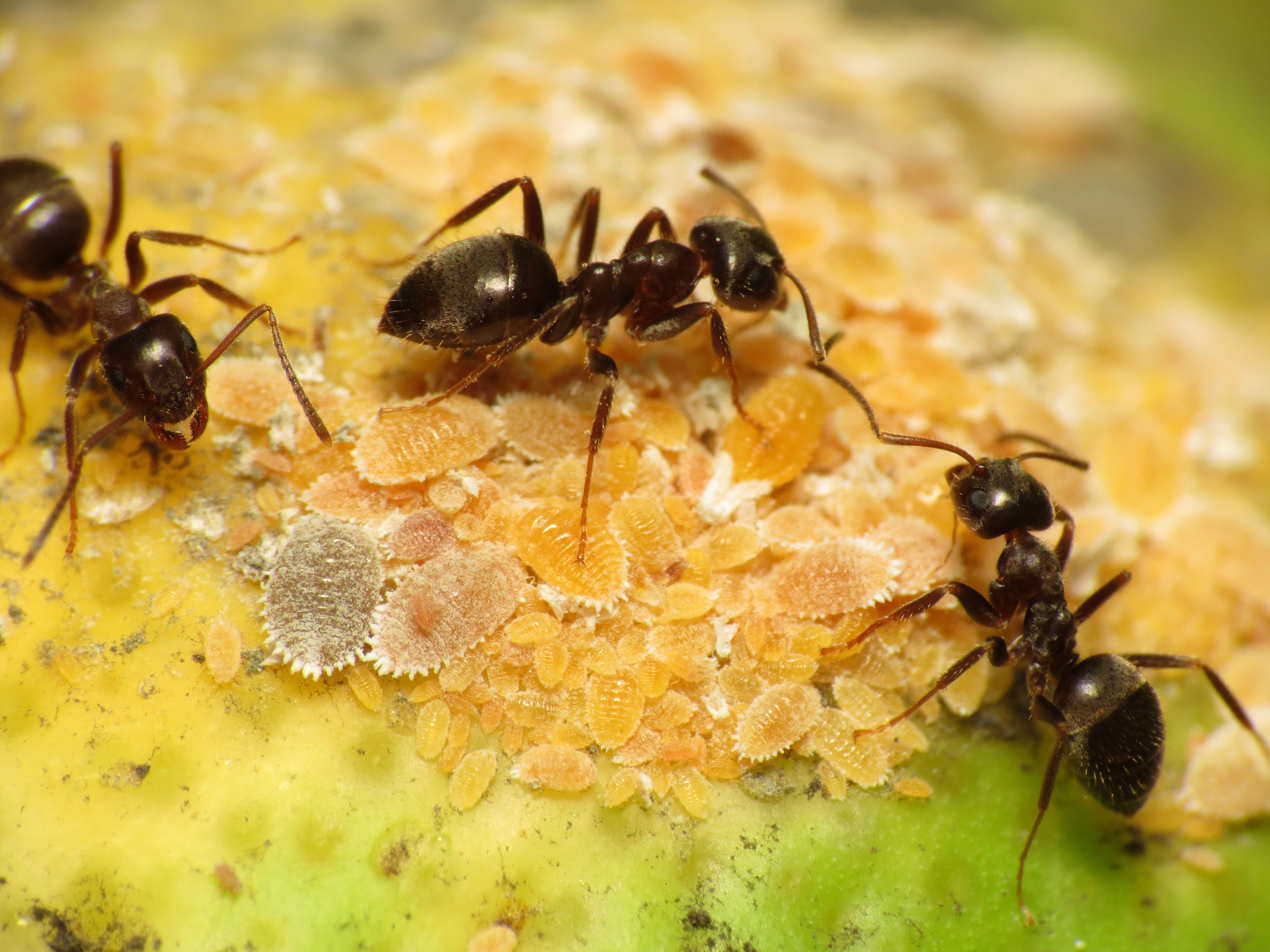
- Black garden ants tending to mealybugs

Scientific classification
- Kingdom: Animalia
- Phylum: Arthropoda
- Clade: Pancrustacea
- Class: Insecta
- Order: Hymenoptera
- Family: Formicidae
- Subfamily: Formicinae
- Genus: Lasius
- Species: L. niger

Binomial name
- Lasius niger (Linnaeus, 1758)

= Black garden ant =

Species of ant

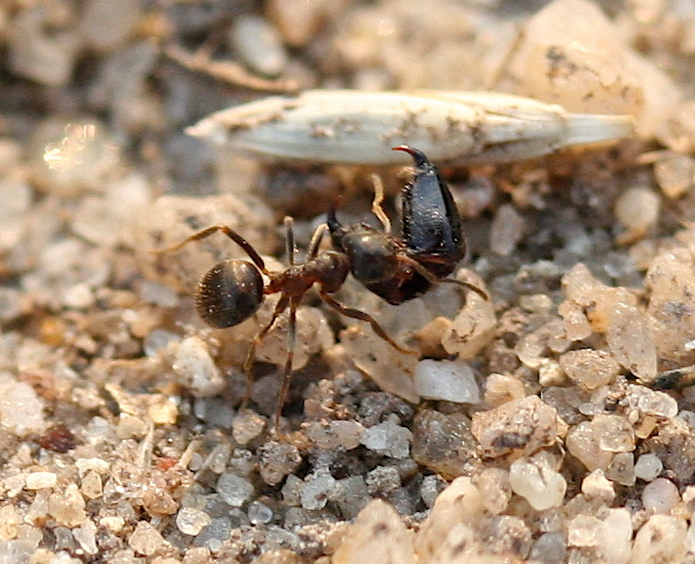
Black garden ant with the mandibles of an unidentified creature.

The black garden ant (Lasius niger), also known as the common black ant, is a formicine ant, the type species of the genus Lasius, which is found across Europe and in some parts of North America, and believed to inhabit certain parts of Asia. The European species was split into two species; L. niger, which is found in open areas; and L. platythorax, which is found in forest habitats. It is monogynous, meaning colonies contain a single queen.

Lasius niger colonies normally range from 4,000 to 7,000 workers, but can reach 40,000 in rare cases. An L. niger queen can live for at least 19 years, but the claim that they can live up to 29 years stems from a miscalculation. Lasius niger queens in the early stages of founding can have two to three other queens in the nest. They will tolerate each other until the first workers come, then it is most likely they will fight until one queen remains. Under laboratory conditions, workers can live at least four years.

Lasius niger is host to the silver-studded blue butterfly Plebejus argus; it is also host to a number of temporary social parasites of the Lasius mixtus group, including Lasius mixtus and Lasius umbratus.

== Appearance ==
Caste	Monogyne
Queen phenotype	9 mm long, glossy black color but appears to have slight brown stripes on her abdomen. The queen can reach 6–9mm in length and is smaller as a new queen. After a queen mates, she removes her wings and digests her wing muscles as food over the winter.
Male phenotype	3.5–4.5 mm long, slim, colour black. Only produced by queens when the nuptial flights are approaching. They appear with a dark glossy body with a different shape from the workers, almost resembling a wasp in appearance. They have wing muscles which stand out from the rest of the body. They are 5–7mm long and have delicate wings.
Worker phenotype	3–5 mm long, workers are dark glossy black. As the colony gets older it has been known for workers to increase in size over generations.
Major phenotype	Lasius niger do not create a major caste.
Nest building	Nests underground, commonly under stones, but also in rotten wood, and under roots.
Nutrition	Nectar, small insects such as codling moth larvae, fruit, will farm aphids, cockroaches, beetles.

== Life cycle ==
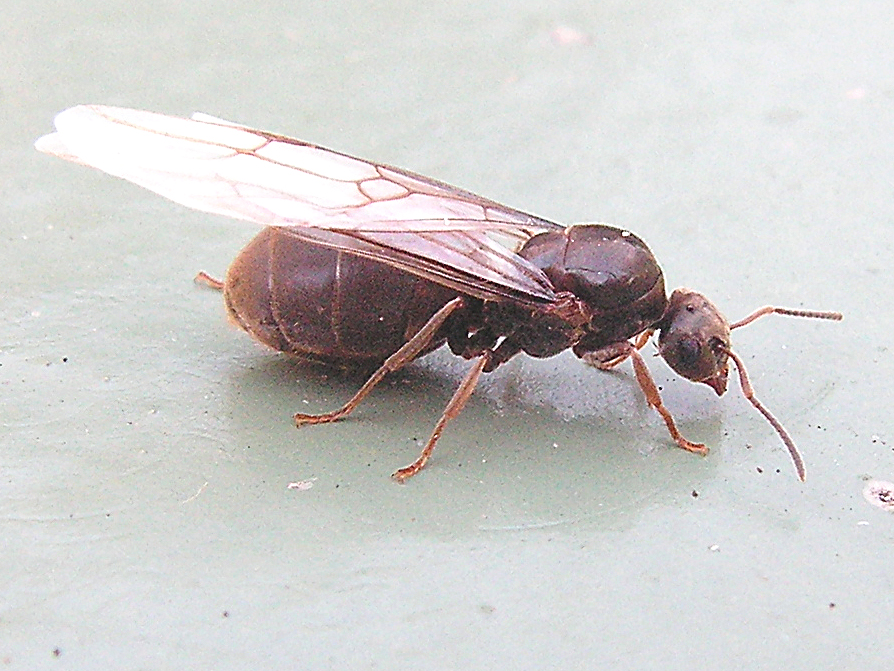
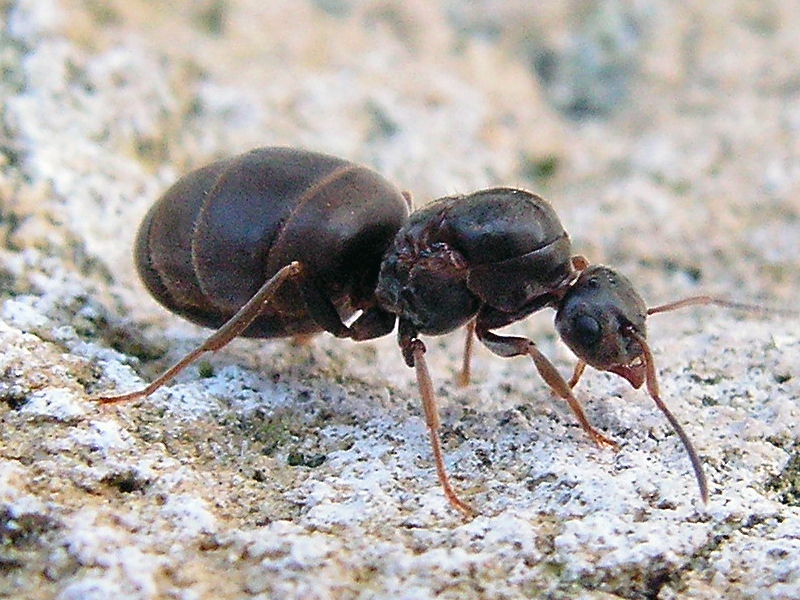
L. niger queens with and without wings

=== Mating flights ===
Ants mate on the wing, so "flying ants" are alates (reproductive individuals), which include males and gynes (virgin queens). The mating (or nuptial) flights of Lasius niger usually occur around June to September throughout the species' range; in North America, flights usually occur during autumn, whereas in Europe they generally take place during the hot summer months of July and August. Flights can contain thousands of winged males and females.

Disparities between local weather conditions can cause nuptial flights to be out of phase amongst widespread populations of L. niger. During long-lasting, hot summers, flights can take place simultaneously across the country, but overcast weather with local patches of sunshine results in a far less synchronized emergence of alates.

Once the queens have mated, they will land and discard their wings and begin to find a suitable place to dig a tunnel. Meanwhile, males generally only live for a day or two after the mating flights and will then die.

=== New nest ===
After removing her wings, a queen will move quickly to find moist ground, then start digging a tunnel. Once the tunnel has been completed, the queen will block the entrance and retreat to the bottom. Subsequently, she will dig out a small chamber. This will serve as the claustral chamber of the new colony. Generally, a queen will begin to lay eggs immediately after the construction of the chamber, and the eggs will develop to imagines in 8–10 weeks. Until the eggs hatch and the larvae grow to maturity, a Lasius niger queen will not eat, relying on the protein of her wing muscles to be broken down and digested. In some cases, a Lasius niger queen may eat some of her own eggs in order to survive.

Video of a L. niger queen digging a founding nest during a nuptial flight (July 2025, Helsinki, Finland

=== Colony established ===
The first worker ants that emerge are very small compared to later generations. At this point, the workers immediately begin to expand the nest and care for the queen and brood; they eventually remove the seal from the entrance to the nest and begin to forage above ground. This is a critical time for the colony as they need to gather food quickly to support future growth and particularly to feed the starved queen, who would have lost around 50% of her body weight. From this point on, the queen's egg laying output will increase significantly, now becoming her sole function. The later generations of worker ants will be bigger, stronger and more aggressive because there is more nutrition for them at the larval stage. The initial brood being fed only by the scarce resources available to a queen will be much smaller than the brood supported by a team of foraging and nursing workers. If workers are able to find food, the early colony will see an exponential rise in population. After several years, once the colony is well established, the queen will lay eggs that will become queens and males. Black ants often make large nests with extensive tunnel connections.

=== Egg to ant ===
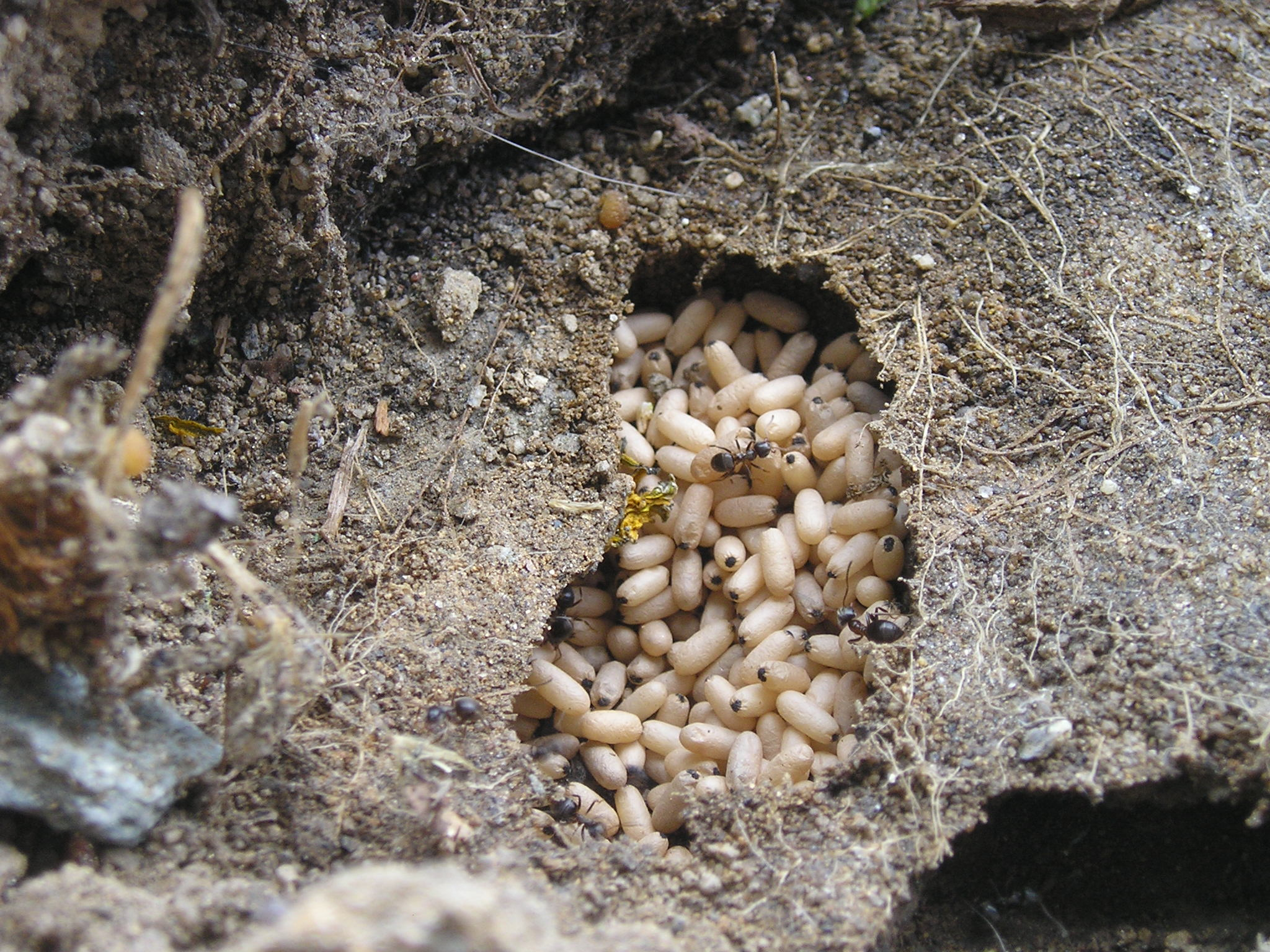
Lasius niger nest

Lasius niger, like other ants, has four stages of development: egg, larva, pupa, and adult. Lasius niger queens lay tiny, white, kidney-shaped eggs with a smooth sticky surface which helps them to be carried in a group instead of one by one. After hatching, Lasius niger proceeds onto the larva stage resembling tiny maggots. The larvae need to be fed by the queen (or workers in the case of an established colony) if they are to mature; as they feed, the larvae grow, shedding their skin, doing so usually three times in total. With each molt, the larvae grow hooked hairs which allow them to be carried in groups. When the larvae reach the last molt, they are generally too big to be carried as part of a group and so are carried individually. Once the larva grows big enough, it spins a cocoon around itself. To aid this process, a queen (or worker) may bury the larva so that it can spin its cocoon undisturbed, and begin a process of metamorphosis. Once the process is complete, the Lasius niger worker emerges from the cocoon. At this stage, the callow worker is completely white but will darken over the course of an hour until it has turned black.

=== Quarantine behavior ===
When building their colony, the ants structure it to inhibit the transmission of different contagions. Different communities within the colony are segregated by a limited number of connective nodes, allowing for greater protection of vulnerable hive members, such as larvae and pupae, and the queen.

Additionally, individual infected ants have been observed as spending more time foraging outside the hive, venturing farther than other ants, and limiting their interactions once within the hive again.

== Long-lived queens ==
Although worker ants live for a couple of months, queens typically survive for almost 15 years but there have been instances of queens living up to 29 years, the longest recorded lifespan for any eusocial insect. Understanding the basis for the greater longevity of queens has a bearing on the general unsolved problem in biology of the causes of aging. In the study of long-lived queen ants, it was found that queens have a higher expression than genetically identical workers of genes involved in processing damaged macromolecules. Genes with higher expression included those that are necessary for repair of DNA damage (see DNA damage theory of aging) and genes involved in proteasome-mediated, ubiquitin-dependent, protein catabolic processes.

== Mutualisms ==
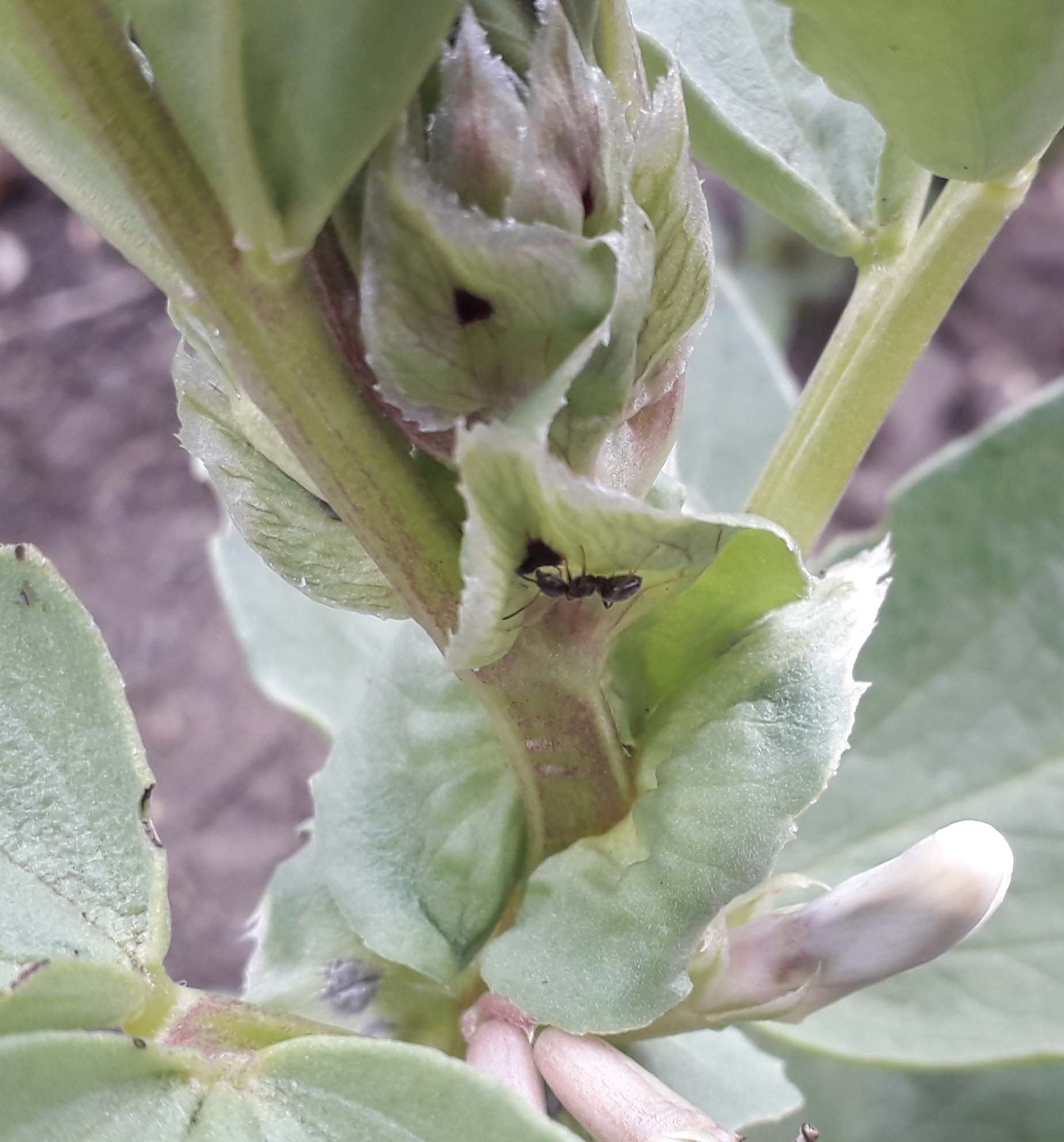
Lasius niger attending an extrafloral nectary on Vicia faba

Lasius niger removes predators, such as ladybirds, from the vicinity of black bean aphids thus keeping the aphids safe. On a test plot of field beans (Vicia faba), plants without black bean aphids yielded an average of 56 seeds per plant, those with aphids and no ants yielded 17 seeds, and those with both ants and aphids averaged eight seeds per plant. Vicia faba also produces extrafloral nectaries that Lasius niger can feed from directly.

The Plebejus argus butterfly lays eggs near nests of L. niger, forming a mutualistic relationship. This mutualistic relationship benefits the adult butterfly by reducing the need for parental investment. Once the eggs hatch, the ants chaperone the larvae, averting the attacks of predatory organisms like wasps and spiders as well as parasites. In return, the ants receive a saccharine secretion fortified with amino acids from an eversible gland on the larvae's back. As the first instar larvae prepare to pupate, the ants carry the larvae into their nests. Once the larvae become pupae, the ants continue to provide protection against predation and parasitism. The butterfly leaves the nest when it emerges in June.
