= Goetz Cave =

Fissure cave in Thuringia, Germany

- Interactive map of Goetz Cave
- Location: DE-TH
- Coordinates: 50°33′54.90″N 10°24′24.50″E
- Height variation: 33 meters
- Discovery: 1915
- Geology: Shell limestone
- Visitors: 8.400 (2006–2010)

The Goetz Cave is a fissure cave formed by a landslide around 25,000 years ago. Located on the mountain slope just west of Meiningen, Germany, this natural monument and archaeological site is the largest cave of its kind in the country and the only accessible joint and fissure cave in Europe. Originally opened as a show cave in 1934, it closed from 1970 to 2000 for renovations due to safety deficiencies, and was reopened in 2000. It was given UNESCO heritage status in 2017, and as of 2026 over 420 metres (1,380 ft) of the cave is accessible across four parallel fissures, with half of the normal tour route following artificially created tunnels across the fissures.

== History ==
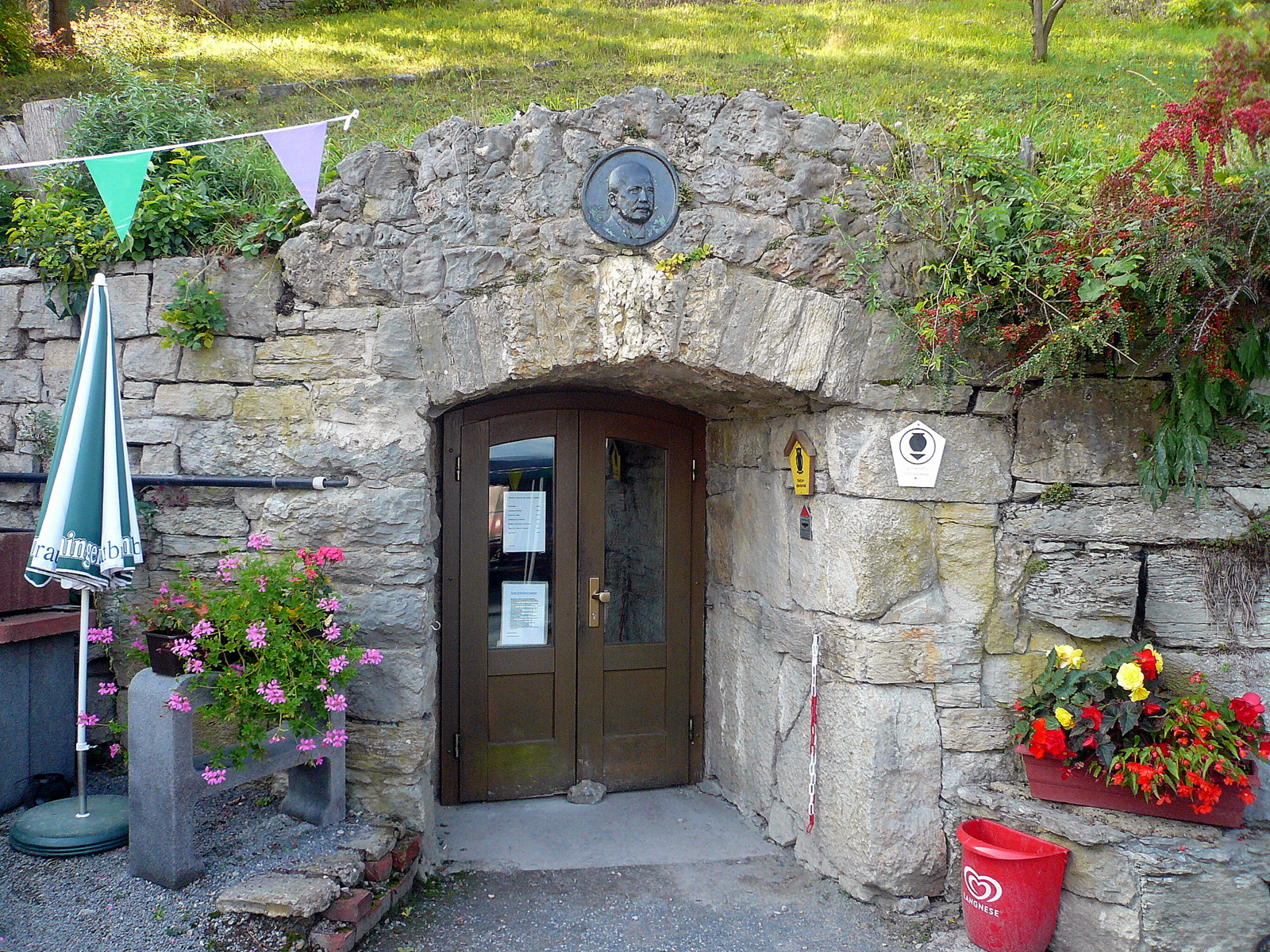
Cave entrance, above it a plaque with a portrait of Reinhold Goetz

The cave was originally discovered in 1915 by local merchant Reinhold Goetz. While mining local rocks for a nearby mountain garden, he came across a large opening in the shell limestone leading to what is now considered the main fissure 2. (Note: Nestler 2004, p.10)

=== Development ===
By 1917, a tunnel had been created there, which according to the description was the tunnel used today as an exit. In April 1917, Goetz found animal and human bones embedded in the cave clay in a crevice, today's main crevice 3, about 20 meters from the entrance. During further driving of the tunnels, the main crevices 3 and 4 were approached. The cave was first explored by the Thüringer Höhlenverein in 1922. The initial tunnel was extended until 1925. From then on, friends of the family and other interested parties visited the cave. Reinhold Goetz died on December 31, 1925 and the development work was discontinued. (Note: Nestler 2001, p.10) In the following years, the Goetz cave went quiet.

In 1932, the state geologist Heß von Wichdorf mentioned the fissures in the Dietrichsberg in Die Thüringer Höhlen. He described them as the most significant fissures in Thuringia. (Note: Nestler 2001, p.10) He had gained these insights during a visit in October 1931. On April 23, 1932, members of the Thuringian Cave Association, the mayor of Meiningen Hermann Keßler and other representatives of the city as well as cave enthusiasts from the Henneberg-Franconian History Association visited the cave. The tour was led by Heß von Wichdorf, who explained the geological conditions and the formation of the cave. He also pointed out that the development should be continued as soon as possible. (Note: Nestler 2001, p.10)

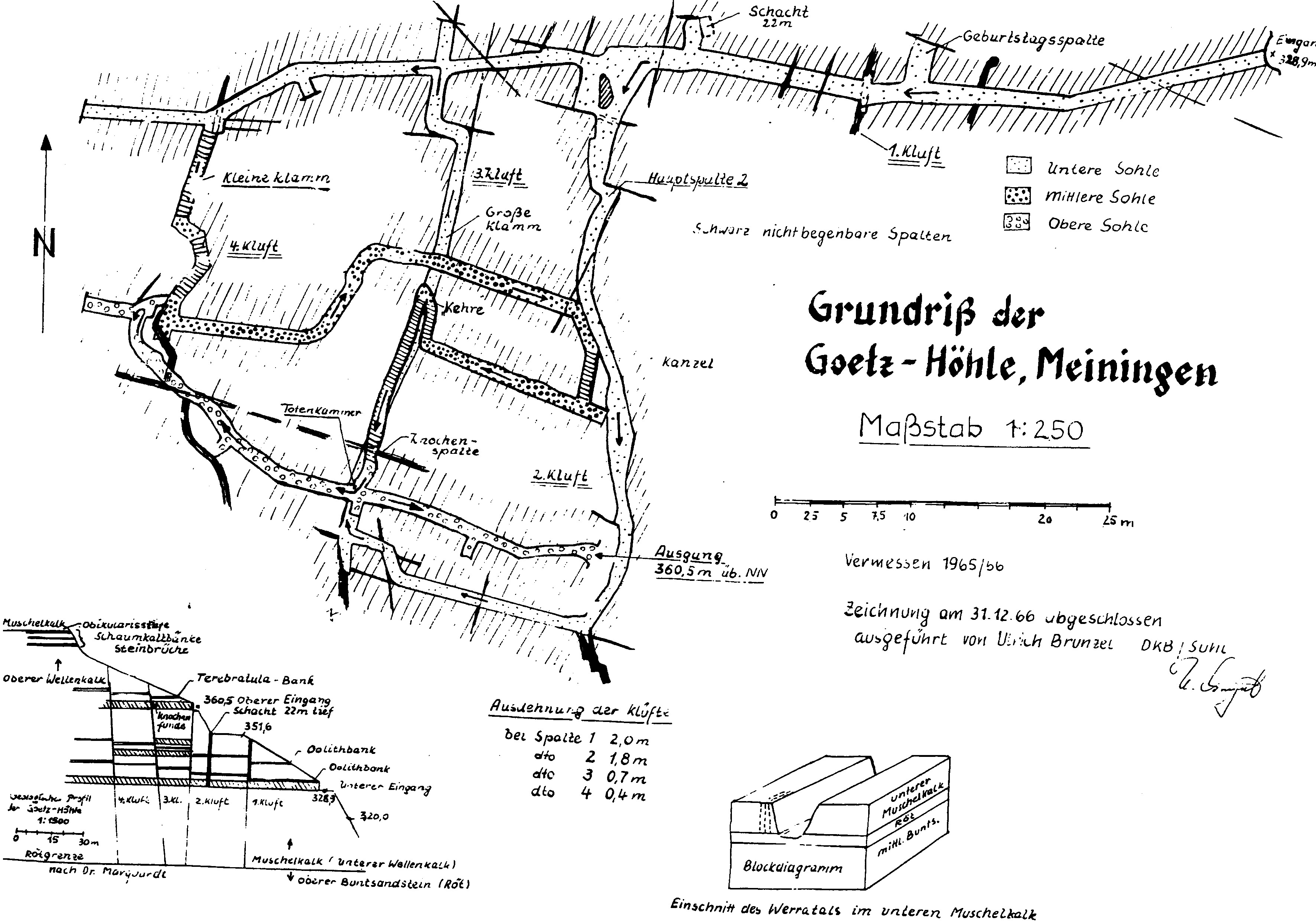
Floor plan

Further development of the cave began in May 1932. (Note: Nestler 2001, p.10) Martha Goetz, the discoverer's widow, who financed most of the further development work, was supported by the Thuringian Cave Association and the Henneberg-Franconian History Association based in Meiningen. The mining engineer Hermann Bender from Blankenburg (Harz) was the technical director, and Erich Marquardt, a teacher at Gymnasium Bernhardinum Meiningen, supported him. The work was carried out by Arbeitsdienstverpflichtete from Meiningen and the surrounding area and six workers with mining experience from the Ruhr area. (Note: Nestler 2001, p.10) In total, over 20 workers were involved in the construction under the guidance of miners and geologists.

A shaft 22 meters deep shaft was sunk to create the main access tunnel. The main fissure, today's fissure 1, and small side fissures were discovered during the expansion from the inside of the mountain to the outside. The ground-level access tunnel was of great importance for the further development of the cave. It served as access for the workers, who previously could only enter via the shaft, and for transporting the spoil from the cave, which previously had to be transported up the shaft with a hand reel. 7000 cubic meters of excavated material were heaped up to form a terrace. (Note: Nestler 2004, p.11) In March 1934, stairs made of oak wood were installed to overcome the differences in height and electric lighting was installed. This marked the end of the development work. The mayor of Meiningen, Johann Meister, officially opened the cave on April 21, 1934. (Note: Nestler 2001, p.11) The cave baude was also built at this time.

In 1938, the Breede family from Meiningen bought the cave and the mountain garden above it. They organized the cave tours in the following years. On October 30, 1940, the Goetz Cave was protected as a natural monument by a decree of the district administrator in accordance with the Reichsnaturschutzgesetz. (Note: Nestler 2001, p.14) Due to the discovery of human and animal bones, the Goetz Cave was declared a monument on August 20, 1955. In 1956, it was given temporary protection as a natural geological monument, as there was uncertainty about the validity of old district council ordinances in the GDR. (Note: Nestler 2001, p.14) In the same year, the Neumann family leased the cave.

=== Forced closure ===
The last guided tour of the cave took place on July 24, 1970. It was then closed due to the threat of the ridge collapsing.The cave lodge remained open. The owners of the cave received no official explanation for the closure, nor is there any written evidence of this. The cave entrances and exits were bricked up. It is unlikely that the safety deficiencies mentioned actually existed. The reason for the closure of the cave is thought to be its proximity to the inner German border. As the cave was privately owned, the authorities had no way of inspecting it. Neither the monument authorities nor the owners, some of whom were living in West Germany at the time, succeeded in having the closure lifted. (Note: Nestler 2001, p.11)

On August 11, 1983, the council of the district of Meiningen protected the cave as a geological natural monument with resolution number 510/73/83 (GND). (Note: Nestler 2001, p.14) The cave no longer appears in the lists of ground monuments in the district of Meiningen in 1981 and 1989, which is probably due to its closure in 1970. The cave is currently listed in the register of monuments of the Free State of Thuringia.

After reunification, the cave initially remained closed. As the 1983 decision lacked a conservation appraisal and treatment guidelines, the Lower Nature Conservation Authority of the district of Meiningen commissioned a conservation appraisal at the beginning of the 1990s. The Thuringian State Office for the Preservation of Monuments and Archaeology (TLAD) in Weimar began reprocessing the archaeological finds in 1994. In December 1995, nine committed people from Meiningen took the initiative to reopen the site. The 1996 report by a mining safety company from Ilfeld did not reveal any safety risks, meaning that the cave could have been reopened to the public at any time. The owners, a community of heirs of several families and individuals, signaled their intention to sell.

=== Reopening ===
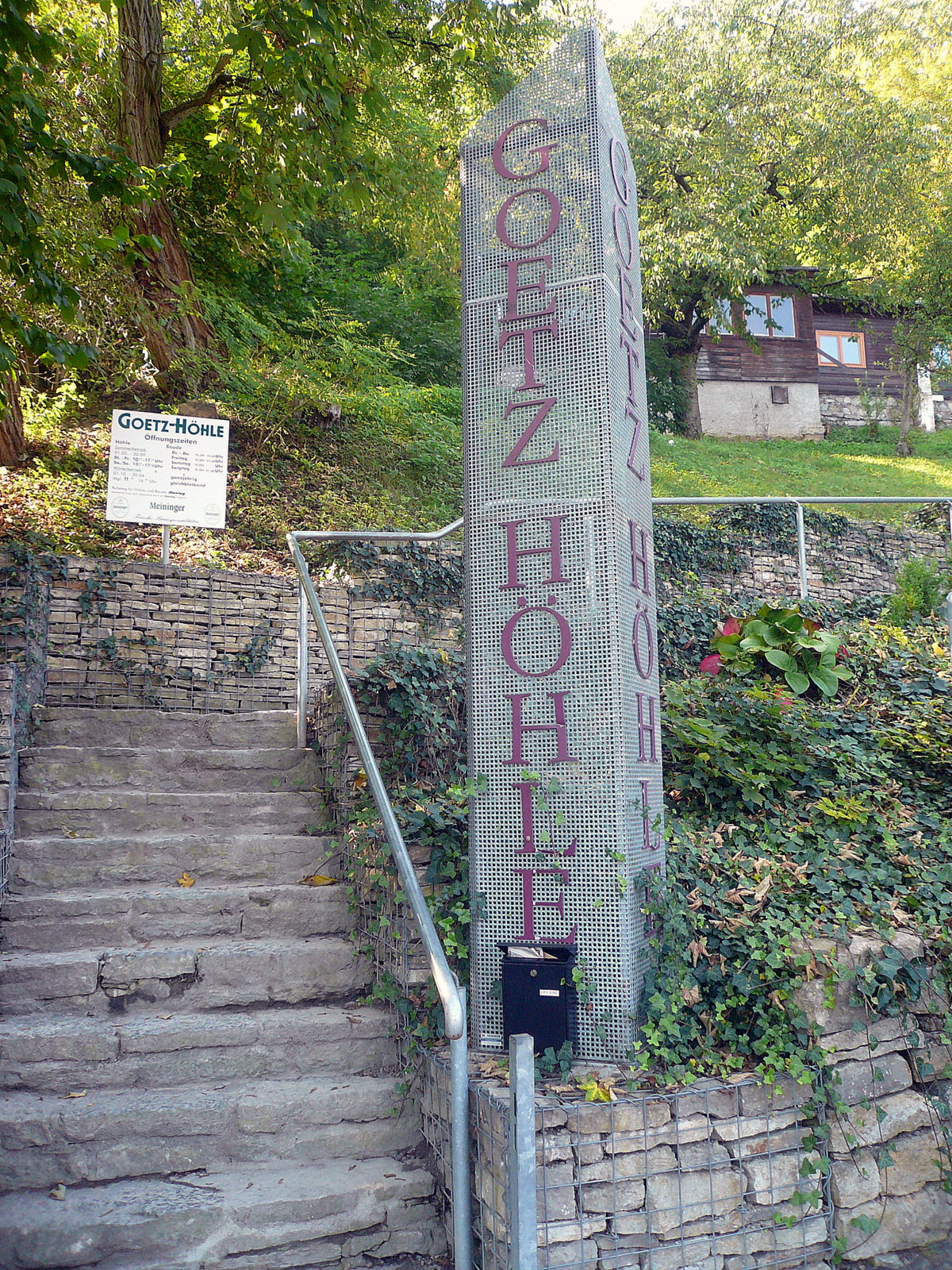
Cave entrance

An eight-page report by Bergsicherung Ilfeld from March 1, 1996 on the technical condition of the cave and the necessary renovation work and investments came to the conclusion that nothing stood in the way of reopening the Goetz Cave. On 13 September 1996, the association Goetz-Höhle e. V. was founded with 42 members. (Note: Nestler 2001, p.12) German mining law stipulates that an underground show cave may only be used if the owner of the land above it agrees. The surface area of the Goetz cave, which was also owned by the community of heirs, is around 21,000 square meters. The property with the Goetz cave was acquired by notarial deed dated April 26, 1996. Bergsicherung Ilfeld estimated the cost of the renovation measures at around €1.6 million. (Note: Nestler 2001, p.11-12)

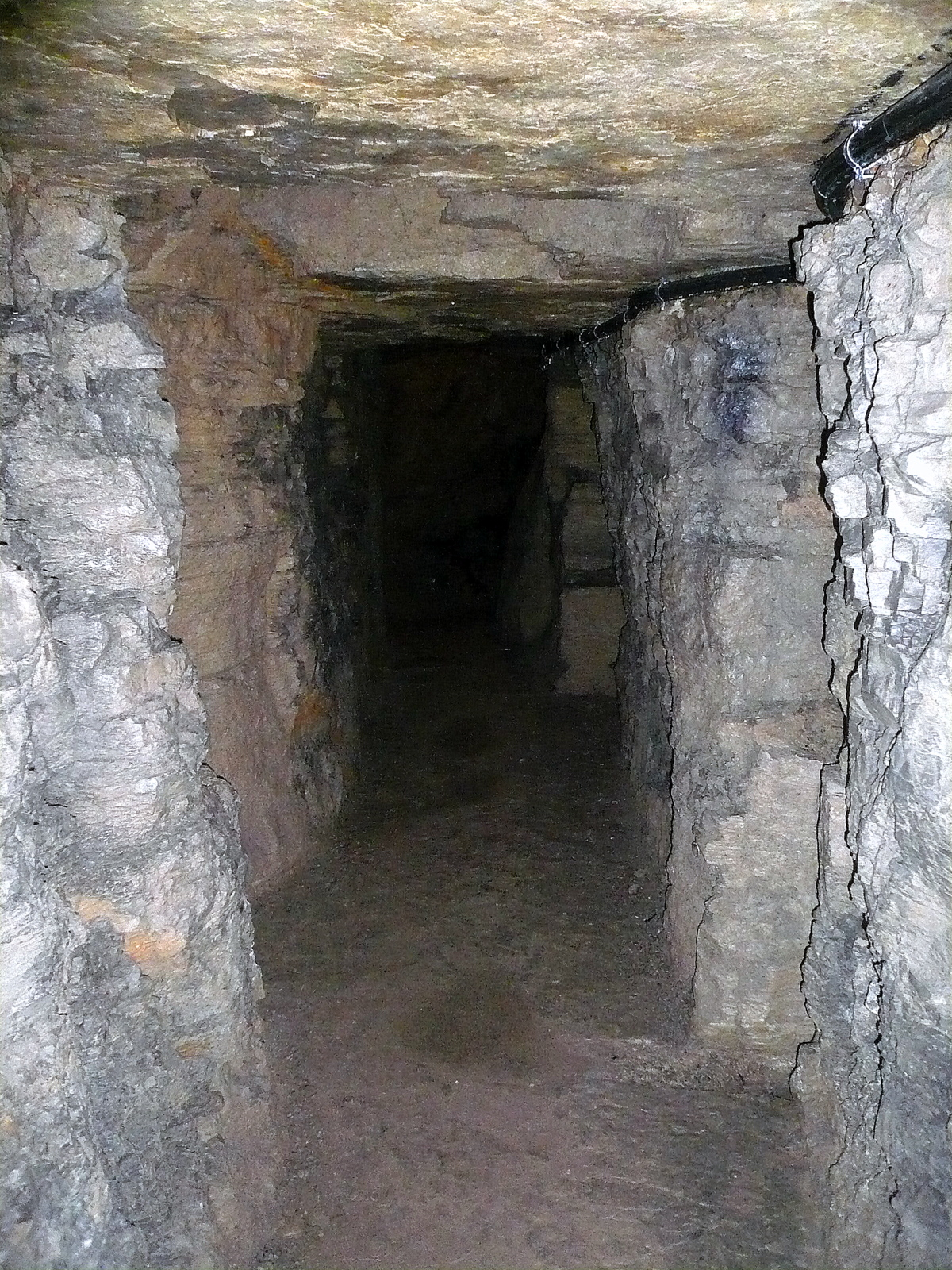
Aisle

In order to keep the subsequent entrance fees as low as possible, funding was sought to finance the development costs. However, a commitment from the Ministry of Economic Affairs in Erfurt was revoked due to a budget freeze. The state employment office later contributed around one million euros to the financing of the first expansion stage. The Thuringian State Office for the Preservation of Monuments and Archaeology in Weimar, the town of Meiningen and several business people and private individuals also contributed. From June 1999 to January 2000, all measures for the opening of the show cave were completed. (Note: Nestler 2001, p.13)

The main and exploratory plan of the responsible mining office Bad Salzungen from 1999 provided for the replacement of all technical facilities, as these had not been maintained during the almost thirty-year dormant phase. In addition, it was necessary to professionally secure the parts of the cave intended for future use as a visitor route and the necessary side routes. The entrance, which had been used as a beer cellar for decades, had to be returned to its original purpose, and the old wooden stairs and lighting systems had to be replaced. Support elements, wire nets to prevent falling rocks and railings in the area of deep crevices were installed to ensure safe visitor traffic, and the outside area of the cave, such as paths, stairs and embankments, were made visitor-friendly. (Note: Nestler 2001, p.26-27)

The Thüringer Höhlenverein e. V. supported the work of the Goetz-Höhlen-Verein. At the beginning of 2000, the cave and the adjoining cave hut were leased. The first trial operation of the cave took place on February 19, the festive reopening on Holy Saturday, April 22, 2000. By the end of the year, 14,554 visitors had been counted in the show cave. (Note: Nestler 2001, p.14)

=== Cave operation ===
In 2009, effect lighting with light-emitting diodes (LED) was installed to illuminate individual parts of the cave in different colors. The new lighting cost around 25,000 euros. The first cave festival took place in September 2009. A second expansion stage of the cave is planned. The construction of a new entrance structure is absolutely necessary, as the old cave lodge no longer meets today's requirements. (Note: Nestler 2001, p.14) From 2012, the cave was rarely open to the public due to the closure of the lodge, until new tenants reopened the cave and lodge in May 2014. They also made the romantic mountain garden created by Goetz accessible again. Two years later, they gave up the business again and the cave and restaurant remained closed. Guided tours of the cave were only possible by appointment. Since then, the cave has been for sale.

In February 2020, the Goetz Cave Association sold the cave and building to the entrepreneur and brewery owner Volker Reich. Following a positive safety assessment by the responsible State Office for the Environment, Mining and Nature Conservation, he intends to carry out extensive renovations to the site. Together with the town, the new owner wants to create a "world of cave experiences" with attractions for children and better marketing and accessibility for visitors. The reopening of the Goetz Cave and the "Zur Spalte" lodge took place on July 3, 2021.

== Geology ==
=== Origin ===
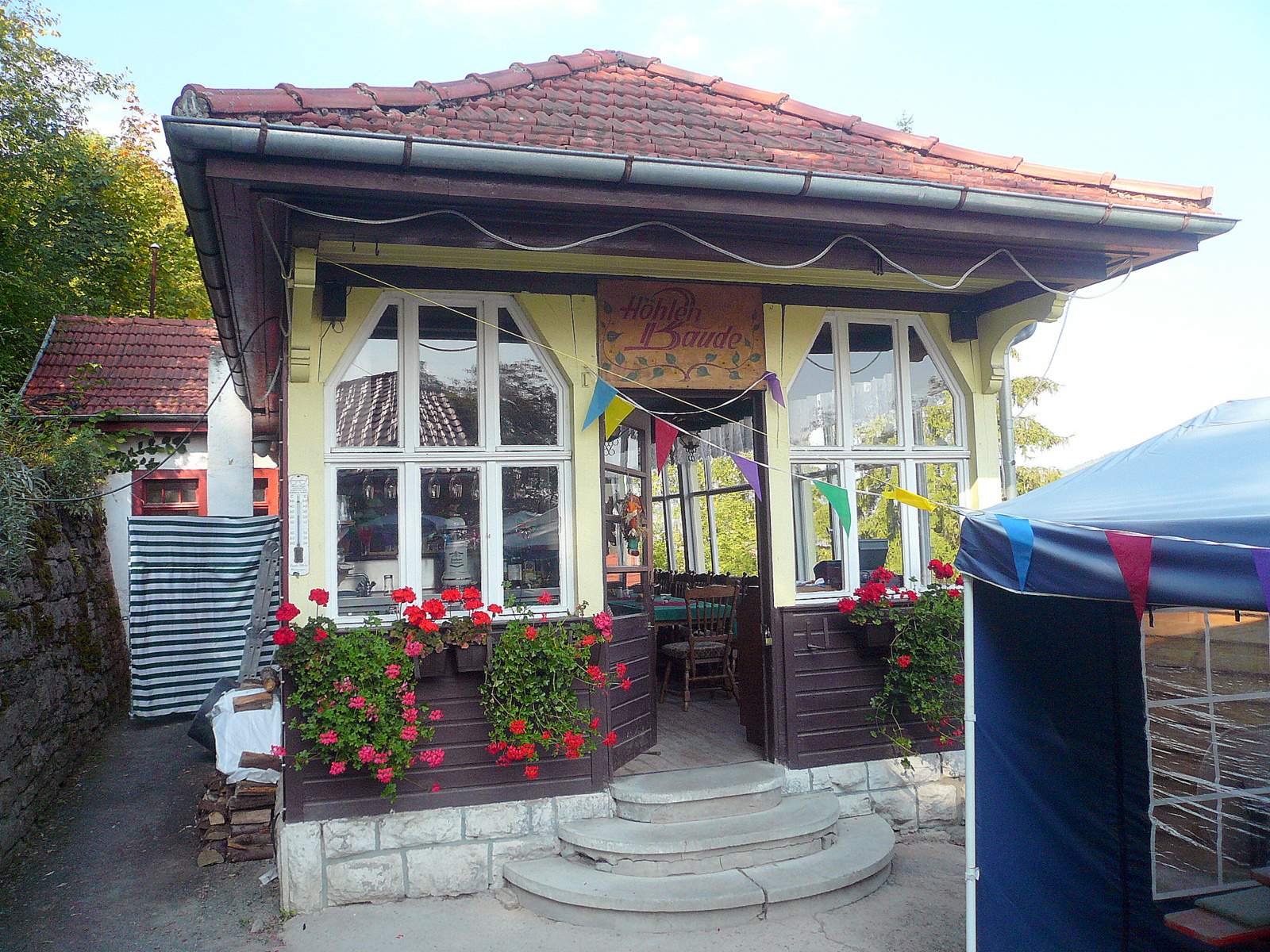
Cave lodge

The abyssal fissure cave runs through Lower Muschelkalk rocks. (Note: Pustal 2005, p.92) Geologically, the cave can be assigned to the southern Thuringian-Franconian Scholle, the Heldburger Scholle and part of the Meininger Mulde. (Note: Nestler 2001, p.14) It is located in the so-called Meininger Triassic Land, also known as the Meininger Kalkplatten, an extensive shell limestone plateau between the Werra valley near Meiningen and the Grabfeld. This type of cave is particularly common in Thuringia in the valleys of the Werra and Ilm rivers; around 150 of them are known, the Goetz Cave being the largest. The undeveloped Enzianerdfall near Arnstadt has a similarly large fissure with a depth of 56 meters. (Note: Pustal 2005, p.55)

The formation of the cave can be attributed to several causes. Well-fissured limestone and limestone marl of the Lower Muschelkalk overlie the relatively impermeable Upper Buntsandstein (Röt), which is predominantly clayey-silty. (Note: Pustal 2005, p.92) In addition, the formation of the Werra Valley in the Pleistocene led to an erosive incision of the shell limestone base. 34 meters below the level of the entrance tunnel of the cave lies the upper edge of the red. (Note: Pustal 2005, p.96) The seeping water from precipitation and the groundwater accumulate at the shell limestone base, which is followed by reddish rock in the bedrock, and soften it.

The load of the approximately 100 meter thick limestone package of the Lower Muschelkalk caused fracturing and sliding processes in the rocks of the Röt in the area of the Goetz Cave. As a result, the large limestone rock masses broke off towards the valley and tilted. The sliding rock package of the Lower Muschelkalk broke up into individual clods and mainly slope-parallel fissures formed. Layer inclinations of only one degree in the direction of the valley supported this process, which is indicated by slope-parallel trench-like dips on the surface of the terrain. On the slope of the Dietrichsberg, the individual blocks tilted in front of and next to each other in an echelon. This resulted in four main and twenty secondary clefts parallel to the slope. (Note: Pustal 2005, p.94) The blocks furthest down the valley slipped the most. In the Goetz Cave, the horizontal sliding movement was greater than the vertical displacement.

=== Description ===
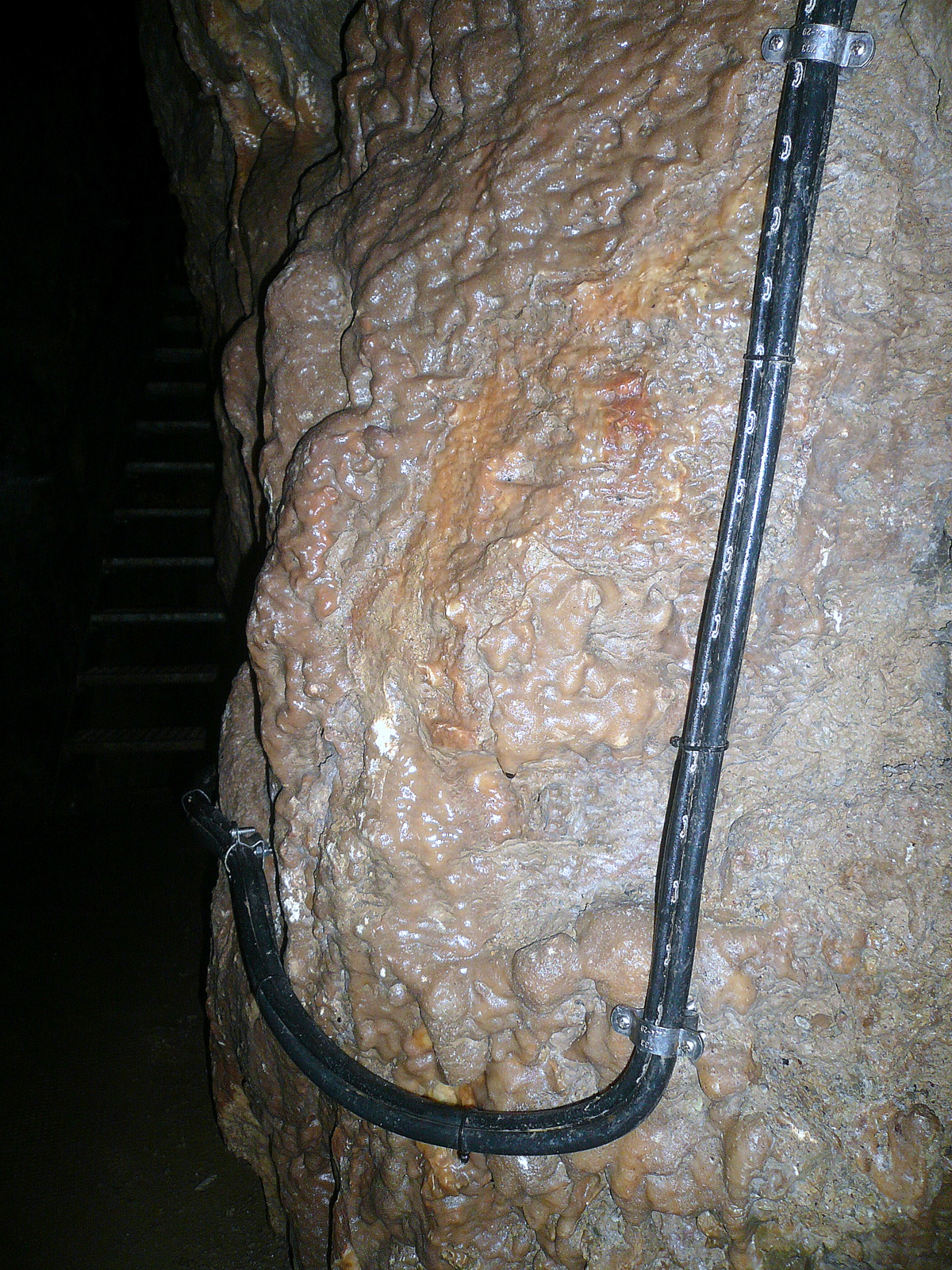
Sintered wall section

The cave entrance is at an altitude of 328 and the cave exit at 361 meters above sea level. The valley of the Werra lies at about 290 meters above sea level and is cut into the surrounding terrain about 160 meters deep in the Meiningen area. The cave has four parallel main fissures, some of which reach a height of over 50 meters, are closed at the top and are the widest at the bottom with a width of up to three meters. Column 1, also known as the Birthday Column because it was discovered on the birthday of the explorer Goetz, is walled up at both ends for safety reasons. The fissure is about twelve meters long from wall to wall, three meters wide and nine meters high. The fissure 2 is about 40 meters long and one to two and a half meters wide due to fissure jumps. The height is around 30 meters, with 20 to 25 meters visible. Gorge 3, also known as the "Great Gorge", is 50 meters high and over 40 meters long. It was originally around 65 meters high; to make it accessible, the floor was filled in by 15 meters. Gorge 4, known as the "Little Gorge", is between 30 and 45 meters high and just under 10 meters long.

The four fissures are partially accessible in three levels, with 33 meters in height with seven stairs and 164 steps to overcome. The fissures are accessed by several crosscuts on all three levels, the entrance tunnel has a length of 110 meters. Other caves of this type, which are not accessible, can only be entered by cave explorers via shafts leading vertically into the depths. The tour route is about 420 meters (according to other information also 450, 464 and 480 meters) and about half of it goes over natural crevices and artificially created tunnel passages, so-called crosscuts. In the middle level, a fissure running from west to east was used as a crosscut.

=== Guide way ===
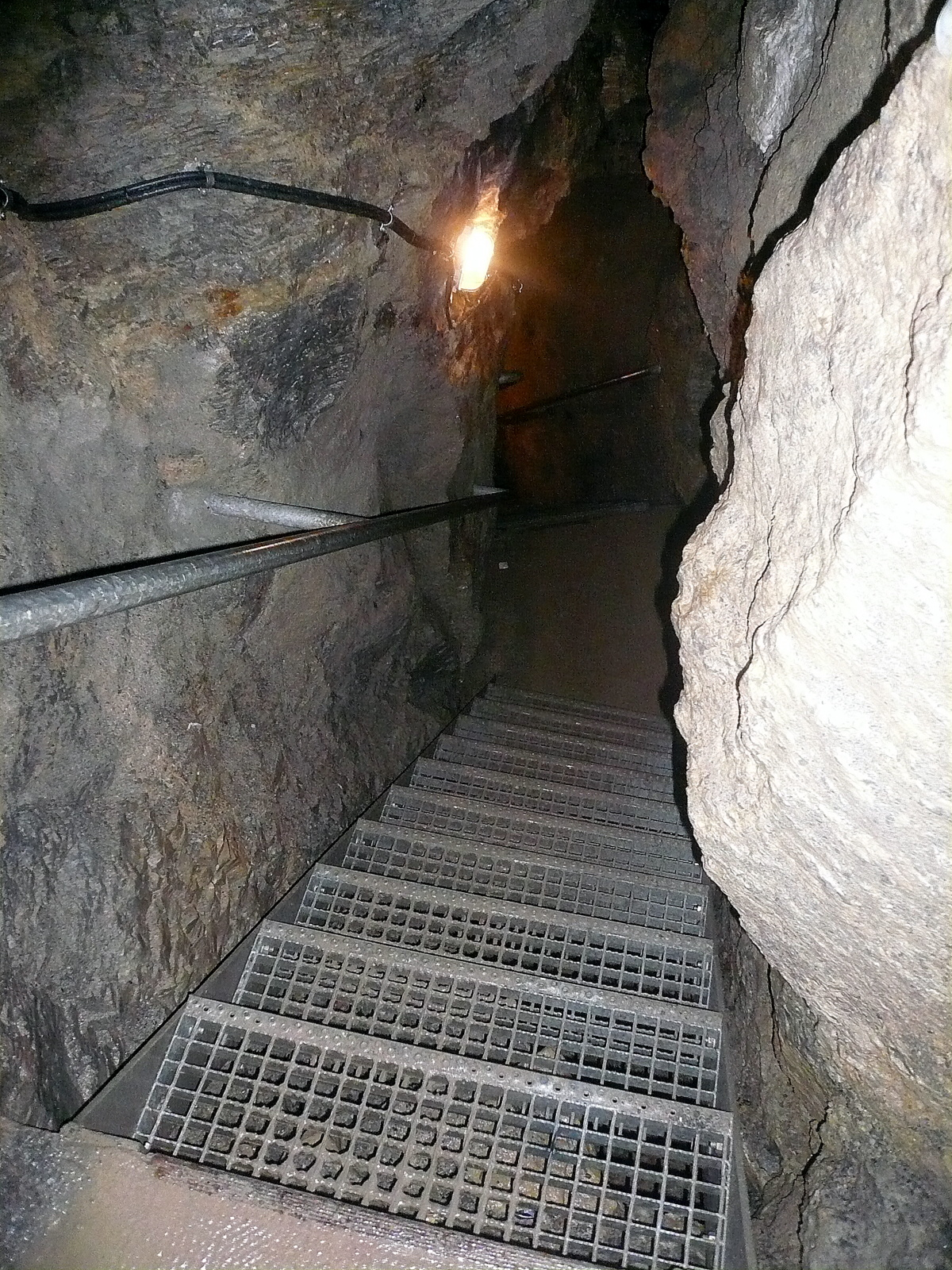
Staircase

In the entrance tunnel, the front part of which is made of limestone masonry, two doors lead into the cave. On the way to fissure 1, the first natural fissure opening is located behind the first bend in the lower right wall area. The fissure extends about five meters in a north-northeasterly direction. The fissure 1, the first of four main fissures that can be seen during the tour, is then reached. After four meters follows a high crevice, the chimney. This natural cavity is 15 meters long, up to 1.5 meters wide and up to 15 meters high. From the chimney, the walls of the passageway are walled over a length of 16 meters. Here, heavily fractured rock and several fissures were encountered when driving the adit. At the next fork in the path uphill, continue straight on to fissures 3 and 4, but the guide path turns left, following fissure 2. There you will find the Little Dome, a rock cave where bats hibernate. There are numerous brick struts in the crevice from the time of development, which are intended to prevent loose blocks from sliding down. The mountain-side and valley-side wall sections of the crevice are at different levels. The rock packages on the valley side have slid further downhill than those on the slope side. As a result, the originally horizontalal layers were offset against each other in a staggered manner. The fissure becomes wider and wider as the path progresses and finally reaches a width of three meters. The visible height is about 20 to 25 meters. (Note: Nestler 2004, p.17-19)

Further along the fissure, the large dome is reached, the largest fissure area of the cave. Because of the good acoustics music is played over loudspeakers. The rear part of the fissure is closed off. This ten-metre-long area is called the Gnome Grotto because, with a little imagination, various fairy-tale figures and other shapes can be recognized there. Before the closed-off area, turn right into a cross-passage. Like the entrance tunnel, this was created during development. It runs past several crevices until you reach the Große Klamm in crevice 3 at the end of the cross-passage. This crevasse begins quite narrow and then widens. At a height of over 30 meters, it is not completely visible. Here, too, an offset can be observed on the mountain- and valley-side wall sections. At two meters, this fissure has the largest fissure jump in the cave. After the fissure jump, the entrance tunnel is reached again. Wheelchair users can get out there. The large circular route leads to the left over the entrance tunnel into the mountain, where further fissures are approached. From fissure 4, a staircase leads up twelve meters to the middle floor. The entrance tunnel extends a further nine meters into the mountain. This section was used as a search tunnel for further fissures, but none were discovered. The staircase leads past a plateau and continues upwards via a second staircase. (Note: Nestler 2004, p.19-21)

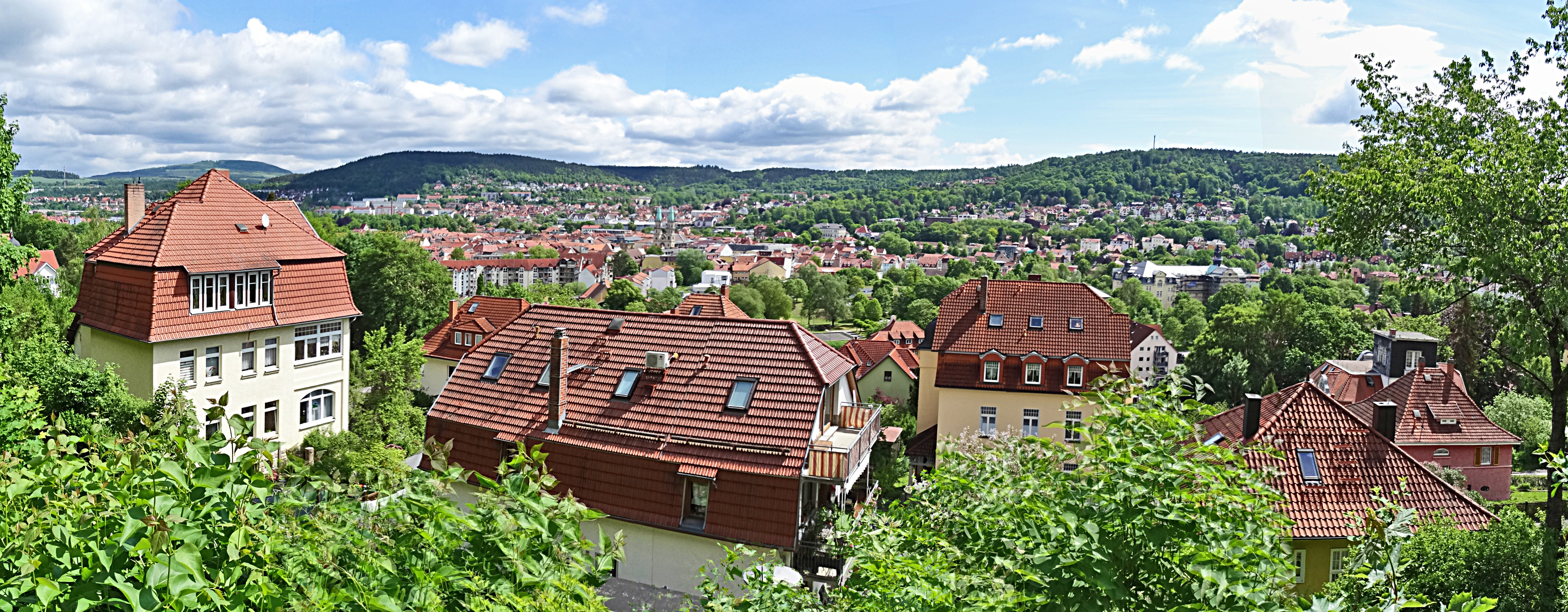
View of Meiningen from the cave exit

The path leads from cleft 4 through a section to the east and meets the large gorge of cleft 3 again. From a bridge you can see twelve meters freely downwards. Two more flights of stairs at the bend lead to the upper level, where you will reach fissure 2. From there you can see the rock cave in the depths. On the way to the chapel, you pass a fissure jump. A six-metre-high staircase in the chapel leads to the pulpit. In a westerly direction, you return to the Great Gorge of fissure 3 through another cross-cut. A staircase leads to an artificially created plateau, called a hairpin bend. The first stalactite formation in the form of wall sinter can be seen there. Further along the path, the walls of the crevice are extensively sintered. Two more staircases, the last ones in the cave, lead up another 13 meters to the upper level. (Note: Nestler 2004, p.21-22) The exit tunnel is on the left, while the guide path to the "Totenkopfspalte" continues on the right. The path leads through another section of the tunnel, which, however, has not been mined exactly and has a varying width. Human skeletal remains have been found in the Totenkopfspalte, a fissure with a different direction to the other fissures. Until it was closed in 1970, visitors were shown an illuminated skull. Afterwards, a short section of the tunnel, slightly ascending, with crevices leading up to the end point of the upper level, is walked through. The tunnel leads back towards the cave exit. After crossing the large gorge, a third short side tunnel branches off to the southwest a few meters before the exit. This is where Goetz quarried material for his mountain garden above the cave, which ultimately led to the discovery of the cave. From this side tunnel, the route led uphill to the current exit tunnel, from which the cave was developed. Outside the cave, the large spoil heap and the terrace can be seen on the left, which bear witness to the development work. (Note: Nestler 2004, p.22-23)

== Flora and fauna ==
=== Animal world ===
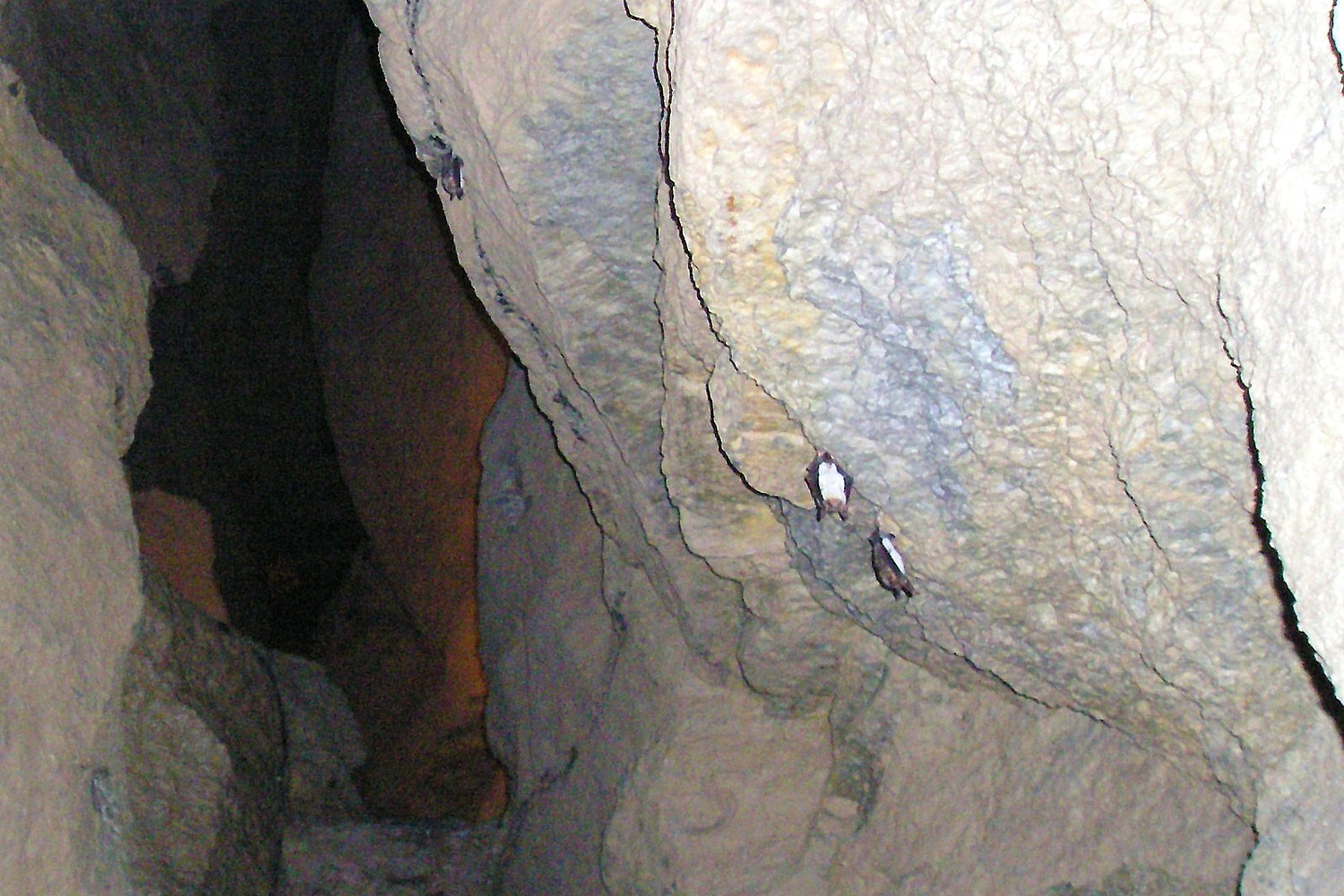
Hanging bats in a crevice

The fauna of the cave has already been explored several times. Inspections by Zaenker took place on October 4, 1996, May 14, 1999, and April 22, 2000, and by Bellstedt on January 14 and 28, 2001. (Note: Nestler 2001, p.31-33) A distinction is made between three groups of animals. The cave-alien animals get into the cave by chance because they get lost there. They soon perish, as the cave is not their actual habitat. Another group are the cave friends (troglophiless), which spend their entire lives in the cave. However, they can also exist in the outside world. The third group are called troglobionts and have developed characteristics in the course of evolution characteristics that enable them to live permanently in the cave. Animals from all three groups have been found in Goetz Cave. (Note: Nestler 2004, p.28-29)

In small pools of water at the back of the cave there are small, usually only up to one millimeter in size, white and eyeless springtails (Collembola), which belong to the troglobionts. The Goetz Cave is the only cave in the Thuringian region that is home to the rare millipede Brachychaeteuma bagnalli. Troglophilic cave animals include the cellar glass-snail (Oxychilus cellarius) and the common woodlouse (Oniscus asellus). Noteworthy are the six species of arachnids, including the troglophilic spider species Lepthyphantes pallidus and Nesticus cellulanus. The canopy spider (L. pallidus) has a body size of only two millimeters. Hygrophilous (moisture-loving) are the cave spider Nesticus cellulanus and the Metellina merianae. In the upper cave entrance, two funnel-web spiders, the house spider Tegenaria atrica and Tegenaria silvestris, can be found in drier wall areas. (Note: Nestler 2001, p.31-33)

In summer, the long-legged short-palped cranefly (Limonia nubeculosa) lives in the entrance area of the cave. In winter, the females of mosquito Culex pipiens regularly overwinter in the cave. There are also fungus gnats (Mycetophilidae and Sciaridae) and winter crane flies (Trichoceridae), more rarely the sink flies (Psychodidae). Small black flies from the Sphaeroceridae family (dung flies) spend the summer in the damp entrance area. The glassy, transparent and eyeless larvae of a specially adapted species of fungus gnat can be found in some damp areas of the cave ceiling. Humpback flies (Phoridae) and the troglophile Triphleba antricola live in the cave all year round. Two butterfly species, the tissue (Triphosa dubitata) and the herald (Scoliopteryx libatrix), are typical cave hibernators. (Note: Nestler 2001, p.31-33)

Several bat species have been detected in the cave, most of which fly into the upper exit tunnel, where their activities are detected by radar sensors. The bats hibernate in the cave from October to March and are among the most highly developed cave dwellers. The Great mouse-eared bat (Myotis myotis), the Brown long-eared bat (Plecotus auritus) and the whiskered bat (Myotis mystacinus) can be determined. These are usually found at great heights in crevices or in hidden corners and niches and are usually barely visible. (Note: Nestler 2001, p.31-33)

=== Lamp flora ===
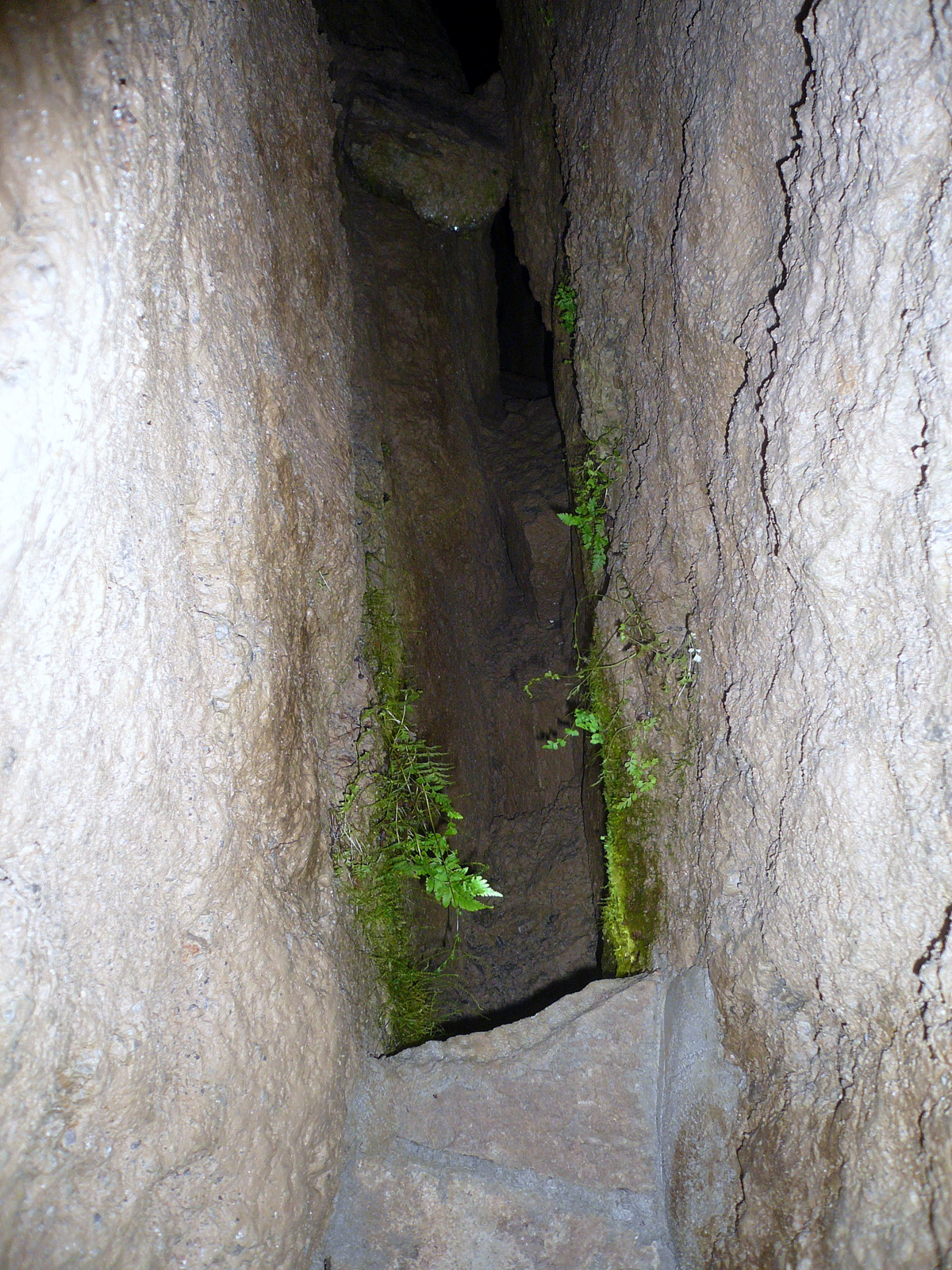
Lamp flora in a column

Since the reopening of the Goetz Cave in 2000, a distinct plant community known as lamp flora has developed in the light of the lamps. In particular algaes, mosses and ferns can colonize in the light. However, most of these plants are seedlings that could not survive in absolute darkness without artificial lighting. The plants are not evenly distributed; chance determines which spores enter the cave with the seepage water from the earth's surface through fissures. Cave visitors also contribute to the distribution of the plants. With decreasing distance from the light source, i.e. with increasing light intensity and heat radiation, the green zone gradually turns into a moss belt. In some lamps, no or only a small amount of lamp flora could develop due to the dryness. (Note: Nestler 2004, p.17)

=== Archaeological finds ===
Goetz had already made finds in the cave during the exploration work in the 1910s. Further objects were found during further exploration work by his widow from 1932 to 1934. Some of these were initially exhibited in two showcases at the opening of the cave in 1934. In 1958, some of the finds were transferred to the Meiningen Prehistory Collection. The collection from the Meiningen museum is now in the Steinsburg Museum near Römhild. The contents of the display cases are in the possession of the Thuringian State Office for the Preservation of Monuments and Archaeology (TLAD) in Weimar. (Note: Nestler 2004, p.22-23)

Most of the finds come from the bone fissure. They include the bones of eight human skeletons, bones and teeth of brown bears, European badgers, bisons, moless, voless and red squirrels. Ceramic potsherds or remains of clothing were not found. (Note: Völkel 2007, p.57)

== Tourism ==
The cave can be reached via the Bundesstraße 19 through Meiningen and from the Meiningen-Nord and -Süd junctions of the A 71. Next to the cave is the cave inn "Zur Spalte" with restaurants, a toilet facility and the ticket office with information about the cave. After being closed for many months, the cave and cave lodge were reopened on July 3, 2021, following extensive renovations.

The guided tours take you into the individual crevices via easily accessible paths and stairs. A tour lasts around 45 minutes. A distance of approximately 480 meters is covered, three levels with a height difference of about 33 meters are overcome on 164 steps. The temperature in the cave is constantly around eight degrees Celsius with a humidity of over 80 percent. A path with steps leads from the cave exit back to the cave lodge. In addition to the normal tour, a ground-level tour is also offered to make the cave accessible to people with limited mobility. Special tours are the "scary tour" for adults and the "fairytale tour" for children. In the years 2006 to 2010, there was an annual average of 8376 visitors.

== Literature ==
- Stephan Kempe, Wilfried Rosendahl (2008), Höhlen – Verborgene Welten, Stuttgart: Primus Verlag, ISBN 978-3-89678-611-1
- Goetz-Höhle Meiningen e. V., ed. (2000), Goetz-Höhle Meiningen – Deutschlands größte begehbare Kluft- und Spalthöhle, Meiningen: Resch Druck GmpH
- Erich Marquardt (1937), Städtisches Verkehrsamt Meiningen (ed.), "Die Goetzhöhle in Meiningen", Theaterstadt Meiningen und Umgebung, Stuttgart: Primus Verlag
- Erich Marquardt, ed. (1935), Die Goetzhöhle zu Meiningen – Ein Führer für die Besucher und Freunde, Meiningen: Reußnersche Hofbuchdruckerei GmbH Meiningen/Thür.
- A. A. (1935), Goetz-Höhle Meiningen – Einzige Klufthöhle Deutschlands, Meiningen: Reich’s Druckanstalt
