= Abaristophora tonnoiri =

Scientific classification
- Domain: Eukaryota
- Kingdom: Animalia
- Phylum: Arthropoda
- Class: Insecta
- Order: Diptera
- Family: Phoridae
- Subfamily: Phorinae
- Genus: Abaristophora
- Species: A. tonnoiri

Binomial name
- Abaristophora tonnoiri (Schmitz, 1939)

Species of fly

Abaristophora tonnoiri is a species of fly discovered by Schmitz in 1939. No sub-species specified in Catalogue of Life and listed as Antipodiphora tonnoiri in Systema Dipterorum.
