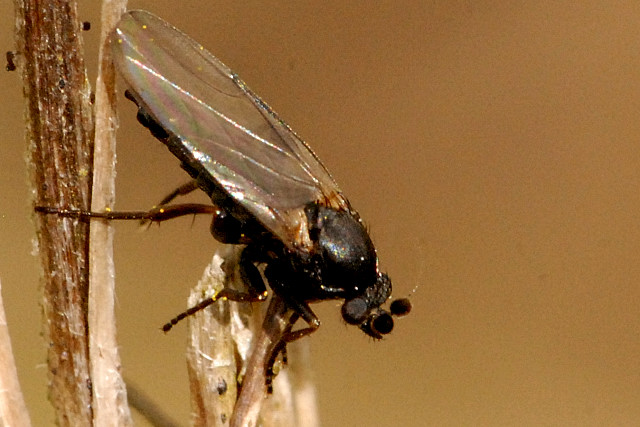

Scientific classification
- Kingdom: Animalia
- Phylum: Arthropoda
- Clade: Pancrustacea
- Class: Insecta
- Order: Diptera
- Family: Phoridae
- Subfamily: Phorinae
- Genus: Anevrina; Lioy, 1864

Type species
- Phora urbana Meigen, 1830

Synonyms
- Aneurina Scudder, 1882 nec Hebard, 1935; Chaetoneura Malloch, 1909 nec Labbé 1899 nec Felder, 1862; Chaetoneurophora Malloch, 1912; Stenophora Malloch, 1909; Pseudostenophora Malloch, 1912

= Anevrina =

Genus of flies

Anevrina is a genus of phorid flies circumscribed by the Italian naturalist Paolo Lioy in 1864.

== Species ==
A 2010 paper by the entomologists Paul T. Smith and Brian V. Brown recognized the following extant species:

- A. capillata Michailovskaya, 1999
- A. curvinervis (Becker, 1901)
- A. glabrata Liu & Zhu, 2006
- A. kozaneki Brown, 1995
- A. luggeri (Aldrich, 1892)
- A. macateei (Malloch, 1913)
- A. olympiae (Aldrich, 1904)
- A. neotropica Smith & Brown, 2010
- A. sphaeropyge Beyer, 1958
- A. thoracica (Meigen, 1830)
- A. unispinosa (Zetterstedt, 1860)
- A. urbana (Meigen, 1830)
- A. variabilis (Brues, 1908)
- A. wyatti Disney, 2006

As of 2018, Fossilworks recognizes the following fossil species:

- †A. huberti Prokop & Nel, 2005
- †A. oligocaenica (Brues, 1939)
- †A. shoumayae Brown, 2013
