= Canariphantes =

Scientific classification
- Kingdom: Animalia
- Phylum: Arthropoda
- Subphylum: Chelicerata
- Class: Arachnida
- Order: Araneae
- Infraorder: Araneomorphae
- Family: Linyphiidae
- Genus: Canariphantes; Wunderlich, 1992

Type species
- C. alpicola Wunderlich, 1992

Species
- 11, see text

Genus of spiders

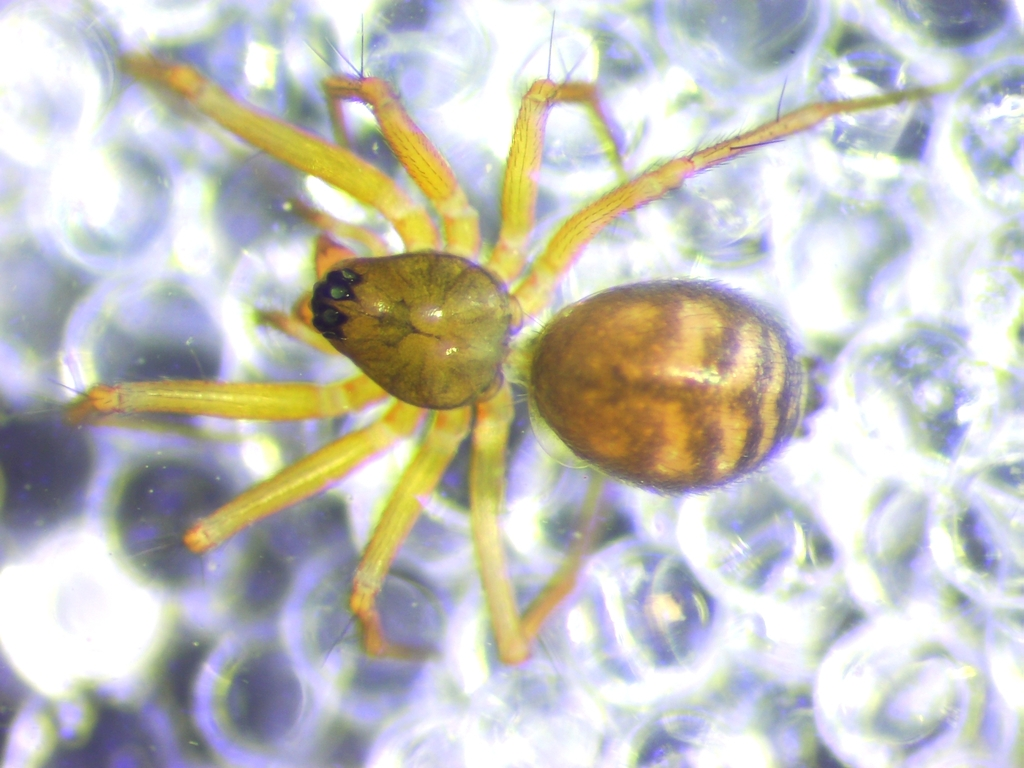
Canariphantes zonatus

Canariphantes is a genus of dwarf spiders that was first described by J. Wunderlich in 1992. It might be a junior synonym of Lepthyphantes.

== Species ==
As of May 2019 it contains thirteen species and one subspecies:

- Canariphantes acoreensis (Wunderlich, 1992) – Azores
- Canariphantes alpicola Wunderlich, 1992 (type) – Canary Is.
- Canariphantes atlassahariensis (Bosmans, 1991) – Algeria
- Canariphantes barrientosi Bosmans, 2019 – Spain (Balearic Is.)
- Canariphantes epigynatus Tanasevitch, 2013 – Israel
- Canariphantes junipericola Crespo & Bosmans, 2014 – Azores
- Canariphantes naili (Bosmans & Bouragba, 1992) – Algeria
- Canariphantes nanus (Kulczyński, 1898) – Central to eastern Europe, Israel
- Canariphantes palmaensis Wunderlich, 2011 – Canary Is.
- Canariphantes relictus Crespo & Bosmans, 2014 – Azores
- Canariphantes ritae (Bosmans, 1985) – Spain, Morocco, Algeria, Tunisia
- Canariphantes tenerrimus (Simon, 1929) – Portugal, Spain, France, Greece, Algeria, Morocco
- Canariphantes zonatus (Simon, 1884) – Portugal, France, Sardinia, Algeria, Morocco, Tunisia
  - Canariphantes z. lucifugus (Simon, 1929) – France
