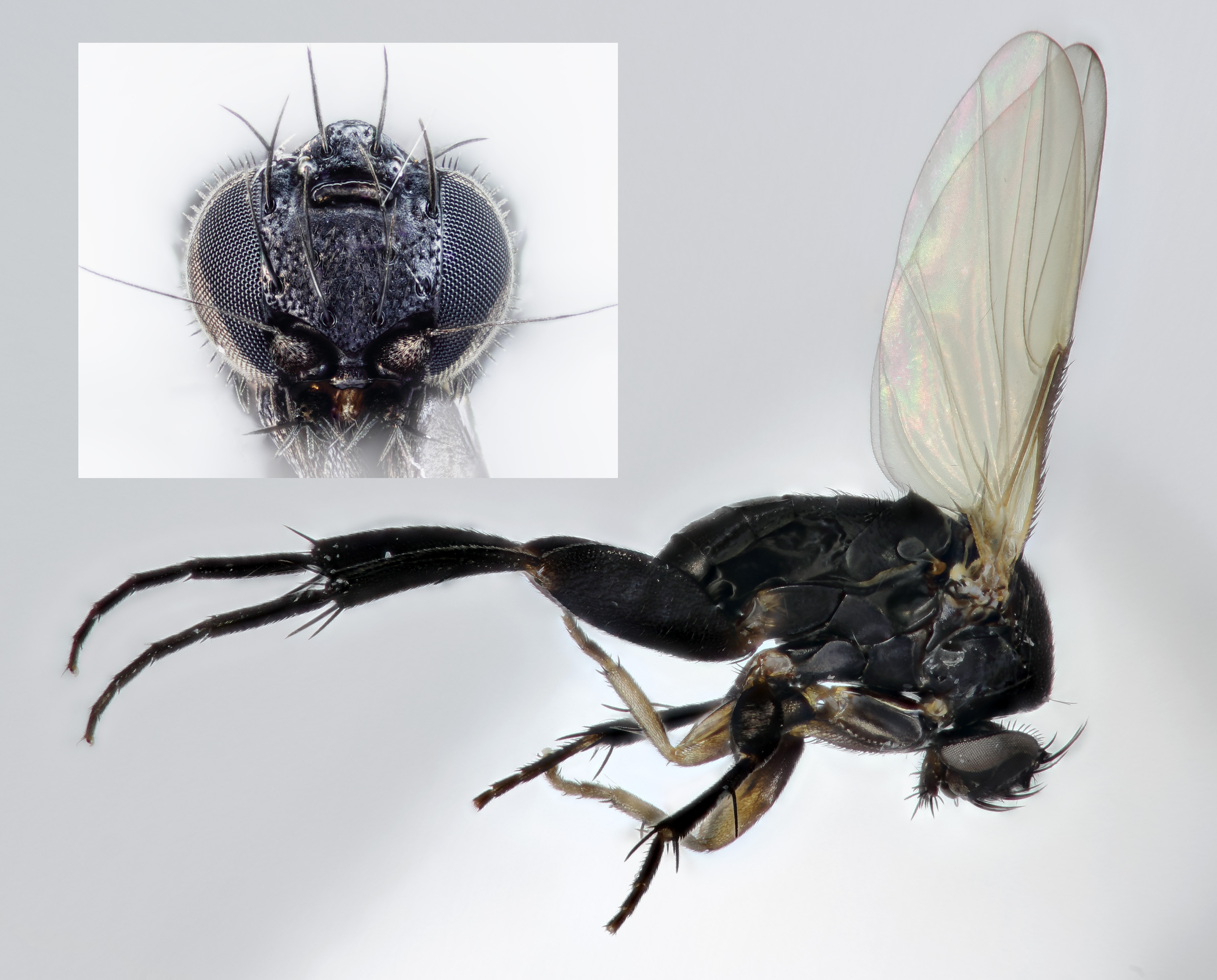

Scientific classification
- Kingdom: Animalia
- Phylum: Arthropoda
- Class: Insecta
- Order: Diptera
- Family: Phoridae
- Subfamily: Phorinae
- Genus: Borophaga; Enderlein, 1924

Synonyms
- Borgmeierella Enderlein, 1924; Latiborophaga Brown, 1992; Trichostiria Enderlein, 1924

= Borophaga =

Genus of flies

Borophaga is a genus of phorid flies.

== Species ==
- B. femorata (Meigen, 1830)
- B. flavimana (Meigen, 1830)
- B. fuscicornis Borgmeier, 1968
- B. fuscipalpis Schmitz, 1952
- B. germanica (Schmitz, 1918)
- B. incrassata (Meigen, 1830)
- B. inflata Beyer, 1958
- B. insignis Borgmeier & Prado, 1975
- B. irregularis (Wood, 1912)
- B. minor Beyer, 1958
- B. multisetalis Colyer, 1966
- B. okellyi Schmitz, 1937
- B. orientalis Beyer, 1958
- B. pachycostalis (Borgmeier, 1923)
- B. rufibasis Beyer, 1959
- B. simia Beyer, 1965
- B. subagilis Beyer, 1958
- B. subsultans (Linnaeus, 1758, 1767)
- B. thoracalis Beyer, 1958
- B. tibialis Liu & Zeng, 1995
- B. tinctipennis Borgmeier, 1963
- B. verticalis Borgmeier, 1962
