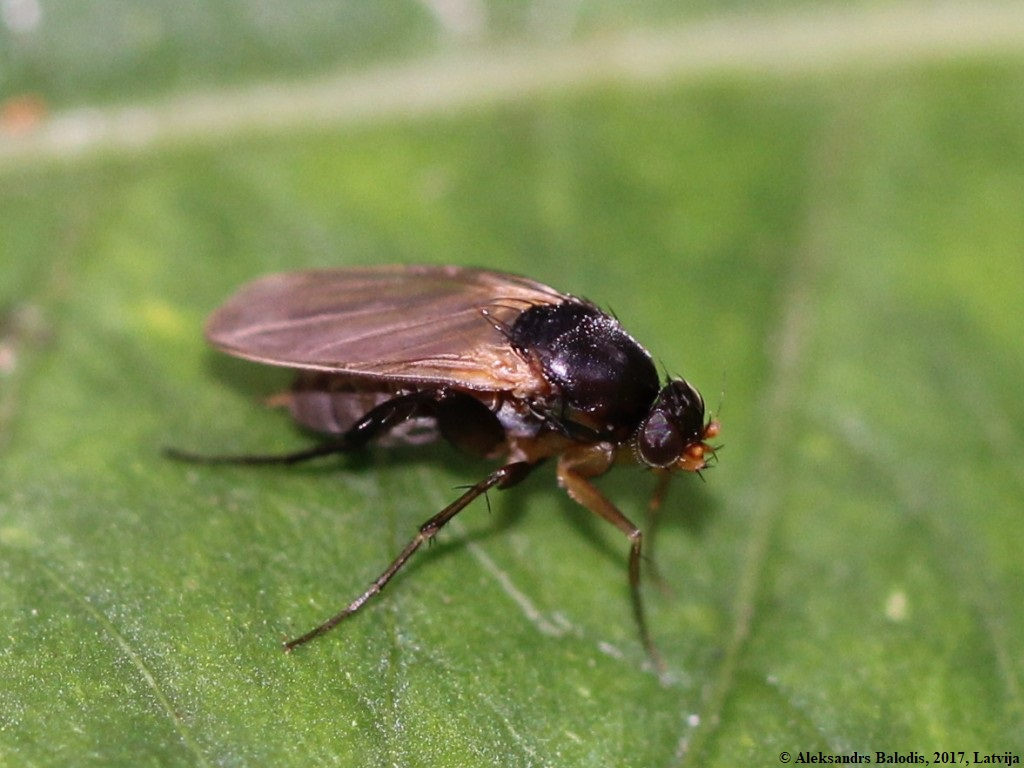

Scientific classification
- Kingdom: Animalia
- Phylum: Arthropoda
- Class: Insecta
- Order: Diptera
- Family: Phoridae
- Genus: Diplonevra
- Species: D. nitidula

Binomial name
- Diplonevra nitidula (Meigen, 1830)

Synonyms
- Phora nitidifrons Brues, 1903; Phora nitidula Meigen, 1830

= Diplonevra nitidula =

Species of fly

Diplonevra nitidula is a species of scuttle flies (insects in the family Phoridae).
