= Phora (fly) =

Scientific classification
- Kingdom: Animalia
- Phylum: Arthropoda
- Class: Insecta
- Order: Diptera
- Family: Phoridae
- Subfamily: Phorinae
- Genus: Phora; Latreille, 1796

Genus of flies

Phora is a genus of scuttle flies (insects in the family Phoridae). There are at least 90 described species in Phora.

== Species ==
These 98 species belong to the genus Phora:

- Phora acerosa Goto, 2006^{c g}
- Phora acuminata Goto, 2006^{c g}
- Phora adducta Schmitz, 1955^{c g}
- Phora advena Mikhailovskaya, 1986^{c g}
- Phora aerea Schmitz, 1930^{i c g}
- Phora algira Macquart, 1843^{c g}
- Phora americana Schmitz and Wirth, 1954^{i c g}
- Phora amplifrons Goto, 1985^{c g}
- Phora anceps (Zetterstedt, 1848)^{c g}
- Phora archepyga Mostovski & Disney, 2001^{c g}
- Phora artifrons Schmitz, 1920^{c g}
- Phora aterrima (Fabricius, 1794)^{c g}
- Phora atra (Meigen, 1804)^{i g}
- Phora bernuthi Egger, 1862^{c g}
- Phora bullata Schmitz, 1927^{c g}
- Phora capillosa Schmitz, 1933^{c g}
- Phora carlina Schmitz, 1930^{i c g}
- Phora carpentieri Gobert, 1877^{c g}
- Phora cilicrus Schmitz, 1920^{c g}
- Phora coangustata Schmitz, 1927^{i c g}
- Phora concava^{g}
- Phora congolensis Beyer, 1965^{c g}
- Phora contractifrons Goto, 1985^{c g}
- Phora convallium Schmitz, 1928^{c g}
- Phora convergens Schmitz, 1920^{c g}
- Phora crinitimargo Goto, 1985^{c g}
- Phora cristipes Schmitz and Wirth, 1954^{i c g}
- Phora digitiformis Goto, 2006^{c g}
- Phora dubia (Zetterstedt, 1848)^{c g}
- Phora edentata Schmitz, 1920^{c g}
- Phora fenestrata Goto, 2006^{c g}
- Phora festinans (Scopoli, 1763)^{c g}
- Phora flexuosa Egger, 1862^{c g}
- Phora fuliginosa (Macquart, 1835)^{c g}
- Phora fulvipennis Goto, 2006^{c g}
- Phora fuscipes (Macquart, 1835)^{c g}
- Phora glebiata Goto, 2006^{c g}
- Phora gorodkovi Mostovski, 2002^{c g}
- Phora greenwoodi Disney, 1989^{c g}
- Phora hamata Schmitz, 1927^{c g}
- Phora hamulata Liu & Chou, 1994^{c g}
- Phora himachalensis Mostovski, 2002^{c g}
- Phora holosericea Schmitz, 1920^{i c g}
- Phora horrida Schmitz, 1920^{c g}
- Phora hyperborea Schmitz, 1927^{c g}
- Phora incisurata Goto, 1985^{c g}
- Phora indivisa Schmitz, 1948^{c g}
- Phora kitadakensis Goto, 1985^{c g}
- Phora lacunifera Goto, 1984^{c g}
- Phora limpida Schmitz, 1935^{c g}
- Phora litoralis Dahl, 1896^{c g}
- Phora livida (Dufour, 1851)^{c g}
- Phora maritima Mikhailovskaya, 1986^{c g}
- Phora michali Disney, 1998^{c g}
- Phora navigans Frauenfeld, 1867^{c g}
- Phora nepalensis Goto, 2006^{c g}
- Phora nigricornis Egger, 1862^{c g}
- Phora nigripennis Waltl, 1837^{c g}
- Phora nipponica Goto, 1986^{c g}
- Phora obscura (Zetterstedt, 1848)^{c g}
- Phora occidentata Malloch, 1912^{i c g}
- Phora orientis Goto, 2006^{c g}
- Phora ozerovi Mostovski, 2002^{c g}
- Phora paramericana Brown, 2000^{c g}
- Phora paricauda Goto, 2006^{c g}
- Phora parvisaltator Goto, 1985^{c g}
- Phora penicillata Schmitz, 1920^{c g}
- Phora pilifemur Borgmeier, 1963^{i c g}
- Phora pilifrons Beyer, 1958^{c g}
- Phora postrema Borgmeier, 1963^{i c g}
- Phora praepadens Schmitz, 1927^{g}
- Phora praepandens Schmitz, 1927^{c g}
- Phora prisca Goto, 1985^{c g}
- Phora pubipes Schmitz, 1920^{c g}
- Phora rapida Meigen, 1838^{c g}
- Phora saigusai Goto, 1986^{c g}
- Phora salpana Goto, 2006^{c g}
- Phora scapularis Macquart, 1835^{c g}
- Phora shirozui Goto, 2006^{c g}
- Phora speighti Disney, 1982^{c g}
- Phora stictica Meigen, 1830^{i c g}
- Phora subconvallium Goto, 2006^{c g}
- Phora sulcaticera (Borgmeier, 1963)^{i g}
- Phora sulcaticerca Borgmeier, 1963^{c g}
- Phora taiwana Goto, 2006^{c g}
- Phora tajicola Mostovski, 2002^{c g}
- Phora tattakana Goto, 2006^{c g}
- Phora tenuiforceps Goto, 2006^{c g}
- Phora theodori Dahl, 1912^{c g}
- Phora tincta Schmitz, 1920^{c g}
- Phora tripliciseta Schmitz and Wirth, 1954^{i c g}
- Phora truncata Brown, 2000^{c g}
- Phora tubericola Frauenfeld, 1866^{c g}
- Phora velutina Meigen, 1830^{c g}
- Phora vicina Macquart, 1835^{c g}
- Phora villosa Macquart, 1843^{c g}
- Phora viridinota Brues, 1916^{i c g}
- Phora zherikhini Mostovski, 2002^{c g}

Data sources: i=ITIS, c=Catalogue of Life, g=GBIF, b=Bugguide.net
