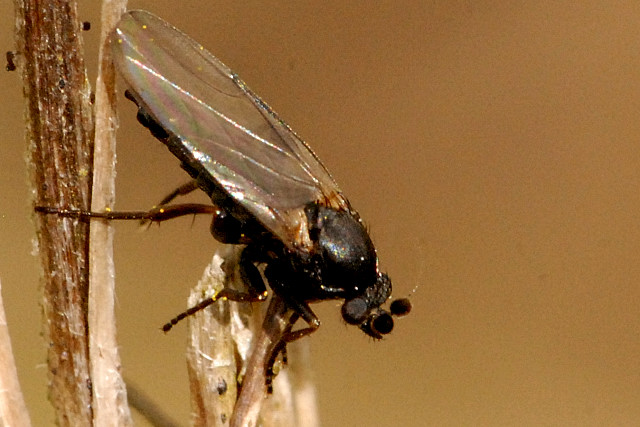
- Anevrina sp

Scientific classification
- Domain: Eukaryota
- Kingdom: Animalia
- Phylum: Arthropoda
- Class: Insecta
- Order: Diptera
- Superfamily: Platypezoidea
- Family: Phoridae
- Subfamily: Phorinae

= Phorinae =

Subfamily of flies

Phorinae is a subfamily of flies in the family Phoridae. There are at least 90 described species in Phorinae.

== Genera ==
- Abaristophora Schmitz, 1927
- Anevrina Lioy, 1864
- Borophaga Enderlein, 1924
- Chaetopleurophora Schmitz, 1922
- Conicera Meigen, 1830
- Coniceromyia Borgmeier, 1923
- Diplonevra Lioy, 1864
- Dohrniphora Dahl, 1898
- Hypocera Lioy, 1864
- Hypocerides Schmitz, 1915
- Phora Latreille, 1796
- Spiniphora Malloch, 1909
- Stichillus Enderlein, 1924
- Triphleba Rondani, 1856
