= Abaristophora =

Scientific classification
- Domain: Eukaryota
- Kingdom: Animalia
- Phylum: Arthropoda
- Class: Insecta
- Order: Diptera
- Family: Phoridae
- Subfamily: Phorinae
- Genus: Abaristophora; Schmitz, 1927

Type species
- Abaristophora arctophila Schmitz, 1927

Synonyms
- Antipodiphora Schmitz, 1939; Antipodophora Evenhuis, 1994

Genus of flies

Abaristophora is a genus of flies in the family Phoridae.

== Species ==
- A. arctophila Schmitz, 1927
- A. austrophila (Schmitz, 1939)
- A. brevicornis (Schmitz, 1939)
- A. diversipennis Borgmeier, 1962
- A. domicamberae Disney & Ross, 1996
- A. nana (Schmitz, 1939)
- A. nepalensis Disney & Ross, 1997
- A. sachalinensis Mikhailovskaya, 1988
- A. similicornis (Schmitz, 1939)
- A. subarcuata (Schmitz, 1939)
- A. tonnoiri (Schmitz, 1939)
