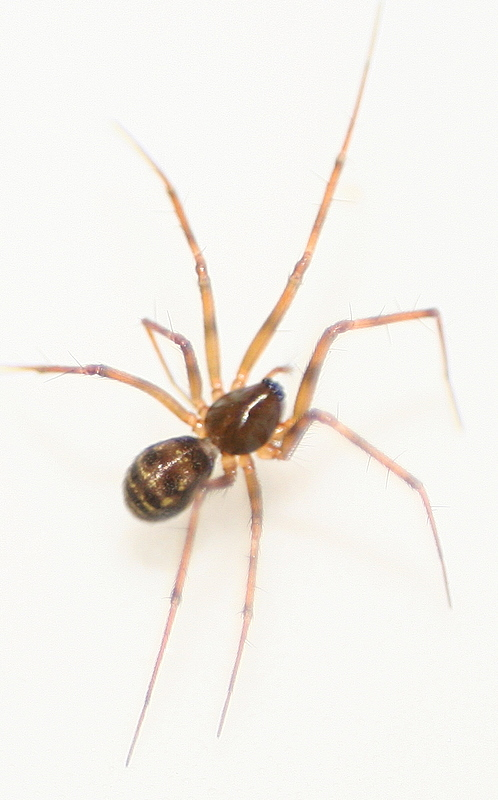

Scientific classification
- Domain: Eukaryota
- Kingdom: Animalia
- Phylum: Arthropoda
- Subphylum: Chelicerata
- Class: Arachnida
- Order: Araneae
- Infraorder: Araneomorphae
- Family: Linyphiidae
- Genus: Lepthyphantes
- Species: L. leprosus

Binomial name
- Lepthyphantes leprosus (Ohlert, 1865)

= Lepthyphantes leprosus =

Species of spider

Lepthyphantes leprosus is a species of sheetweb spider in the family Linyphiidae. It is found in North America, a range from Europe to eastern Russia, and has been introduced into Chile.

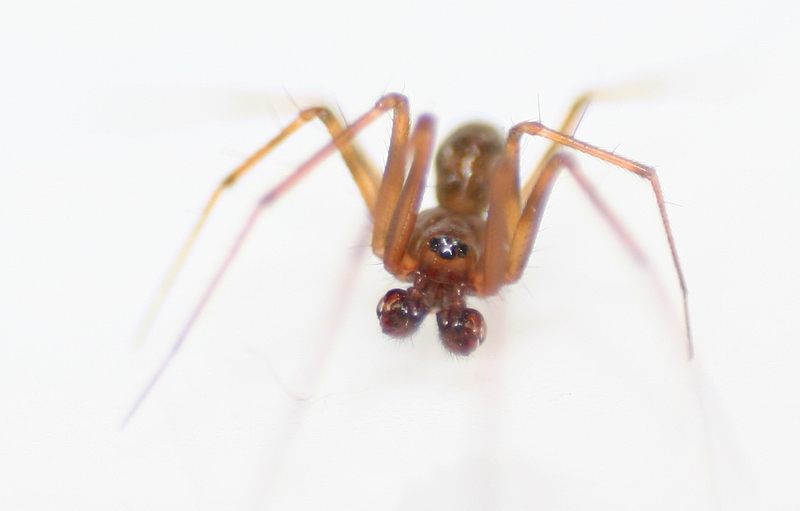

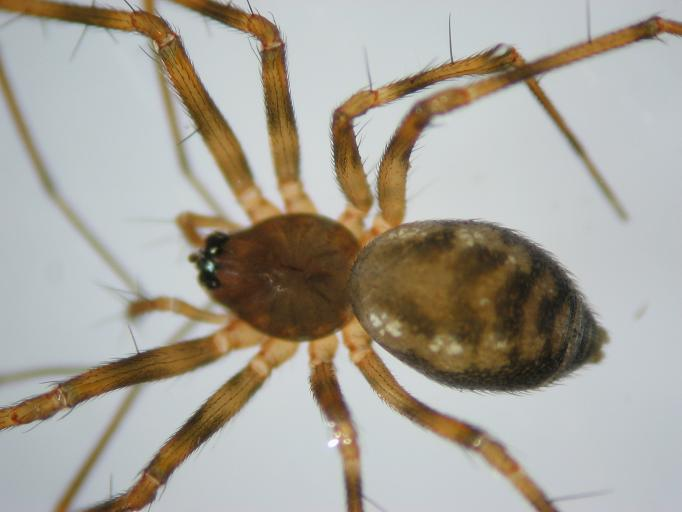
