= Anevrina luggeri =

Scientific classification
- Kingdom: Animalia
- Phylum: Arthropoda
- Clade: Pancrustacea
- Class: Insecta
- Order: Diptera
- Family: Phoridae
- Genus: Anevrina
- Species: A. luggeri

Binomial name
- Anevrina luggeri (Aldrich, 1892)

Synonyms
- Phora luggeri Aldrich, 1892

Species of insect

Anevrina luggeri is a species in the family Phoridae ("scuttle flies"), in the order Diptera ("flies").
