= Lepthyphantes turbatrix =

Scientific classification
- Domain: Eukaryota
- Kingdom: Animalia
- Phylum: Arthropoda
- Subphylum: Chelicerata
- Class: Arachnida
- Order: Araneae
- Infraorder: Araneomorphae
- Family: Linyphiidae
- Genus: Lepthyphantes
- Species: L. turbatrix

Binomial name
- Lepthyphantes turbatrix (O. P.-Cambridge, 1877)

Species of spider

Lepthyphantes turbatrix is a species of sheetweb spider in the family Linyphiidae. It is found in North America and Greenland.
