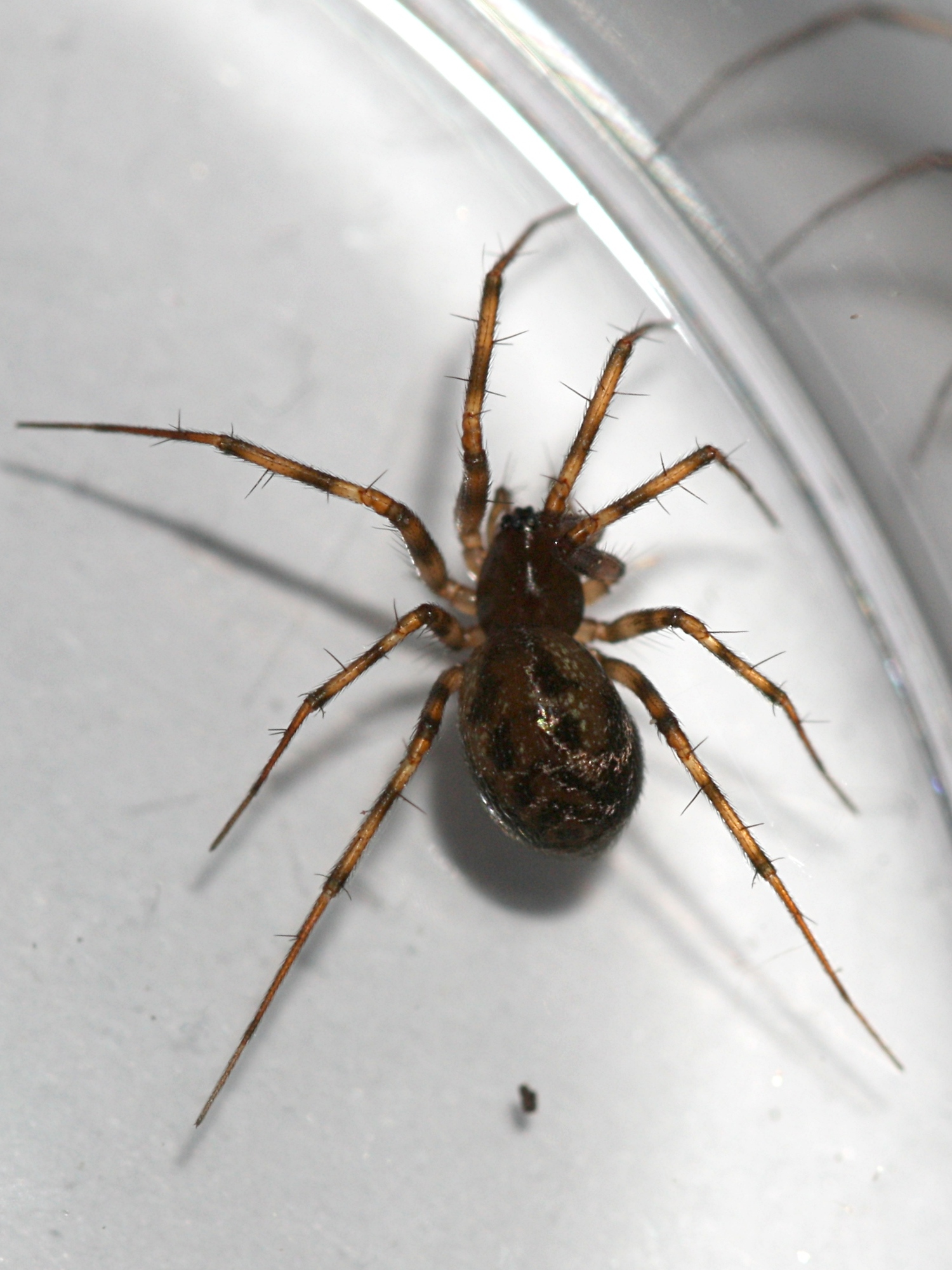

Scientific classification
- Domain: Eukaryota
- Kingdom: Animalia
- Phylum: Arthropoda
- Subphylum: Chelicerata
- Class: Arachnida
- Order: Araneae
- Infraorder: Araneomorphae
- Family: Linyphiidae
- Genus: Lepthyphantes
- Species: L. minutus

Binomial name
- Lepthyphantes minutus Blackwall, 1833

= Lepthyphantes minutus =

Species of spider

Lepthyphantes minutus is a species of spider belonging to the family Linyphiidae. Despite its name it is one of the larger species of Lepthyphantes. It is found throughout Northern Europe.

The body length excluding legs is about 3 to 4 millimetres (0.12 to 0.16 in). The carapace is dark brown. The abdomen typically has black pattern with gold spots, and the legs are annulated, distinguishing it from similar species. The palpal patella of the male has a large spine, which is thicker than those on its legs.

Lepthyphantes minutus is usually found on tree trunks, under logs, or around houses.
