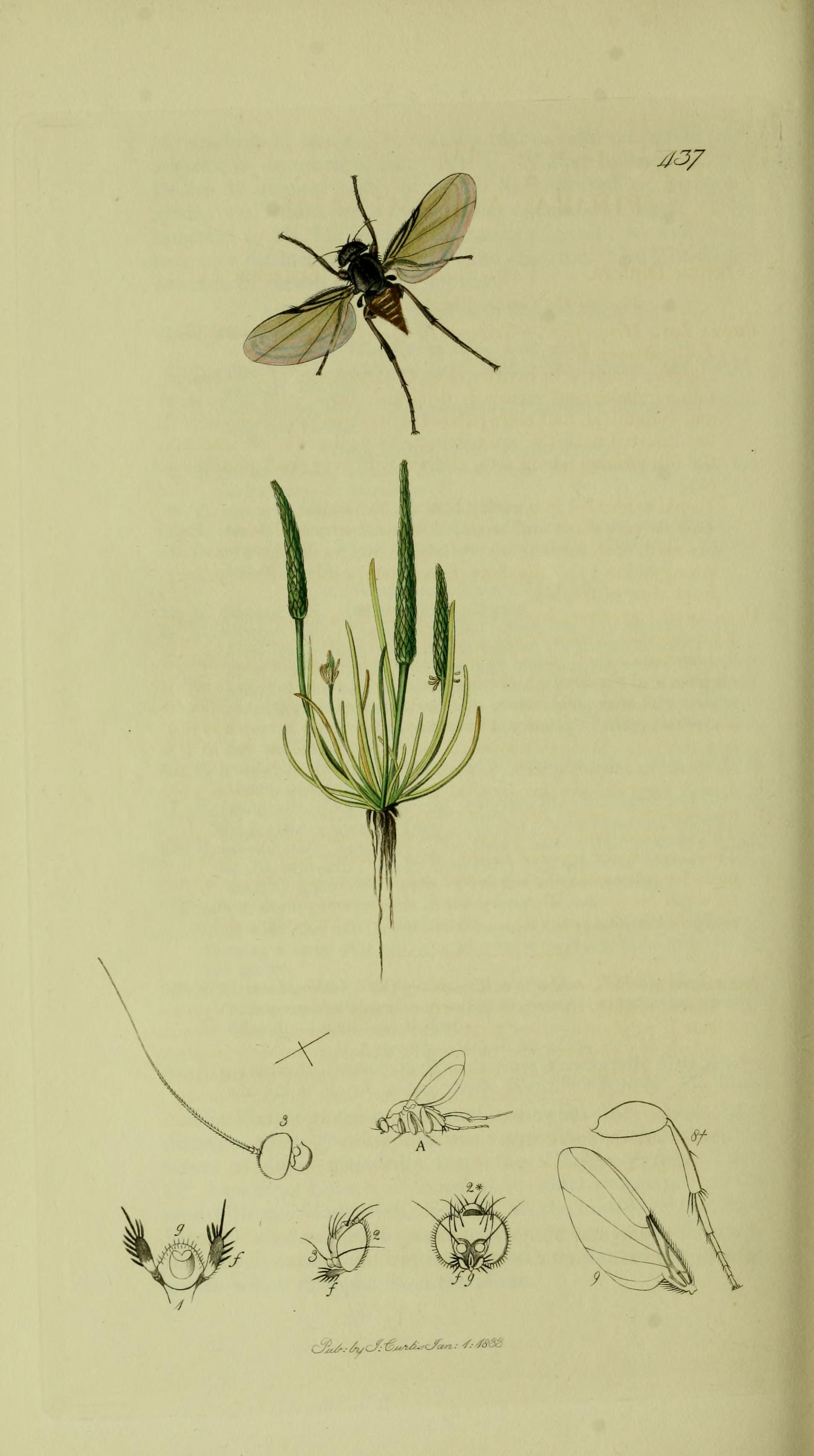
- Drawing of Diplonevra florescens flying above Myosurus minimus (Little Mouse-tail)

Scientific classification
- Domain: Eukaryota
- Kingdom: Animalia
- Phylum: Arthropoda
- Class: Insecta
- Order: Diptera
- Family: Phoridae
- Subfamily: Phorinae
- Genus: Diplonevra; Lioy, 1864

Type species
- Bibio florea Fabricius, 1794

= Diplonevra =

Genus of flies

Diplonevra is a genus of scuttle flies (insects in the family Phoridae). There are at least eight described species in Diplonevra.

== Species ==
- Diplonevra aberrans Borgmeier, 1962
- Diplonevra cornuta
- Diplonevra florea (Fabricius, 1794)
- Diplonevra funebris (Meigen, 1830)
- Diplonevra gaudialis (Cockerell, 1915)
- Diplonevra hamata Borgmeier, 1962
- Diplonevra nigricauda Borgmeier, 1969
- Diplonevra nitidula (Meigen, 1830)
- Diplonevra peregrina Wiedemann, 1830
