= Triphleba =

Scientific classification
- Domain: Eukaryota
- Kingdom: Animalia
- Phylum: Arthropoda
- Class: Insecta
- Order: Diptera
- Family: Phoridae
- Genus: Triphleba; Rondani, 1856

Genus of flies

Triphleba is a genus of flies belonging to the family Phoridae.

The genus has almost cosmopolitan distribution.

Species:

- Triphleba admirabilis Schmitz, 1927
- Triphleba aequalis Schmitz, 1919
