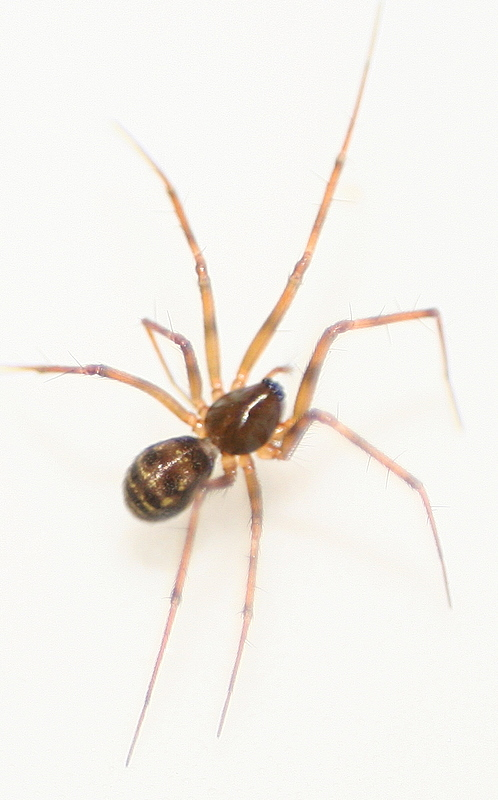
- Lepthyphantes leprosus
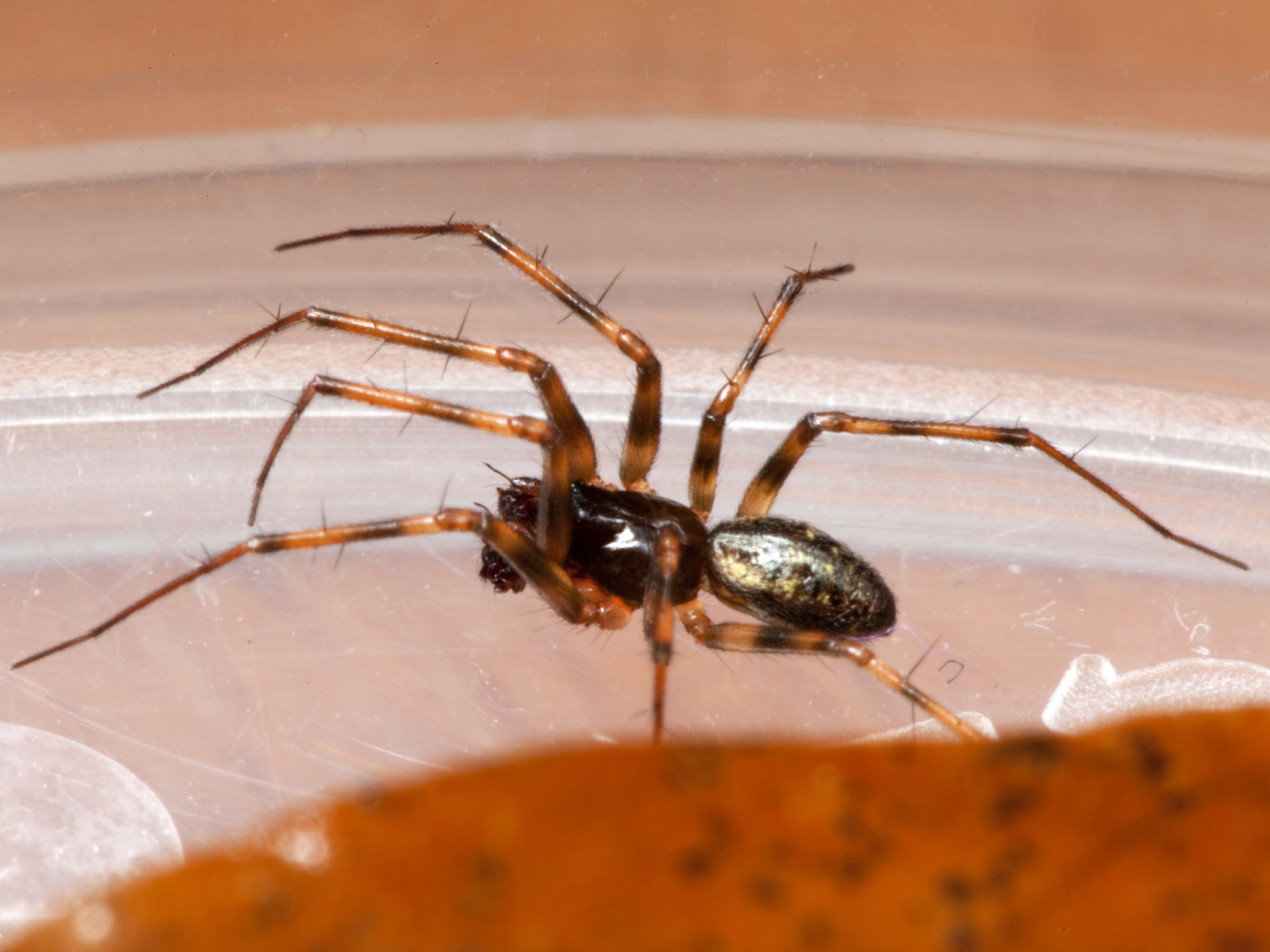
- L. minutus

Scientific classification
- Kingdom: Animalia
- Phylum: Arthropoda
- Subphylum: Chelicerata
- Class: Arachnida
- Order: Araneae
- Infraorder: Araneomorphae
- Family: Linyphiidae
- Subfamily: Linyphiinae
- Genus: Lepthyphantes; Menge, 1866

Type species
- L. minutus (Blackwall, 1833)

Species
- 144, see text

= Lepthyphantes =

Genus of spiders

Lepthyphantes is a genus of dwarf spiders that was first described by Anton Menge in 1866.

Its species are found in Africa, Asia, Europe, and North America.

== Species ==
As of October 2025, this genus includes 144 species and one subspecies.

- Lepthyphantes abditus Tanasevitch, 1986 – Russia (Caucasus)
- Lepthyphantes aberdarensis Russell-Smith & Jocqué, 1986 – Kenya
- Lepthyphantes aegeus Caporiacco, 1948 – Greece
- Lepthyphantes aelleni Denis, 1957 – Morocco
- Lepthyphantes afer (Simon, 1913) – Algeria
- Lepthyphantes ajoti Bosmans, 1991 – Algeria
- Lepthyphantes albuloides (O. Pickard-Cambridge, 1872) – Cyprus, Israel
- Lepthyphantes aldersoni H. W. Levi & L. R. Levi, 1955 – Canada
- Lepthyphantes almoravidus Barrientos, 2020 – Morocco
- Lepthyphantes alpinus (Emerton, 1882) – Russia (Far East), North America
- Lepthyphantes altissimus Hu, 2001 – China
- Lepthyphantes badhkyzensis Tanasevitch, 1986 – Turkmenistan
- Lepthyphantes bakeri Scharff, 1990 – Tanzania
- Lepthyphantes balearicus Denis, 1961 – Spain (Balearic Is.)
- Lepthyphantes bamboutensis Bosmans, 1986 – Cameroon
- Lepthyphantes bamilekei Bosmans, 1986 – Cameroon
- Lepthyphantes baoshanensis Irfan, Zhang & Peng, 2023 – China
- Lepthyphantes beroni Deltshev, 1979 – Greece
- Lepthyphantes beshkovi Deltshev, 1979 – Greece (Crete)
- Lepthyphantes bhudbari Tikader, 1970 – India
- Lepthyphantes bidentatus Hormiga & Ribera, 1990 – Spain
- Lepthyphantes biospeleologorum Barrientos, 2020 – Morocco
- Lepthyphantes brahimi Lecigne & Moutaouakil, 2025 – Morocco
- Lepthyphantes brevihamatus Bosmans, 1985 – Morocco
- Lepthyphantes brignolianus Deltshev, 1979 – Greece (Crete)
- Lepthyphantes buensis Bosmans & Jocqué, 1983 – Cameroon, Kenya
- Lepthyphantes carlittensis Denis, 1952 – France
- Lepthyphantes cavernicola Paik & Yaginuma, 1969 – Korea
- Lepthyphantes centromeroides Kulczyński, 1914 – Balkans, Romania, Ukraine
  - L. c. carpaticus Dumitrescu & Georgescu, 1970 – Romania
- Lepthyphantes chamberlini Schenkel, 1950 – Canada, United States
- Lepthyphantes chita Scharff, 1990 – Tanzania
- Lepthyphantes christodeltshev van Helsdingen, 2009 – Greece
- Lepthyphantes concavus (Oi, 1960) – Japan
- Lepthyphantes cordis Irfan, Zhang & Peng, 2022 – China
- Lepthyphantes cruciformis Tanasevitch, 1989 – Kyrgyzstan
- Lepthyphantes cruentatus Tanasevitch, 1987 – Caucasus (Russia, Georgia)
- Lepthyphantes dilutus (Thorell, 1875) – Sweden
- Lepthyphantes dolichoskeles Scharff, 1990 – Tanzania
- Lepthyphantes ellipticus Irfan, Zhang & Peng, 2025 – China
- Lepthyphantes emarginatus Fage, 1931 – Algeria
- Lepthyphantes encaustus (Becker, 1879) – Romania
- Lepthyphantes ensifer Barrientos, 2020 – Morocco
- Lepthyphantes erigonoides Schenkel, 1936 – China
- Lepthyphantes escapus Tanasevitch, 1989 – Turkmenistan
- Lepthyphantes exvaginatus Deeleman-Reinhold, 1984 – Algeria
- Lepthyphantes fadriquei Barrientos, 2020 – Morocco
- Lepthyphantes fernandezi Berland, 1924 – Chile (Juan Fernandez Is.)
- Lepthyphantes frondeus Irfan, Zhang & Peng, 2025 – China
- Lepthyphantes furcillifer Chamberlin & Ivie, 1933 – Canada, United States
- Lepthyphantes gadesi Fage, 1931 – Spain
- Lepthyphantes hirsutus Tanasevitch, 1988 – Russia (Far East)
- Lepthyphantes hissaricus Tanasevitch, 1989 – Tajikistan
- Lepthyphantes howelli Jocqué & Scharff, 1986 – Tanzania
- Lepthyphantes hublei Bosmans, 1986 – Cameroon
- Lepthyphantes hummeli Schenkel, 1936 – China
- Lepthyphantes hunanensis Yin, 2012 – China
- Lepthyphantes ibericus Ribera, 1981 – Spain
- Lepthyphantes imazigheni Barrientos, 2020 – Morocco
- Lepthyphantes impudicus Kulczyński, 1909 – Madeira
- Lepthyphantes inopinatus Locket, 1968 – DR Congo
- Lepthyphantes intricatus (Emerton, 1911) – Alaska, Canada, United States
- Lepthyphantes iranicus Saaristo & Tanasevitch, 1996 – Iran
- Lepthyphantes japonicus Oi, 1960 – Japan
- Lepthyphantes kansuensis Schenkel, 1936 – China
- Lepthyphantes kilimandjaricus Tullgren, 1910 – Tanzania
- Lepthyphantes kolymensis Tanasevitch & Eskov, 1987 – Russia (north-eastern Siberia, Far East)
- Lepthyphantes kratochvili Fage, 1945 – Greece (Crete)
- Lepthyphantes lamellatus Barrientos, 2020 – Morocco
- Lepthyphantes latrobei Millidge, 1995 – Indonesia (Krakatau)
- Lepthyphantes latus Paik, 1965 – Korea
- Lepthyphantes lebronneci Berland, 1935 – Marquesas Islands
- Lepthyphantes leknizii Barrientos, 2020 – Morocco
- Lepthyphantes leprosus (Ohlert, 1865) – Europe, Turkey, Caucasus, Russia (Europe to Far East), Kazakhstan. Introduced to North America, Chile, Falkland Is. St. Helena
- Lepthyphantes leucocerus Locket, 1968 – Angola
- Lepthyphantes leucopygius Denis, 1939 – France
- Lepthyphantes lingsoka Tikader, 1970 – India
- Lepthyphantes linzhiensis Hu, 2001 – China
- Lepthyphantes locketi van Helsdingen, 1977 – Angola, Kenya
- Lepthyphantes longihamatus Bosmans, 1985 – Morocco
- Lepthyphantes longipedis Tanasevitch, 2014 – Morocco
- Lepthyphantes louettei Jocqué, 1985 – Comoros
- Lepthyphantes lundbladi Schenkel, 1938 – Madeira
- Lepthyphantes luteipes (L. Koch, 1879) – Russia (Urals to Far East), Kazakhstan, Mongolia, China, Japan
- Lepthyphantes maculatus (Banks, 1900) – United States
- Lepthyphantes magnesiae Brignoli, 1979 – Albania, Greece, Turkey
- Lepthyphantes manengoubensis Bosmans, 1986 – Cameroon
- Lepthyphantes mauli Wunderlich, 1992 – Madeira
- Lepthyphantes maurusius Brignoli, 1978 – Morocco
- Lepthyphantes mbaboensis Bosmans, 1986 – Cameroon
- Lepthyphantes meillonae Denis, 1953 – France
- Lepthyphantes messapicus Caporiacco, 1939 – Italy
- Lepthyphantes micromegethes Locket, 1968 – Angola
- Lepthyphantes microserratus Petrunkevitch, 1930 – Puerto Rico
- Lepthyphantes minusculus Locket, 1968 – DR Congo
- Lepthyphantes minutus (Blackwall, 1833) – Europe, Morocco, Algeria (type species)
- Lepthyphantes msuyai Scharff, 1990 – Tanzania
- Lepthyphantes natalis Bosmans, 1986 – Cameroon
- Lepthyphantes nenilini Tanasevitch, 1988 – Russia (Middle Siberia to Far East)
- Lepthyphantes neocaledonicus Berland, 1924 – New Caledonia
- Lepthyphantes nigropictus Bosmans, 1979 – Kenya
- Lepthyphantes nitidior Simon, 1929 – France
- Lepthyphantes nodifer Simon, 1884 – France, Italy, Central Europe, Albania, Romania, Ukraine
- Lepthyphantes noeli Barrientos & Brañas, 2024 – Morocco
- Lepthyphantes noronhensis Rodrigues, Brescovit & Freitas, 2008 – Brazil
- Lepthyphantes notabilis Kulczyński, 1887 – Europe
- Lepthyphantes okuensis Bosmans, 1986 – Cameroon
- Lepthyphantes opilio Simon, 1929 – France
- Lepthyphantes palmeroensis Wunderlich, 1992 – Canary Islands
- Lepthyphantes patulus Locket, 1968 – Angola
- Lepthyphantes pennatus Scharff, 1990 – Tanzania
- Lepthyphantes peramplus (O. Pickard-Cambridge, 1885) – India
- Lepthyphantes perfidus Tanasevitch, 1985 – Central Asia
- Lepthyphantes phallifer Fage, 1931 – Spain
- Lepthyphantes phialoides Scharff, 1990 – Tanzania
- Lepthyphantes pieltaini Machado, 1940 – Morocco
- Lepthyphantes rainieri Emerton, 1926 – Canada
- Lepthyphantes rimicola Lawrence, 1964 – South Africa
- Lepthyphantes rossitsae Dimitrov, 2018 – Turkey
- Lepthyphantes rudrai Tikader, 1970 – India
- Lepthyphantes ruwenzori Jocqué, 1985 – DR Congo, Uganda
- Lepthyphantes sasi Barrientos, 2020 – Morocco
- Lepthyphantes saurensis Eskov, 1995 – Kazakhstan
- Lepthyphantes serratus Oi, 1960 – Japan
- Lepthyphantes silvamontanus Bosmans & Jocqué, 1983 – Cameroon
- Lepthyphantes simiensis Bosmans, 1978 – Ethiopia
- Lepthyphantes soumiae Barrientos, 2021 – Morocco
- Lepthyphantes speculae Denis, 1959 – Lebanon
- Lepthyphantes stramineus (O. Pickard-Cambridge, 1885) – Pakistan
- Lepthyphantes strinatii Hubert, 1970 – Tunisia
- Lepthyphantes styx Wunderlich, 2011 – Canary Islands
- Lepthyphantes subtilis Tanasevitch, 1989 – Kyrgyzstan
- Lepthyphantes tamara Chamberlin & Ivie, 1943 – United States
- Lepthyphantes taza Tanasevitch, 2014 – Morocco
- Lepthyphantes todillus Simon, 1929 – France
- Lepthyphantes turanicus Tanasevitch & Fet, 1986 – Turkmenistan
- Lepthyphantes turbatrix (O. Pickard-Cambridge, 1877) – North America, Greenland
- Lepthyphantes ultimus Tanasevitch, 1989 – Tajikistan
- Lepthyphantes umbratilis (Keyserling, 1886) – United States
- Lepthyphantes vanstallei Bosmans, 1986 – Cameroon
- Lepthyphantes venereus Simon, 1913 – Algeria
- Lepthyphantes vividus Denis, 1955 – Lebanon
- Lepthyphantes younnesi Barrientos & Gerace, 2024 – Morocco
- Lepthyphantes yueluensis Yin, 2012 – China
- Lepthyphantes yushuensis Hu, 2001 – China
